= Horrible Histories: Frightful First World War =

Horrible Histories: Ruthless Romans can refer to:

- A 1998 Horrible Histories book
- A 2008 Horrible Histories exhibition
- A 2009 Horrible Histories stage show
