= Horrible Histories: Ruthless Romans =

Horrible Histories: Ruthless Romans can refer to:

- A 2003 Horrible Histories book
- Horrible Histories: Ruthless Romans (video game), a 2009 video game
- Horrible Histories: Ruthless Romans (stage show), a 2013 stage show
