= Peter Hepplewhite =

British author (born 1954)

Peter Hepplewhite is a British author. He is most well known for the Horrible Histories title The Awesome Egyptians which he co-authored with Terry Deary. However he has written many other children's history books, often co-writing with his long-time writing partner Neil Tonge.

Peter was born in Hartlepool in June 1954 and lived there until his teens. He has lived in North Tyneside, and until recently he worked as the Education Officer at the Tyne & Wear Archives.
