= Horrible Histories: Terrible Trenches =

Horrible Histories: Terrible Trenches is an exhibition created in 2009 as part of the Horrible Histories franchise. It is about "life in the terrible trenches during the First World War", and debuted at the Imperial War Museum. It lasted from 18 July 2009 to 31 October 2010.

== Content ==
The exhibition "sets the writer [Terry Deary]'s work and Martin Brown's illustrations alongside a series of hands-on activities". Interactive content includes allowing participants to try on clothes from the era, smelling odours of the trenches.

== Reception ==
France In London gave it a rating of four and a half stars out of five.
