= Anita Ganeri =

British children's writer (born 1961)

- Born: 1961 (age 64–65); Calcutta, West Bengal, India
- Occupation: Author
- Writing career
- Language: English
- Genre: Non-fiction
- Notable work: Horrible Geography series
- Website: anitaganeri.co.uk

Anita Ganeri (born 1961) is an Indian author of the award-winning series Horrible Geography and many other non-fiction books for children.

== Early life and education ==
Ganeri was born in Calcutta, India and her family emigrated to England when she was a baby. She boarded at Stamford High School, and graduated from the University of Cambridge with a degree in French/German and Indian Studies.

== Career ==
Ganeri worked in publishing for several years - first as a foreign rights manager for Walker, and later as an editor at Usborne - before becoming a freelance writer. Her first published book was a Ladybird book on 'how things work'. In total, she has written over 600 non-fiction books, at a rate of 15-20 per year. Her work on the Horrible Geography series led to her becoming a Fellow of the Royal Geographical Society.

== Personal life ==
Ganeri lives in Ilkley, West Yorkshire, with her husband, the children's author Chris Oxlade.

== Awards ==
Year	Award
1999	Geographical Association Silver Award, for Horrible Geography: Odious Oceans, Violent Volcanoes and Stormy Weather
2007	Practical Pre-School Award, for First Book of Festivals
2008	Geographical Association Highly Commended Award, for Horrible Geography: The Horrible Geography of the World
2009	Blue Peter Book Award - Best Book with Facts, for Horrible Geography Handbooks: Planet In Peril
2010	Joy Tivy Education Medal, presented by the Royal Scottish Geographical Society, for "exemplary, outstanding and inspirational teaching, educational policy or work in formal and informal educational arenas"

== Selected works ==
=== Horrible Geography series ===
- Odious Oceans (1999)
- Stormy Weather (1999)
- Violent Volcanoes (1999)
- Desperate Deserts (2000)
- Earth-Shattering Earthquakes (2000)
- Raging Rivers (2000)
- Bloomin' Rainforests (2001)
- Freaky Peaks (2001)
- Perishing Poles (2002)
- Intrepid Explorers (2003)
- Wild Islands (2004)
- Monster Lakes (2005)
- Cracking Coasts (2006)
- Horrible Geography of the World (2007) - name changed in later editions to Wicked World Tour
- Horrible Geography Handbook: Wicked Weather (2008)
- Horrible Geography Handbook: Wild Animals (2008)
- Horrible Geography Handbook: Planet in Peril (2009)
- Horrible Geography Handbook: Vile Volcanoes (2010)
- Horrible Geography Handbook: Perilous Poles (2010)

== See also ==
- List of children's non-fiction writers
- Horrible Histories
