= List of Horrible Histories books =

This is a list of all the books in the Horrible Histories book series.

== Original books ==
Title	Published	Author	Illustrator
Terrible Tudors	1993	Terry Deary and Neil Tonge	Martin Brown
Awesome Egyptians	1994	Terry Deary and Peter Hepplewhite	Martin Brown
Rotten Romans	1994	Terry Deary	Martin Brown
Vicious Vikings	1994	Terry Deary	Martin Brown
Vile Victorians	1994	Terry Deary	Martin Brown
Blitzed Brits	1994	Terry Deary	Martin Brown
Groovy Greeks	1995	Terry Deary	Martin Brown
Measly Middle Ages	1996	Terry Deary	Martin Brown
Slimy Stuarts	1996	Terry Deary	Martin Brown
Awful Egyptians	1997	Terry Deary	Martin Brown
Cut-Throat Celts	1997	Terry Deary	Martin Brown
Angry Aztecs	1997	Terry Deary	Martin Brown
Terrifying Tudors*	1998	Terry Deary	Martin Brown
Frightful First World War	1998	Terry Deary	Martin Brown
Gorgeous Georgians	1998	Terry Deary	Martin Brown
Savage Stone Age	1999	Terry Deary	Martin Brown
Woeful Second World War	1999	Terry Deary	Martin Brown
Smashing Saxons	2000	Terry Deary	Martin Brown
Incredible Incas	2000	Terry Deary	Martin Brown
Stormin' Normans	2001	Terry Deary	Martin Brown
Barmy British Empire	2002	Terry Deary	Martin Brown
Ruthless Romans	2003	Terry Deary	Martin Brown
Villainous Victorians	2004	Terry Deary	Martin Brown

∗Originally titled Even More Terrible Tudors

The original versions of the books each had a "The" interjected at the start of their titles. This was removed after 2007.

All books include alliteration in their title, except for: Awesome Egyptians, Awful Egyptians, and Stormin' Normans

== Two Horrible Books in One ==
Title 1	Title 2	Published
Angry Aztecs	Incredible Incas	2002
Frightful First World War	Woeful Second World War	2003
Terrible Tudors	Slimy Stuarts	2003
Gorgeous Georgians	Vile Victorians	2005
Barmy British Empire	Blitzed Brits	2007
Awful Egyptians	Ruthless Romans	*2008
Groovy Greeks	Rotten Romans	2009
Smashing Saxons	Stormin' Normans	2009
Vicious Vikings	Measly Middle Ages	2009

∗Originally titled Horribly Huge Book of Awful Egyptians and Ruthless Romans

These book compilations are published with the titles "Title 1 and Title 2".

== Blood Curdling Box Set ==
It includes the books: Savage Stone Age, Awesome Egyptians, Groovy Greeks, Rotten Romans, Cut-Throat Celts, Smashing Saxons, Vicious Vikings, Stormin' Normans, Angry Aztecs, Incredible Incas, Measly Middle Ages, Terrible Tudors, Slimy Stuarts, Gorgeous Georgians, Vile Victorians, Villainous Victorians, Barmy British Empire, Frightful First World War, Woeful Second World War and Blitzed Brits.

== Special editions ==
Title	Published	Author	Illustrator
Cruel Kings and Mean Queens	1995	Terry Deary	Kate Sheppard
Dark Knights and Dingy Castles	1997	Terry Deary	Philip Reeve
Rowdy Revolutions	1996	Terry Deary	Philip Reeve
The Twentieth Century	1996	Terry Deary	Philip Reeve
Wicked Words	1996	Terry Deary	Philip Reeve
*Scotland	1997	Terry Deary	Martin Brown
Ireland	2000	Terry Deary	Martin Brown
**USA	2001	Terry Deary	Martin Brown
France	2002	Terry Deary	Martin Brown
England	2004	Terry Deary	Martin Brown
Rotten Rulers	2005	Terry Deary	Mike Phillips
Wales	2008	Terry Deary	Martin Brown
Cruel Crime	2012	Terry Deary	Mike Phillips

∗Previously Bloody Scotland

∗∗Previously The USA

== Handbooks ==
Title	Published	Author	Illustrator
The Horrible History of the World	2003	Terry Deary	Martin Brown
Perilous Pirates	2006	Terry Deary	Martin Brown
Wicked Witches	2007	Terry Deary	Mike Phillips
Vile Villains	2008	Terry Deary	Martin Brown
Spies	2009	Terry Deary	Martin Brown
Blitz	2009	Terry Deary	Mike Phillips
Wild Warriors	2010	Terry Deary	Mike Phillips
Nasty Knights	2010	Terry Deary	Martin Brown
Terrible Trenches	2011	Terry Deary	Martin Brown

== Horrible Histories Gruesome Guides ==
Previously Horrible Histories Cities

Some Horrible Histories have been based around a particular city, rather than a nation or a specific time period. They also have a map when the front cover is folded out, and explain some structures in the city when the back cover is folded out. Therefore, many people consider them to be a sub-series as well. (Even though Loathsome London doesn't have these qualities, it was included into this sub-series during the republishing of the series from 2008 to 2011.

Title	Published	Author	Illustrator
York	2005	Terry Deary	Mike Phillips
Oxford	2010	Terry Deary	Martin Brown
Stratford-upon-Avon	2010	Terry Deary	Mike Phillips
Edinburgh	2010	Terry Deary	Mike Phillips
*London	2016	Terry Deary	Martin Brown
Dublin	2017	Terry Deary	Mike Phillips
Liverpool	2024	Terry Deary	Mike Phillips

∗Previously Loathsome London

== High Speed History ==
High Speed History is a Horrible Histories sub-series beginning in 2010 that features historical tales in a comic-strip format.

Title	Published	Author	Illustrator
High Speed History: Egyptians	2010	Terry Deary	Dave Smith
High Speed History: Tudors	2010	Terry Deary	Dave Smith
High Speed History: Knights	2011	Terry Deary	Dave Smith
High Speed History: Rome	2011	Terry Deary	Dave Smith

== Annuals ==
Title	Published
Awesome Annual 2007	2007
Annual 2008	2008
Annual 2009	2009
Annual 2010	2010
Annual 2011	2011
Annual 2012	2012
Annual 2013	2013
Annual 2014	2014
Annual 2015	2015
Annual 2016	2016

== Novelty books and others ==
Title	Published	Author	Illustrator
Dreadful Diary	1996	Terry Deary	Martin Brown
Poisonous Postcards	1997	Terry Deary	Martin Brown
The Massive Millennium Quiz Book	1999	Terry Deary	Martin Brown
The Mad Millennium: A Play	1999	Terry Deary	Martin Brown
Horrible Christmas	2000	Terry Deary	Martin Brown
The Awesome Ancient Quiz Book	2001	Terry Deary	Martin Brown
Cruel Crime and Painful Punishment	2002	Terry Deary	Mike Phillips
The Wicked History of the World	2003	Terry Deary	Martin Brown
The Mad Miscellany	2004	Terry Deary and Martin Brown	Martin Brown
Terrible Tomb of Tutankhamun Pop-up Adventure	2008	Terry Deary	Martin Brown
Horribly Huge Book of Terrible Tudors	2009	Terry Deary and Neil Tonge	Martin Brown
Horribly Huge Press-Out-and-Build Book	2009	Terry Deary	Martin Brown
Horribly Hilarious Joke Book	2009	Terry Deary	Martin Brown
Who's Horrible in History	2009	Terry Deary	Martin Brown
The Horrible History of Britain and Ireland	2010	Terry Deary	Martin Brown
Frightfully Funny Quiz Book	2010	Terry Deary	Martin Brown
Deadly Days in History	2013	Terry Deary	Martin Brown
The Beastly Best Bits	2013	Terry Deary	Martin Brown
The Big Fat Christmas Book	2014	Terry Deary	Martin Brown
Top 50 Kings & Queens	2015	Terry Deary	Martin Brown
Top 50 Villains	2016	Terry Deary	Martin Brown
This is a Horrible Book of Foul Facts	2016	Terry Deary	Martin Brown
Crackin' Castles	2016	Terry Deary	Martin Brown
Groovy Greeks Presents 'Orrible Olympics	2016	Terry Deary	Martin Brown
Gruesome Great Houses	2017	Terry Deary	Martin Brown
Horrible Histories of Great Britain	2017	Terry Deary	Martin Brown
Horrible Histories 25th Anniversary Yearbook	2017	Terry Deary	Martin Brown
Up in the Air	2021	Terry Deary	Martin Brown
On Track	2021	Terry Deary	Martin Brown
Horrible Histories All at Sea	2022	Terry Deary	Martin Brown
Ghosts	2022	Terry Deary	Martin Brown
The Worst in the World	2023	Terry Deary	Martin Brown
On The Road	2023	Terry Deary	Martin Brown
Paws, Claws and Jaws	2023	Terry Deary	Martin Brown
Terrible Thames	2024	Terry Deary	Martin Brown
Terrible Toilets	2025	Terry Deary	Martin Brown
Terrible Traitors	2025	Terry Deary	Martin Brown
