= Horrible Geography =

Children's book series by Anita Ganeri

- Cover of Freaky Peaks
- Author: Anita Ganeri
- Illustrator: Mike Phillips
- Cover artist: Phillips
- Subject: Geography
- Genre: Non-fiction
- Publisher: Scholastic
- Publication date: 1999–present
- Publication place: United Kingdom

Horrible Geography is a series of children's non-fiction books written by Anita Ganeri, illustrated by Mike Phillips, and published in the UK by Scholastic. It is a spin-off from the Horrible Histories series, and is designed to get children interested in geography.

== Reception ==
The Royal Meteorological Society's Metlink teaching resource reviewed Stormy Weather, calling it "engaging, accurate and interesting", and praising its conversational style and illustrations. A review in the journal Nature praised the series (along with Horrible Science) for its "sense of fun" alongside the educational content, but noted that the facts provided are occasionally misleading. Books for Keeps gave a generally positive review of Odious Oceans and Violent Volcanoes, commenting that "Ganeri’s geographical ventures represent a definite step forward for this respected writer".

== Awards and sales ==
As of August 2011, the series has sold almost 2 million copies and been translated into more than 20 languages.

Horrible Geography: Odious Oceans, Violent Volcanoes and Stormy Weather won the Geographical Association Silver Award in 1999. In 2008, the Geographical Association also gave Horrible Geography of the World a Highly Commended Award for its contribution to school geography. The Horrible Geography Handbook: Planet in Peril won the 2009 Blue Peter Book Award for Best Book with Facts.

In 2010, Anita Ganeri was presented with the Royal Scottish Geographical Society's Joy Tivy Education Medal for "exemplary, outstanding and inspirational teaching, educational policy or work in formal and informal educational arenas".

== Titles in the series ==
=== Main series and specials ===
- Odious Oceans (1999)
- Stormy Weather (1999)
- Violent Volcanoes (1999)
- Desperate Deserts (2000)
- Earth-Shattering Earthquakes (2000)
- Raging Rivers (2000)
- Bloomin' Rainforests (2001)
- Freaky Peaks (2001)
- Perishing Poles (2002)
- Intrepid Explorers (2003)
- Wild Islands (2004)
- Monster Lakes (2005)
- Cracking Coasts (2006)
- Horrible Geography of the World (2007) - name changed in later editions to Wicked World Tour

=== Handbooks ===
- Wicked Weather (2008)
- Wild Animals (2008)
- Planet in Peril (2009)
- Vile Volcanoes (2010)
- Perilous Poles (2010)

=== Local editions ===
- Incontenibile Italia (2007)
