= Flight of the Fire Thief =

Novel by Terry Deary

- Author: Terry Deary
- Cover artist: David Wyatt
- Language: English
- Series: The Fire Thief Trilogy
- Genre: Fantasy novel
- Publisher: Kingfisher Books
- Publication date: 2006
- Publication place: United Kingdom
- Media type: Print (hardcover & paperback)
- Pages: 236 pp
- ISBN: 978-0-7534-5819-8
- OCLC: 74448980
- LC Class: MLCS 2006/45860
- Preceded by: The Fire Thief
- Followed by: The Fire Thief Fights Back

Flight of the Fire Thief is a novel written by British writer Terry Deary, and is the second installment of The Fire Thief Trilogy. The book continues the story of Prometheus, the Titan who stole fire from the gods.

Other books in the series: The Fire Thief (2005) and The Fire Thief Fight Back (2007)

== Plot ==
It follows on directly from The Fire Thief. Prometheus goes back to 1795 to try to find a hero who is worshipped in a temple in the first book, only to find out he did not travel back far enough. He returns to Eden City to find it under siege against Wild People, just like Troy. He helps a Dr. Dee and his daughter, Nell, to end the siege and help the Wild People get their princess back. However, the Avenger is still looking for him, and has a team of Achilles and Paris, also from Troy, and a monster from the underworld, a 50-headed, 100 armed Hecatonchires. To get past the walls, Hera attempted to repeat the Trojan Horse method, but that failed. Nell eventually sneaked in and launched the spring cannon. The Avenger's team eventually turns on him, allowing Prometheus to escape once again.

== Characters ==
Prometheus: Also called Theus, stole fire from the gods and was chained to a rock and had his liver eaten every day for 200 years. Heracles saved him, only to be given the task of finding a human hero. Flight of the Fire Thief is a novel written by Terry Deary, and is the second installment of The Fire Thief Trilogy. The book continues the story of Prometheus, the Titan who stole fire from the gods.

Helen: Also called Nell. She helps her father scam with stunts and a flying balloon. They land in Eden City after a failed stunt. After a failed attempt to rob the city, she decides to help the Wild People get their princess out of the city. She returns to Eden City in the year 1857 to wait for Theus.

Dr. Dee: A showman and conman. He and his daughter sell cheap food and show stunts to con people out of their money. He comes up with a plan to rob the people of the city, but lands in the plains of the Wild People instead.

Running Bear: Young chief of the Wild People. After refusing to give up his people's land, his sister is kidnapped. He then sets up a siege to get her back.

Mayor Makepiece: Mayor of Eden City. He tried to drive the Wild People off their land to sell it for a ridiculous amount of money.

Sheriff Spade: Sheriff of Eden City and Mayor Makepiece's partner.

Zeus: Prometheus's cousin. He punished Prometheus by chaining him to a rock to have his liver eaten every day. He then gave him a task to find a human hero so to call of The Avenger.

Hera: Zeus's wife. She gets bored watching the siege of Troy, and orders Zeus to end it quickly. She then tries to end the siege of Eden City, but her plans are quickly thwarted.

Achilles: A Greek hero of the Trojan War. He was killed by Paris and they both are taken to the underworld by the Avenger, only to strike a deal with him to help him find Theus.

Paris: Trojan Prince. He is killed by a poison arrow soon after he killed Achilles. He helps the Avenger to hunt down Theus.

Hecatonchires: Called Hec for short. Helps The Avenger find Theus, but then helps Theus and his friends get into Eden City and get the princess out. He eventually finds a planet with more creatures that look exactly like him.
