= America's Funny But True History =

Children's book series

America's Funny But True History (formally America's Horrible Histories) is one of the many spin-offs of Horrible Histories. The series is written by Elizabeth Levy and explores the history of North America, focusing on the United States in the latter books.

The books appear in school and library reading and study lists.

Who Are You Calling a Woolly Mammoth? : Prehistoric America.

== Titles ==
The series consists of the following works:

1. Who Are You Calling a Woolly Mammoth? : Prehistoric America (2001) - (Prehistoric America)
2. Awesome Ancient Ancestors! : Mound Builders, Maya, and More (2001) - (Aztecs, Incas, Mayans...)
3. Are We There Yet? : Europeans Meet the Americans (2002) - (European Colonization of the Americas)
4. Cranky Colonials: 1560s - 1740s (2003) - (American Colonies)
5. Revolting Revolutionaries : 1750s - 1790s (2003) - (American Revolutions)
6. Westward, Ha-Ha! : 1800-1850 (2003) - (The American West)

== Controversy of title ==
According to an extract from Elizabeth Levy, "America's Horrible Histories" is now formally known as "America's Funny But True History" (hence the old series is obsolete), bringing some controversy over which books are officially part of which series and which books have which logos on top of them. She decided this after she wrote "Are We There Yet", most probably for copyright reasons related to the Horrible Histories series. Her next book, Cranky Colonials was the first book to have the new title.

== Critical reception ==
Spirit of Jefferson Farmer's Advocate called Awesome Ancient Ancestors "tongue in cheek". while Publishers Weekly described Who Are You Calling a Woolly Mammoth? and Awesome Ancient Ancestors! as "a punchy perspective on the past"

== See also ==
- Elizabeth Levy
- Horrible Histories
- History of America (disambiguation)
