= Arthur Silva =

Arthur Silva may refer to:

- Arthur Silva White (1859-1932), British geographer and travel author
- Arthur Marcelles de Silva (1879-1957), Ceylonese surgeon
- Artur da Costa e Silva (1899-1969), Brazilian army marshall and former President of Brazil
- Arthur Silva (footballer, born 1990), Brazilian football centre-back
- Arthur Silva (footballer, born 1995), Brazilian football defensive midfielder
- Arthur D. Silva Water Tank, water tank in Shoshone, Idaho

== See also ==
- Arthur Silver
