= Ganeri =

Ganeri is a surname. Notable people with the surname include:

- Anita Ganeri (born 1961), Indian author
- Jonardon Ganeri, philosopher
