= Tivy =

Tivy may refer to:

- Tivy High School, a public high school located in Kerrville, Texas, United States
- Joy Tivy, a 20th-century Irish physical geographer at the University of Glasgow
- River Tivy, a river in Wales
