= Horrible Histories: Live on Stage =

Series of stage shows

Horrible Histories: Live on Stage is the name for a series of stage shows within the Horrible Histories franchise. They are produced by The Birmingham Stage Company.

== Horrible Histories: Vile Victorians ==
Horrible Histories: Vile Victorians is a 2005 stage show, which is part of the "Live on Stage" series in the Horrible Histories franchise. The show was created by the Birmingham Stage Company. It was released along with Horrible Histories: Terrible Tudors. Both shows run at two hours which includes a 15-minute intermission. Terrible Tudors and Vile Victorians in bogglevision visited theatres around Britain in 2010 in a production by the Birmingham Stage Company. These plays were written by Terry Deary and were a hit during their 2006 tour. The show premiered at the Civic Theatre, Darlington on September 20, 2005.

It is based on the Horrible Histories book Vile Victorians, written by Terry Deary.

=== Synopsis ===
The play explores themes such as Victorian inventions, mines, factories, and the Charge of the Light Brigade.

=== Reception ===
The Birmingham Mail gave the Belgrade Theatre production four stars out of five, commenting, "Birmingham Stage Company has cleverly adapted [Vile Victorians] for live stage. Chapters are turned into short scenes with an atmospheric movie backdrop, which in the second half becomes 3D. Four wonderfully energetic actors do an excellent job of informing and interacting." The Sunderland Echo said "In truth, the plot was incidental to the stories being told, which amused and repulsed in equal measure", and noted "to keep the interest going, there was plenty of audience participation, nods to popular culture and a second half which featured a Boggle-Vision 3D animation as a stage backdrop."

== Horrible Histories: Terrible Tudors ==
Horrible Histories: Terrible Tudors is a 2005 stage show which is part of the Horrible Histories franchise. It is one of the "Live on Stage" theatre shows produced by the Birmingham Stage Company. It was released alongside Horrible Histories: Vile Victorians. The running time for both shows is about two hours including a 15-minute intermission. Terrible Tudors and Vile Victorians in bogglevision played at theatres around Britain in 2010 in a production by the Birmingham Stage Company. The show premiered at the Civic Theatre, Darlington on 20 September 2005.

The stage show is directed by Phil Clark, and written by Terry Deary. It was designed by Jacqueline Trousdale, the music composed by Matthew Scott, and the 3D Bogglevision special effects are by Amazing Interactives. The Regent Theatre cast included: Pip Chamberlin, Lynette Clarke, Laura Crowhurst, and Simon Lloyd.

=== Reception ===
The British Theatre Guide wrote, "Terrible Tudors is yet another historical hit from the Birmingham Stage Company. Not only do they demonstrate that history can be fun, but that Theatre in Education is so much more than morals and messages. History, by its very nature, is theatrical and with a never ending stream of possible topics, long may Horrible Histories continue to enlighten and frighten its audience." The Stage said "The central performances are suitably indelicate and very funny ... Young children should prepare for a scare; these effects knock your socks off just when you were thinking it was all jaw and no gore."

Carole Green of the BBC reviewed the Terrible Tudors play at the Grand Opera House, York (2006). She wrote, "It was a wonderful evening, very funny and educational without realising it."

== Horrible Histories: Awful Egyptians ==
Awful Egyptians is a 2007 stage show, which is part of the "Live on Stage" series in the Horrible Histories franchise. The show was created by the Birmingham Stage Company, and premiered at the Civic Theatre, Darlington on 6 February 2007. It made its Australian debut at the Sydney Opera House. It is written by Terry Deary, and adapted by Ciaran McConville and John-Paul Cherrington. It is 115 minutes long.

=== Reception ===
The show was given a rating of three stars out of five by The Sydney Morning Herald which said that unlike the TV series, "the stage show comes across like an old-school pantomime, full of groaning puns, crude slapstick, threadbare jokes and rubber props", adding that children loved it.

== Horrible Histories: Ruthless Romans ==
Horrible Histories: Ruthless Romans is a 2007 stage show, which is part of the "Live on Stage" series in the Horrible Histories franchise. The show was created by the Birmingham Stage Company. It was first produced at the Civic Theatre, Darlington on 6 February 2007, and later staged at The Old Rep from 8 October 2013.

=== History ===
The show was performed at the Dubai Community Theatre & Art Centre in October 2013. Founder Rania Kuzbari Ashur said: "I have been working with the Birmingham Stage Company since 2004. This is the fourth time we have brought a Horrible Histories play to the UAE, We brought Barmy Britain last year, which was a great success. Our first one was Victorian Traders in 2005."

=== Synopsis ===
Themes of the play include Roman emperors, gladiators, the Roman army, Roman Britain, and Spartacus.

=== Reception ===
The show was nominated for The Manchester Evening News Award for Best Special Entertainment. The Cambridge News said, "Horrid, silly, yet clever and concise, The Ruthless Romans is like the best history lesson you can ever imagine".

== Horrible Histories: Nottingham ==
Part of the Horrible Histories franchise the show premiered at Nottingham's Theatre Royal on 12 June 2008. It was put on by the Birmingham Stage Company, and was "specifically about the history of Nottingham." The director was Phil Clark, the producer was Neal Foster, and Rachel Watkinson played the role of Ella.

=== Production ===
LeftLion explains that the "play has a cast of two and the set consists solely of a wagon and some props."

Neal Foster of the Birmingham Stage Company said: "Terry Deary has drawn together all the different stories and the famous legend of the city into a delicious hour of history with the nasty bits left in! I think that is what is so special and new about it".

Extracts from Horrible Histories Nottingham were read on the Upper Circle foyer of the Theatre Royal, during the Robin of Sherwood event on 26 July 2008.

=== Synopsis ===
The play is about the history of Nottingham, including figures such as Robin Hood. It "provide[s] a foul but fascinating tour of the city's savage sites, from the rotten Romans to the vile Victorians".

=== Reception ===
LeftLion wrote: "There are three things I can't stand when I watch a play. Overly bubbly actors, prop gags and horror of horrors, audience participation. Which is why I don't really understand why I enjoyed this play despite the fact that it contained all three." The site added: "Truly great children's plays entertain the parents just as much as the kids. This one missed the mark slightly ... If the jokes in the script were rubbish, the actual history more than made up for it."

== Horrible Histories: Blitzed Brits ==
Blitzed Brits (a.k.a. Woeful Second World War) is a 2009 stage show, which is part of the "Live on Stage" series in the Horrible Histories franchise. The show was created by the Birmingham Stage Company, and was released alongside Frightful First World War as Horrible Histories World Wars. The show was written by Terry Deary, adapted by Phil Clarke, and directed by Phil Clark. Its original cast included: Perry Lambert, Matthew Schmolle, Ciaran McConville, and Laura Dalgleish. The design and screen illustrations are by Phil Clark and Jaqueline Trousdale, while the 3D special effects are by Amazing Interactives. Its running time was 1hr 50mins.

=== History ===
In 2009 Deary wrote two new plays for the Birmingham Stage Company to tour Blitzed Brits and Frightful First World War.

=== Production ===
The Press explains: "Horrible Histories: Woeful Second World War ... is based on one of Terry's Gory Stories novels, Blackout In The Blitz, wherein he combines the German blitz of Coventry with the exploitation and bullying of evacuee children in Wales and the running of a meat black market."

=== Synopsis ===
The Spark Children's Art Festival describes the plot thus: "From the brutal Blitz to the soggy shelters, join young Alf and Sally as they are evacuated to darkest Wales, where they deal with rotten rations, scary schools and new parents! But the bombers are on their way so be sure to take cover!".

=== Reception ===
The Stage said "There's lots of songs of the period to jolly the pace along ... There are excellent performances too ... This exciting story is told against a series of cleverly changing backgrounds". The Essex Chronicle notes, "The Woeful Second World War didn't work so well. Hitler and the Holocaust are hardly ideal subject matter for primary schools and with this in mind, they play it safe".

== Horrible Histories: Frightful First World War ==
Horrible Histories: Frightful First World War is a 2009 stage show, which is part of the "Live on Stage" series in the Horrible Histories franchise. The show was created by the Birmingham Stage Company, and was released alongside Woeful Second World War - Blitzed Brits as Horrible Histories World Wars with another Deary book, entitled The Woeful Second World War illustrated by Martin Brown. It is written by Deary and directed by Phil Clark. The Bogglevision was designed by Jacqueline Trousdale and Amazing Interactive. Tom Lishman did the sound effects and Jason Taylor did the lighting. The running time is approximately 110 minutes. Its original cast consisted of Perry Lambert, Matthew Schmolle, Ciaran McConville, and Laura Dalgleish.

=== History ===
In 2009 Deary wrote two new plays for the Birmingham Stage Company to tour The Blitzed Brits and The Frightful First World War.

=== Synopsis ===
The show's premise involves "[a] 13 year old Angelica Taylor who is sucked into the Horrible Histories website", who then proceeds to learn about the First World War.

=== Reception ===
The Stage said, "Punctuated with humour and audience participation, the important message remains clear and is punched home in the midst of battle. Yet another superb example of history brought vividly to life." The Public Reviews said, "Terry Deary's script is laden with witty one-liners and jokes galore. There is also great audience participation." It added that the Bogglevision "really immerses you into the action and is truly outstanding", and that the show had a "highly talented cast and a production that packs so much information and energy into a delightful two hours". The Essex Chronicle said, "There is a deep poignancy to the ending of this instalment, with its cascade of poppies showering gently over us, and hopefully its message will resonate with young audiences for years to come." The Times said "Horrible, yes, but thankfully not trivialized history."

== Horrible Histories: Barmy Britain ==
Barmy Britain is a family stage show which is part of the Horrible Histories franchise. It is co-written by Terry Deary, Neal Foster & Ciaran McConville, directed by Neal Foster, and produced by The Birmingham Stage Company. The theatre production is staged in three separate shows, Part 1 and Part 2, and a Part 3 (released in 2015 due to the success of the first two shows).

=== Development ===
Part 1 was written in 2011 following a performance at The Lolibop Festival in Regent's Park. After receiving high praise at Regent's Park the production was developed and opened at the Garrick Theatre London on February 14, 2012. Part 2 followed opening on September 29 at the Garrick Theatre due to its predecessor's popularity. Part 2 has a running time of 105 minutes.

Director Neal Foster, said: "There's so much British history to get through. We start with the Celts and end up in the Victorian period. ... Children love all the gory, naughty, the silly, the rude and disgusting and we make sure it's full of all that. ... We bring history to life so it all helps you to understand and put yourself in their position because suddenly it's very real and it's there in front of you."

=== Content ===
The show is set in London, and "features a finale whose sarcastic references to burger bars, bankers and internet dating leave its young audience in little doubt that whatever the crazed excesses of our ancestors, future generations will doubtless consider us every bit as loopy". The Guardian says it "ends on a serious note as it points out that it's unlikely that those who come after us will think we are any less barmy than we do those who came before". The London Evening Standard notes "there are clever spoofs of popular television programmes".

Part 2 includes historical characters such as: "Boudicca, Elizabeth I, Burke and Hare, and Queen Victoria".

=== Reception ===
Horrible Histories Barmy Britain Part One

The Daily Express said, "Horrible Histories brings the bloody story of Britain throbbingly alive in this hilarious show from the excellent Birmingham Stage Company. Bloody, marvellous stuff!"

The Daily Times noted, "Is this any way for children to learn about history? Too right it is! If lessons were always like this, kids would be queuing up at the school gates every morning. Be Thrilled!"

Whilst Time Out said, "Heartily enjoyable and loudly appreciated. Britain seems not so much 'barmy' as barbarous, bloodthirsty and stark raving bonkers."

Horrible Histories Barmy Britain Part Two was met with similar praise from the press.

The Daily Express returned to say, "Hilariously vulgar, brilliantly grisly - it has the young audience in stitches!"

Time Out continued with, "A genuinely sly alternative to classroom orthodoxy, staged with wit, love and wry post-modern humour - I sure as heck enjoyed it!"

"A full throttle, side-splitting ride through two thousand years of British history!" wrote The American Magazine.

=== Cast members ===
Barmy Britain One: Lauryn Redding (Original), Benedict Martin (Original), Neal Foster, Alison Fitzjohn, Gary Wilson, Simon Davies, Laura Crowhurst, Anthony Spargo.

Barmy Britain Two: Lauryn Redding (Original), Anthony Spargo (Original), Timothy Speyer, Neal Foster, Alison Fitzjohn

Both productions of Horrible Histories Barmy Britain were directed by The Birmingham Stage Company Actor/Manager Neal Foster.

Poster to the show.

== Horrible Histories: Horrible Christmas ==
Horrible Histories: Horrible Christmas is a 2013 stage show which is part of the Horrible Histories franchise. It is one of the "Live on Stage" theatre shows produced by the Birmingham Stage Company. It premiered at Derby Theatre.

=== Development ===
The show was based on earlier play Crackers Christmas but was rewritten by Terry Deary for its Derby premiere. Crackers Christmas, based on Terry's Horrible Christmas book ran at the Sherman in December 2000. In 2002 Deary revived the play in a version for Barrow-in-Furness. He starred in that production.

=== Reception ===
The Burton Mail said: "Fans of the series might suggest that this isn't as 'Horrible' as we might expect - the grisly details of historical times are perhaps kept in check by the needs of a Christmas show - and the story that links the period sketches is a little tedious, if you are aged over eight. But there are some inspired bits of comedy - you will love the deadly dull puritans and their miserable song - and lots of audience participation a la panto".

The Derby Telegraph praised the show for its "sensational script writing" and "impressive acting skills". The Stage said, "Adults get as much fun out of this as the children, if not more."

== Horrible Histories: Groovy Greeks ==
Horrible Histories: Groovy Greeks is a 2015 stage show by The Birmingham Stage Company. It is a double bill with Horrible Histories: Incredible Invaders. It has played in theatres such as at Theatre Royal, Brighton, The Mayflower, and Royal & Derngate. The show combined actors and 3D Bogglevision special effects.

=== Development ===
The show was written and directed by Neal Foster. Foster had a "hugely exciting time" bringing the Horrible Histories book to life. Horrible Histories book author Terry Deary guest starred as Zeus, using pre-recorded vocals that were played in various productions. A spokesperson from the show said that it was a solution to the age-old problem: "We all want to meet people from history. The trouble is everyone is dead!".

=== Plot ===
The show included storylines such as Paris and Troy, the defeat of the Persians, the establishment of democracy, an introduction to the Greek Gods, and the first Olympic Games.

=== Critical reception ===
York Press described the humour as "brilliantly irreverent and madcap", likening it to The Simpsons and Reeves & Mortimer. The Northampton Herald & Post thought the show was an "exciting way to introduce history to the young". The Hampshire Chronicle deemed the show, "Fast-paced, irreverent and very, very funny". The Cambridge News said the Horrible Histories stage shows were "always excellent", and thought Groovy Greeks was a prime example. The Blackpool Gazette said the show was "perfectly-pitched family fun". Chelmsford Weekly News said the "main themes [were] cleverly presented in the style of our favourite TV shows". The South Wales Echo deemed it "exciting" and "unique". The Western Mail praised the show for being highly educational and entertaining simultaneously.
