= Horrible Histories: Ruthless Romans (video game) =

2009 video game

- Developer: Virtual Identity
- Publisher: EU: Slitherine Software
- Series: Horrible Histories
- Platforms: Nintendo DS, Wii, Windows
- Release: EU: August 7, 2009
- Genres: Adventure, educational
- Modes: Single-player, multiplayer

Horrible Histories: Ruthless Romans is a 2009 educational adventure video game theme on Ancient Rome as part of the Horrible Histories franchise, which began in 1993. The game was released on Wii, Nintendo DS and Windows and is narrated by Terry Deary, the author of the Horrible Histories book series. It is named after Deary's 2003 book Ruthless Romans, his second on the topic after 1999's Rotten Romans.

== Development ==
In 2008, it was announced that newly formed publisher Slitherine Strategies was to publish games based on the Horrible Histories book series for PC, Nintendo DS and Wii, following their previous title Commander: Europe at War. This constituted their first Horrible Histories release after being successful in securing a video game license from Scholastic. MCVUK noted it was unusual for a publisher to receive a license from a literary work, as video game licenses from film or TV were much more common. They contracted Italian company Virtual Identity as the game's developer, their sophomore effort after the Wii game Pirate Party: Adventures of the Black Corsair. At the time Scholastic noted that fans of the Horrible Histories franchise had been waiting for brand extension into the interactive space, adding that the Slitherine was known for creating historical computer gaming experiences while expressing a hope that the title would draw gamers to the book series. Meanwhile, Slitherine was excited to enter the video gaming sector with this "powerful property", and hoped to create a series of console historical video games based on this license to coincide with the concurrently airing CBBC series Horrible Histories. Slitherine asked Deary to write for the game, to ensure it has the same style and feel of the books.

The name of the new game Horrible Histories Ruthless Romans was announced on March 12, 2009, by Slitherine Strategies and distribution partner Koch Media, along with the fact that the game was being developed by Virtual Identity. Nintendo Life felt it was a great opportunity as the target age for Horrible Histories books are generally entering the video gaming market, while the Roman era provided a multitude of possibilities. The game was presented at the Game Based Learning conference that month, at which Deary professed his belief that "computer games are an ideal opportunity to teach and entertain". Slitherine expressed that the game, their first project targeted toward a younger demographic was both intriguing and challenging. Three different North American release dates were published by GameSpot: January 26, 2010, April 27, 2010 and June 24, 2010 On November 23, 2009 it was announced that Signature Devices subsidiary Graffiti Entertainment has secured a distribution deal for the game across North America. The game was released in English, Français, Italiano, Deutsch, and Español. The Nintendo DS version was intended to be more single-player oriented, focusing on exploration and story. According to IGN, the Nintendo DS version of the game was cancelled. The product launch involved: "various media outlets [being] involved in the trade relationships with a goal of supporting the game through advertising online and in print, and leveraging co-marketing activities with other Horrible Histories licence holders".

== Plot ==
In the game's "Story Mode" the player assumes the role of Rassimus, a young Dacian man that escaped during the peasant riots. Rassimus was captured by Lucius, leader of the fifth Roman Legion, sent there to suppress the Dacian strike. Rassimus later becomes under Lucius Gladius' control and begins training at the gladiator school of Rome to become the champion gladiator and acquire his freedom. The portions of the narrative which set up and progress the story are narrated by Deary, with "accompanying stills presented in comic-book fashion". The game is built up by 3D polygons "with flat features and textures in the style of the book illustrations" by Martin Brown. The game taught players historical information in a "less academic and more engaging form".

== Gameplay ==
The game contains a few different modes, all of which require the player to complete the same minigames; however, the Story Mode also has a narrative that threads the minigames together. The game is a piece of edutainment, deliberately designed for the player to learn as they play. Play involves the player completing various minigames and activities. These include: searching through written content, talking to people, and completing quests, all of which provide clues or inventory that helps the player progress. In order to move up a level in difficulty, the player must first complete a quiz about the Romans. As a gladiator, the player must also fight in the Colosseum. In total, the game contains over 30 minigames. CBBC recommended using a nunchuck when playing the game on a Wii, whereas a D-Pad was used by Nintendo Life's Sean Aaron for directional movement of the playable character. The multiplayer game can be played with up to three people.

== Reception ==
Reception

Aggregate scores
Aggregator	Score
GameRankings	48%
Metacritic	47/100

The game received mixed reviews.

CBBC's NewsRound liked the minigames but disliked the boring quizzes, spartan books, and average graphics; however, it added that the game would teach school-age players a lot about the history featured in their curriculum. NewsRound ultimately recommended the game for fans of the Horrible Histories franchise, while writing that for the average gamer it was a "hit by the skin of its teeth". CinemaBlend thought the game synopsis made it sound like a "bloody good time", but noted that players should understand it's actually an educational adventure game. Games Radar reviewer Charlotte Martyn was sad the gladiator-based game forwent remote-waving combat for button pressing and outline tracing mechanics instead. Ben Hurst of Birmingham Mail thought the game's graphical design fit in well with the rest of the franchise, and thought it was an effective piece of edutainment. Gloria Preston of BoomTown thought the game dumbed down its content too much, presenting what she described as condescending content that didn't give the young players enough credit.

Sean Aaron of Nintendo Life thought the game, which he described as a "mini-game compilation" as disappointing and a waste of the license. However, he praised the "decent" Story Mode narrative, Deary's recounting-to-a-child narration, the intriguing and evolving story, and the exploration of Roman culture; ultimately wondering why Virtual Identity didn't decide to create an adventure game or visual novel instead. He felt the locations were "largely devoid of life" while describing the characters as "static...waxwork dummies", whose repetitive movements minded him of animatronics from Disneyland. GamePeople's Andy Robertson thought the title balanced education and gaming, and noted the challenges of the book-to-game adaptation in the sense that gruesome aspects of history had to be toned down because having children physical reenact them would have been to close to home. Robertson expressed excitement at the next entry in the series; a sequel that did not eventuate. The game became one of Slitherine's biggest titles. A reviewer from Game Space thought the game could have been helped by greater historical accuracy.

Jeux Video expressed the problem of whether to review Ruthless Romans's effectiveness as a game in its own right or as a source of knowledge; ultimately doing both, the site concluded it was "a good pedagogical tool but...unfortunately not a good game". The site thought the game offered a series of "unattractive mini-games" and "crunchy anecdotes".
