= Something Queer Is Going On =

Children's novel

Something Queer is Going On (later redubbed The Fletcher Mysteries) is a children's mystery book series written by Elizabeth Levy and illustrated by Mordicai Gerstein.

The books focus on the cases of the young amateur sleuths Jill, her best friend Gwen, and Jill's almost completely inert Basset Hound Fletcher. Gwen, marked by her annoying habit of tapping her braces, is the more aggressive of the pair, while Jill attempts to be moderate in the investigations.

Something Queer at the Library was adapted into a short film in 1978, starring Melora Hardin.

== Books ==
- Something Queer Is Going On (1973)
- Something Queer at the Ballpark (1975)
- Something Queer at the Library (1977)
- Something Queer on Vacation (1980)
- Something Queer at the Lemonade Stand (1982)
- Something Queer at the Haunted School (1982)
- Something Queer in Rock 'n' Roll (1987)
- Something Queer at the Birthday Party (1989)
- Something Queer in Outer Space (1993)
- Something Queer at the Cafeteria (1994)
- Something Queer at the Scary Movie (1995)
- Something Queer in the Wild West (1997)
- A Hare-Raising Tail (2002)
- The Principal's on the Roof (2002)
- The Mixed-Up Mask Mystery (2003)
- The Mystery of Too Many Elvises (2003)
- The Cool Ghoul Mystery (2003)
