= Elizabeth Levy =

American novelist

- Born: April 4, 1942 (age 84); Buffalo, New York, U.S.
- Occupations: Author; Artist
- Writing career
- Period: 1973–present
- Genres: Children's and Young Adult Literature
- Website: www.elizabethlevy.com

Elizabeth Levy (born April 4, 1942) is an American author who has written over eighty children's books in a variety of genres. Born in Buffalo, New York, she is currently living in New York City. She has appeared as a contestant on Billy on the Street on TruTV. Her cousin is children's author Robie Harris.

== Writing career ==
She has written a long-running series of mystery novels for youngsters under the Something Queer is Going On banner (Something Queer at the Library, Something Queer at the Haunted School, etc.). She is also responsible for the Horrible Histories spin-off series America's Funny But True History. Levy wrote several novelizations of the Star Wars episode Return of the Jedi.

== Selected works ==
- Something Queer is Going On, with Mordicai Gerstein (illustrator), (1973), Delacorte Press, ISBN 978-0385289597 – first in the Something Queer series
- Nice Little Girls (1974), Delacorte Press, ISBN 978-0-440-06207-3
- The Computer That Said Steal Me (1983), Scholastic, ISBN 0-590-32636-8
- Keep Ms. Sugarman in the Fourth Grade, with Dave Henderson (illustrator) (1992), HarperCollins, ISBN 978-0-06-020426-6
- Cheater, Cheater, (1993), Scholastic, ISBN 978-0-590-45865-8
- School Spirit Sabotage: A Brian and Pea Brain Mystery, George Ulrich (Illustrator), George M. Ulrich (Photographer), (1994), HarperCollins, ISBN 978-0-06-023407-2
- My Life as a Fifth-Grade Comedian, (1997), HarperCollins, ISBN 978-0-06-026602-8
- Seventh Grade Tango, (2000), Hyperion Books for Children, ISBN 978-0-7868-0498-6
- Who are you Calling a Woolly Mammoth?: Prehistoric America, Daniel McFeeley (illustrator), J.R. Havlan (additional material), (2000), Scholastic, ISBN 978-0-590-12938-1 – first in the America's Funny But True History series
- Danger & Diamonds: a mystery at sea, Mordicai Gerstein (illustrator), (2010), Roaring Brook Press, ISBN 978-1-59643-462-2
- Paula Danziger's Amber Brown is Tickled Pink, Bruce Coville (co-author), Tony Ross (illustrator), Paula Danziger (inspiration), (2012), G. P. Putnam's Sons, ISBN 978-0-399-25656-1 – a continuation of Danziger's Amber Brown series.
