= The Birmingham Stage Company =

Theatre company in the UK

The Birmingham Stage Company was founded by the Actor/Manager Neal Foster in 1992, with Sir Derek Jacobi and Paul Scofield CH as patrons. It presents productions both on its home stage at The Alexandra Theatre in Birmingham and touring throughout the United Kingdom and internationally, most recently Delhi, Sydney and Dubai. Box Office receipts account for 100% of the company's income.

Although the company has staged productions of plays by American authors such as Tennessee Williams, David Mamet and Arthur Miller, it has concentrated much of its work on collaborating with Britain's top living writers, including David Walliams, David Almond, Michael Morpurgo, Philip Pullman, Terry Deary, and has also enjoyed great success with its productions of Roald Dahl stories such as Fantastic Mr Fox, George's Marvellous Medicine, The Witches and James and the Giant Peach.

The company is strongly associated with the world stage premieres of Horrible Histories including Terrible Tudors, Vile Victorians, Ruthless Romans, Awful Egyptians, Groovy Greeks, Incredible Invaders, Frightful First World War, Woeful Second World War, Wicked Warwick, Horrible Christmas and its record-breaking production of Barmy Britain - Parts 1, 2, 3 & 4, which is the longest running children's show in West End history.

The company has staged several world premieres including Collision by Dominic Leyton, Bridges and Harmonies by Oren Lavie and The Dice House by Paul Lucas.

Actors that have worked with the company include Simon Callow, Richard Dreyfuss, Amanda Donohoe, Corin Redgrave, Diana Coupland, Stephen Mangan, Eva Pope, Barry Stanton and Honor Blackman.
