= The Man Who Walked Between the Towers =

2003 picture book by Mordicai Gerstein

- Front cover, designed by Mordicai Gerstein
- Author: Mordicai Gerstein
- Illustrator: Mordicai Gerstein
- Cover artist: Gerstein
- Genre: Children's picture book
- Publisher: Roaring Brook Press and Millbrook Press
- Publication date: September 5, 2003
- Publication place: United States
- ISBN: 0-7613-1791-0
- OCLC: 52215062
- Dewey Decimal: 791.3/4/092 B 21
- LC Class: GV551 .G47 2003

The Man Who Walked Between the Towers is an American children's picture book written and illustrated by the American author Mordicai Gerstein. Published in 2003, the book recounts the achievement of Philippe Petit, a French man who walked on a tightrope wire between the roofs of the twin towers of the World Trade Center in August 1974. Gerstein won the 2004 Caldecott Medal for his illustrations. The book has been adapted into a film and a ballet.

== Synopsis ==
The story follows the French street performer turned high-wire artist Philippe Petit as he attempts what he describes as "the coup of the century". Once the idea of walking a high-wire between the Twin Towers occurs, Petit becomes obsessed with it. With considerable deliberation and planning, he finally achieves his dream coup one early August morning in 1974. Before the notorious high-wire walk across the Twin Towers, he also walks a high-wire on the Notre-Dame where he lived in Paris, France.

Since the Twin Towers were still under construction, Petit and his friend disguised themselves as construction workers and easily blended in with the rest of the construction crew to sneak up to the south tower. They took around 440 lbs of cable through the elevator to the top 10 floors and waited until nightfall to carry it up 180 stairs onto the roof. At midnight, two more of his friends came to help.

They tied a fishing line through an arrow and shot it across to Philippe 140 feet away from the north tower. However, they missed their mark due to the wind, and the arrow landed on a ledge. Philippe manages to retrieve the arrow by crawling down the ledge of the tower. To this line, he attached a stronger line, which his friends pulled back and he tied it to a cable that was 5/8 of an inch thick. The cable was so heavy that it took them 3 hours to secure the line from across the two towers.

By the dawn of August 7, 1974, they tightened the ropes between the twin towers. Philippe then put on his black shirt and tights (which were specially prepared for the occasion), picked up his 28-foot balancing pole, and started walking on the wire. He felt "alone and absolutely free", as author Mordecai Gerstein writes. The bystanders noticed someone walking between the two towers and quickly notified the police. Officers rushed to the roof of the towers and yelled to Philippe, "You're under arrest!" For almost an hour Philippe walked, danced, and leaped back and forth between the wire. He even laid down to rest. When he felt completely satisfied, he walked towards the tower and held out his wrists towards the handcuffs. They brought Philippe to court and the judge sentenced him to perform in the park for the children of the city. This he did happily, though during his performance kids jerked his wire and Philippe fell but caught himself.

== Adaptations ==
The book was adapted as an animated short film of the same name in 2005 by Michael Sporn for Weston Woods Studios, Inc and it was narrated by Jake Gyllenhaal. The film received the Audience Choice Award for best short film at the 2005 Heartland Film Festival, and the award for Best Short Animation Made for Children at the 2006 Ottawa International Animation Festival. It is included as an extra on the DVD of the Oscar-winning British documentary film Man on Wire (2008).

The book was also adapted as a two-act ballet of the same name at Rowan University in Glassboro, New Jersey. It was conceived, choreographed, and directed by Paule Turner, premiering in December 2008 to exceptionally good reviews. Dancing was the primary medium, and the production also used puppetry, especially during the wirewalking sequence.

The Walk, a biographical drama film directed by Robert Zemeckis and starring Joseph Gordon-Levitt as Philippe Petit, was released in September 2015 by TriStar Pictures.

== Critical reception ==
The Man Who Walked Between the Towers was published to very strong and heartfelt reviews for the story and the illustrations by Gerstein. Kirkus Reviews wrote, "Readers of all ages will return to this again and again for its history, adventure, humor, and breathtaking homage to extraordinary buildings and a remarkable man." Publishers Weekly described it as "Gerstein's dramatic paintings include some perspectives bound to take any reader's breath away. Truly affecting." The School Library Journal wrote, "With its graceful majesty and mythic overtones, this unique and uplifting book is at once a portrait of a larger-than-life individual and a memorial to the towers and the lives associated with them."

== See also ==
- Man on Wire (2008 film) – documentary biopic film about the crossing
- The Walk (2015 film) – biopic drama film about the crossing

Awards
Preceded by My Friend Rabbit	Caldecott Medal recipient 2004	Succeeded by Kitten's First Full Moon
