= Man on Wire =

2008 documentary film by James Marsh

- Theatrical release poster
- Directed by: James Marsh
- Produced by: Simon Chinn
- Starring: Philippe Petit (as himself)
- Cinematography: Igor Martinovic
- Edited by: Jinx Godfrey
- Music by: Michael Nyman; J. Ralph ("WTC Heist Music")
- Production companies: UK Film Council; BBC Storyville; Discovery Films; Red Box Films; Wall to Wall
- Distributed by: Icon Film Distribution (United Kingdom); Magnolia Pictures (United States)
- Release dates: 22 January 2008 (Sundance); 25 July 2008 (US); 1 August 2008 (UK)
- Running time: 94 minutes
- Countries: United Kingdom; United States
- Languages: English; French
- Budget: £1.1 million (approx. $1.9 million)
- Box office: $5.3 million

Man on Wire is a 2008 documentary film directed by James Marsh. The film chronicles Philippe Petit's 1974 high-wire walk between the Twin Towers of New York's World Trade Center. It is based on Petit's 2002 book, To Reach the Clouds, released in paperback with the title Man on Wire. The title of the film is taken from the police report that led to the arrest (and later release) of Petit, whose performance lasted for almost an hour. The film is crafted like a heist film, presenting rare footage of the preparations for the event and still photographs of the walk, alongside re-enactments (with Paul McGill as the young Petit) and present-day interviews with the participants, including Barry Greenhouse, an insurance executive who served as the inside man.

Man on Wire competed in the World Cinema Documentary Competition at the 2008 Sundance Film Festival, where it won the Grand Jury Prize: World Cinema Documentary and the World Cinema Audience Award: Documentary. In February 2009, the film won the BAFTA for Outstanding British Film and the Independent Spirit Award for Best Documentary. As of 2022, it is one of only six documentary films to ever sweep "The Big Four" critics awards (LA, NBR, NY, NSFC) and the only one of those to also win the Academy Award for Best Documentary Feature.

== Production ==
The film's producer, Simon Chinn, first encountered Philippe Petit in April 2005 on BBC Radio 4's Desert Island Discs, after which he decided to try to acquire the film rights to Petit's book, To Reach the Clouds. After months of discussion, Petit agreed, with the condition that he could actively collaborate in the making of the film.

In an interview conducted during the run of Man on Wire at the 2008 Tribeca Film Festival, director James Marsh explained that he was drawn to the story, in part, because it immediately struck him as "a heist movie", though, as Jean François, one of Petit's collaborators, said, "It may have been illegal...but it wasn't wicked or mean." Marsh also said that, as a New Yorker, he saw the film as a gift to the city after the 9/11 attacks and hoped to hear people say after seeing the film that they would always think of Petit and his performance when recalling the World Trade Center's twin towers. Responding to a question about why the towers' destruction in the 2001 attacks is not mentioned in the film, Marsh explained that Petit's act was "incredibly beautiful" and it "would be unfair and wrong to infect his story with any mention, discussion or imagery of the Towers being destroyed."

== Release ==
=== Box office ===
The film opened theatrically in the United States on 29 August 2008, earning $51,392 its first weekend and ranking 37th at the domestic box office. By the end of its run on 5 March 2009, the film grossed $2,962,242 in the United States and Canada and $2,296,327 internationally, for a worldwide total of $5,258,569.

=== Critical response ===
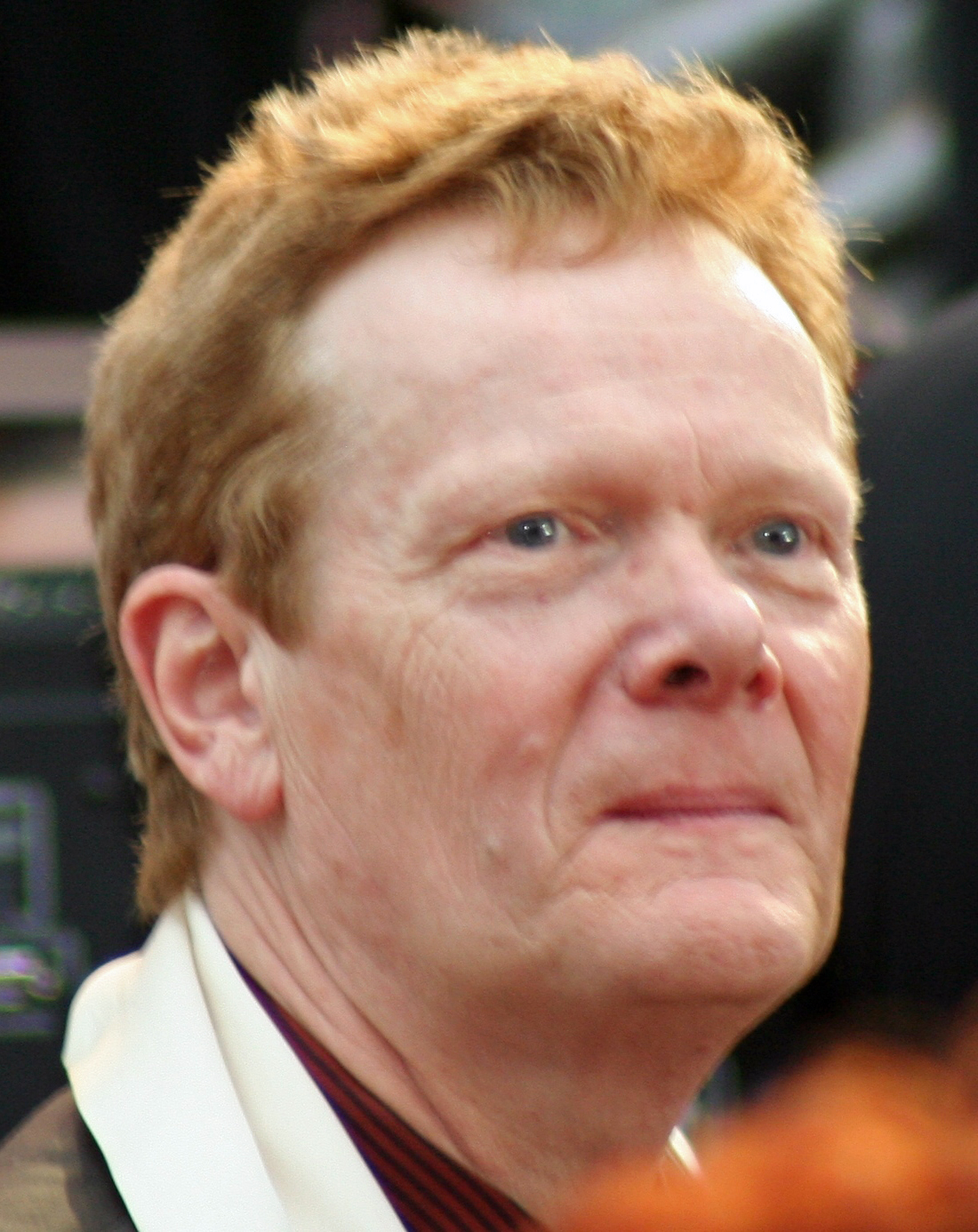
Petit at the 81st Academy Awards

On review aggregator Rotten Tomatoes, Man on Wire has a 100% approval rating based on reviews from 154 critics, with a weighted average score of 8.7/10; the website's critical consensus states: "James Marsh's doc about artist Phililppe Petit's artful caper brings you every ounce of suspense that can be wrung from a man on a (suspended) wire". The film is the fifth-most reviewed to hold an approval rating of 100% on Rotten Tomatoes. On Metacritic, the film has a weighted average score of 89 out of 100 based on reviews from 31 critics, indicating "universal acclaim".

=== Accolades ===
Man on Wire won the Grand Jury Prize and the Audience Award in the World Cinema: Documentary competition at the 2008 Sundance Film Festival; it is the sixth film to pick up both top awards at Sundance, and the first from outside the US. It also won the Special Jury Award and the Audience Award at the Full Frame Documentary Film Festival, the International Audience Award at the Los Angeles Film Festival, and the Standard Life Audience Award at the Edinburgh International Film Festival. In February 2009, the film won the BAFTA for Outstanding British Film, the Independent Spirit Award for Best Documentary, and the award for Best Documentary Film from the Australian Film Critics Association. At the 81st Academy Awards, the film won the award for Best Documentary Feature.

=== Top ten lists ===
The film appeared on many American critics' top ten lists of the best films of 2008. Movie City News found that it appeared on 76 of the 286 different American critics' top ten lists surveyed, which was a tie for the seventh "most mentions" on a top ten list out of all of the films released in 2008.

- 1st – Sheri Linden, The Hollywood Reporter
- 2nd – Kyle Smith, New York Post
- 3rd – Tasha Robinson, The A.V. Club
- 3rd – Ty Burr, The Boston Globe
- 4th – A. O. Scott, The New York Times
- 4th – Liam Lacey, The Globe and Mail
- 4th – Michael Rechtshaffen, The Hollywood Reporter
- 5th – Ann Hornaday, The Washington Post
- 5th – David Ansen, Newsweek
- 5th – Marc Mohan, The Oregonian
- 5th – Ben Mankiewicz, At the Movies
- 6th – Frank Scheck, The Hollywood Reporter
- 6th – Marc Savlov, The Austin Chronicle
- 6th – Scott Tobias, The A.V. Club
- 7th – Josh Rosenblatt, The Austin Chronicle
- 7th – Kenneth Turan, Los Angeles Times (tied with Roman Polanski: Wanted and Desired)
- 7th – Kirk Honeycutt, The Hollywood Reporter
- 7th – Michael Phillips, Chicago Tribune
- 8th – Andrew O'Hehir, Salon
- 8th – Peter Hartlaub, San Francisco Chronicle
- 9th – Lisa Schwarzbaum, Entertainment Weekly
- 10th – Lawrence Toppman, The Charlotte Observer
- 10th – Peter Travers, Rolling Stone
- Top 10 (unordered) – Carrie Rickey, The Philadelphia Inquirer
- Top 10 (unordered) – Dana Stevens, Slate
- Top 10 (unordered) – Joe Morgenstern, The Wall Street Journal
- Top 10 (unordered) – Peter Rainer, The Christian Science Monitor
- Top 10 (unordered) – Robert Mondello, NPR

== Soundtrack ==
Much of the film's soundtrack is derived from the 2006 album The Composer's Cut Series Vol. II: Nyman/Greenaway Revisited, a collection of works by Michael Nyman for films by British director Peter Greenaway.

1. "Fish Beach" – Michael Nyman (from Drowning by Numbers)
2. "History of the Insipid" – Michael Nyman (from The Libertine)
3. "Albatross" – Fleetwood Mac
4. "Dreams of a Journey" – Michael Nyman (from The Piano)
5. "Time Lapse" – Michael Nyman (from A Zed & Two Noughts)
6. "The Disposition of Linen" – Michael Nyman (from The Draughtsman's Contract)
7. "A Fifth of Beethoven" – Walter Murphy
8. "Chasing Sheep Is Best Left To Shepherds" – Michael Nyman (from The Draughtsman's Contract)
9. "An Eye For Optical Theory" – Michael Nyman (from The Draughtsman's Contract)
10. The Lark Ascending – English Northern Philharmonia (composed by Ralph Vaughan Williams)
11. "A Ramble in St. James's Park" – Michael Nyman (from The Libertine)
12. "Passage de L'Egalité" – Michael Nyman (from La Traversée de Paris)
13. "In the Hall of the Mountain King" – Philadelphia Orchestra (composed by Edvard Grieg)
14. "Drowning By Number 2" – Michael Nyman (from Drowning by Numbers)
15. "Trysting Fields/Sheep 'n' Tides" – Michael Nyman (from Drowning by Numbers)
16. "Memorial" – Michael Nyman
17. "Leaving Home" (Opening Titles) – J. Ralph
18. "Leaving Home Sunday Exploration" (End Credits) – J. Ralph
19. "Gnossienne No. 1" – Gheorghe Constantinescu, pianist (composed by Erik Satie)
20. "Gymnopédie No. 1" – Anne Queffélec, pianist (composed by Erik Satie)

== See also ==
- The Man Who Walked Between the Towers (2003) – a Caldecott-winning picture book depicting the crossing
- Let the Great World Spin (2009) – a novel by Colum McCann that incorporates the crossing into its plot
- The Walk (2015) – a biographical drama film about the crossing
- List of films with a 100% rating on Rotten Tomatoes, a film review aggregator website

Awards
Preceded by Enemies of Happiness	Sundance Grand Jury Prize: World Cinema Documentary; 2008	Succeeded by Rough Aunties
