= The Walk (2015 film) =

2015 American film by Robert Zemeckis

- Theatrical release poster
- Directed by: Robert Zemeckis
- Screenplay by: Robert Zemeckis; Christopher Browne
- Based on: To Reach the Clouds by Philippe Petit
- Produced by: Steve Starkey; Robert Zemeckis; Jack Rapke
- Starring: Joseph Gordon-Levitt; Ben Kingsley; Charlotte Le Bon; James Badge Dale
- Cinematography: Dariusz Wolski
- Edited by: Jeremiah O'Driscoll
- Music by: Alan Silvestri
- Production companies: TriStar Pictures; TriStar Productions; ImageMovers; LStar Capital
- Distributed by: Sony Pictures Releasing
- Release dates: September 26, 2015 (New York Film Festival); September 30, 2015 (United States)
- Running time: 123 minutes
- Country: United States
- Languages: English; French
- Budget: $35–45 million
- Box office: $61.2 million

The Walk is a 2015 American biographical drama film directed by Robert Zemeckis, who co-wrote the screenplay with Christopher Browne. It is based on the story of French high-wire artist Philippe Petit's walk between the Twin Towers of the World Trade Center in 1974. The film stars Joseph Gordon-Levitt as Petit, alongside Ben Kingsley, Charlotte Le Bon, James Badge Dale, Ben Schwartz, and Steve Valentine.

Following its premiere at the New York Film Festival, The Walk was released by Sony Pictures Releasing on September 30, 2015 in the United States in IMAX 3D, and on October 9 in regular 2D and 3D. It received positive reviews from critics and grossed $61 million worldwide. The film is dedicated to the victims of the September 11 attacks.

== Plot ==
In 1973, Parisian street performer Philippe Petit bites a hard candy from the audience, damaging his tooth. In the dentist's waiting room, he sees a photo of the Twin Towers in a magazine. Analyzing it, he dreams of walking a tightrope between the towers. Meanwhile, he is evicted from his parents' house by his father, who disapproves of his job. Philippe returns to the circus that inspired him to wire walk as a child and practices in the big top after hours. He is caught by Papa Rudy, who he impresses with his juggling skills. Philippe asks Papa Rudy for tips and advice on knot tying and rope rigging, which Papa Rudy agrees to for compensation.

While performing one day, Philippe meets Annie, a fellow street performer, and they begin a romantic relationship. Annie supports him on his dream and arranges for him to practice at her music school. Meeting Jean-Louis, a photographer, they become friends, and he, the official photographer and second accomplice in his dream. Jean-Louis introduces Jeff, another accomplice with fear of heights, to Philippe and Annie. He explains his idea to use a bow and an arrow tied to a fishing line to get the cable across the Towers. After failing his first real performance by falling into a lake due to anxiety, Philippe walks between Notre Dame Cathedral's towers in Paris to redeem himself. He succeeds with Jean-Louis' support and is arrested in the process, though he receives universal applause and international attention.

Philippe and Annie travel to America, setting a date for the walk as August 6, 1974. He disguises himself to spy and scout out the locations, impaling his foot on a nail in the process. At one point, he meets a fan of Philippe's, seeing him at Notre Dame: Barry Greenhouse, a life insurance salesman who works in the building and becomes another team member. They also meet French-bilingual electronics salesman J.P., amateur photographer Albert, and stoner David. The team goes over the plan several times, deciding Philippe must be on the wire before the construction crews arrive at 7:00 a.m.

On the eve of the event, the team encounters several challenges: being three hours behind schedule, guards on the premises, and nearly dropping the heavy cable off the roof. However, they successfully string up the ropes and set the wires. Philippe begins his walk, explaining that everything around him faded once he started, except the wire and himself, and that for the first time in his life, he felt genuinely thankful and at peace. He successfully crosses the gap between the towers while crowds below cheer him on. Once reaching the other building, Philippe has an urge to return, so he walks back again across the void. At one point, he kneels to his audience and even lies down. The police arrive and threaten to remove him by helicopter if he does not get off. But Philippe relentlessly continues to walk back and forth until he achieves the feat a total of six times in his 45-minute performance and feels confident enough to showboat on occasion before complying. He is arrested on site, with the police and construction workers commending him on his bravery.

Philippe and his accomplices are released, and he decides to stay in New York, but Annie chooses to follow her music dream in Paris. Philippe explains that the building manager gave him a free pass to the observation decks of the towers with the expiry date crossed out and replaced with "forever".

== Cast ==
- Joseph Gordon-Levitt as Philippe Petit
- Ben Kingsley as Papa Rudy
- Charlotte Le Bon as Annie Allix
- James Badge Dale as Jean-Pierre
- Clément Sibony as Jean-Louis
- César Domboy as Jeff
- Benedict Samuel as David
- Ben Schwartz as Albert
- Steve Valentine as Barry Greenhouse
- Mark Camacho as Guy Tozzoli

== Production ==
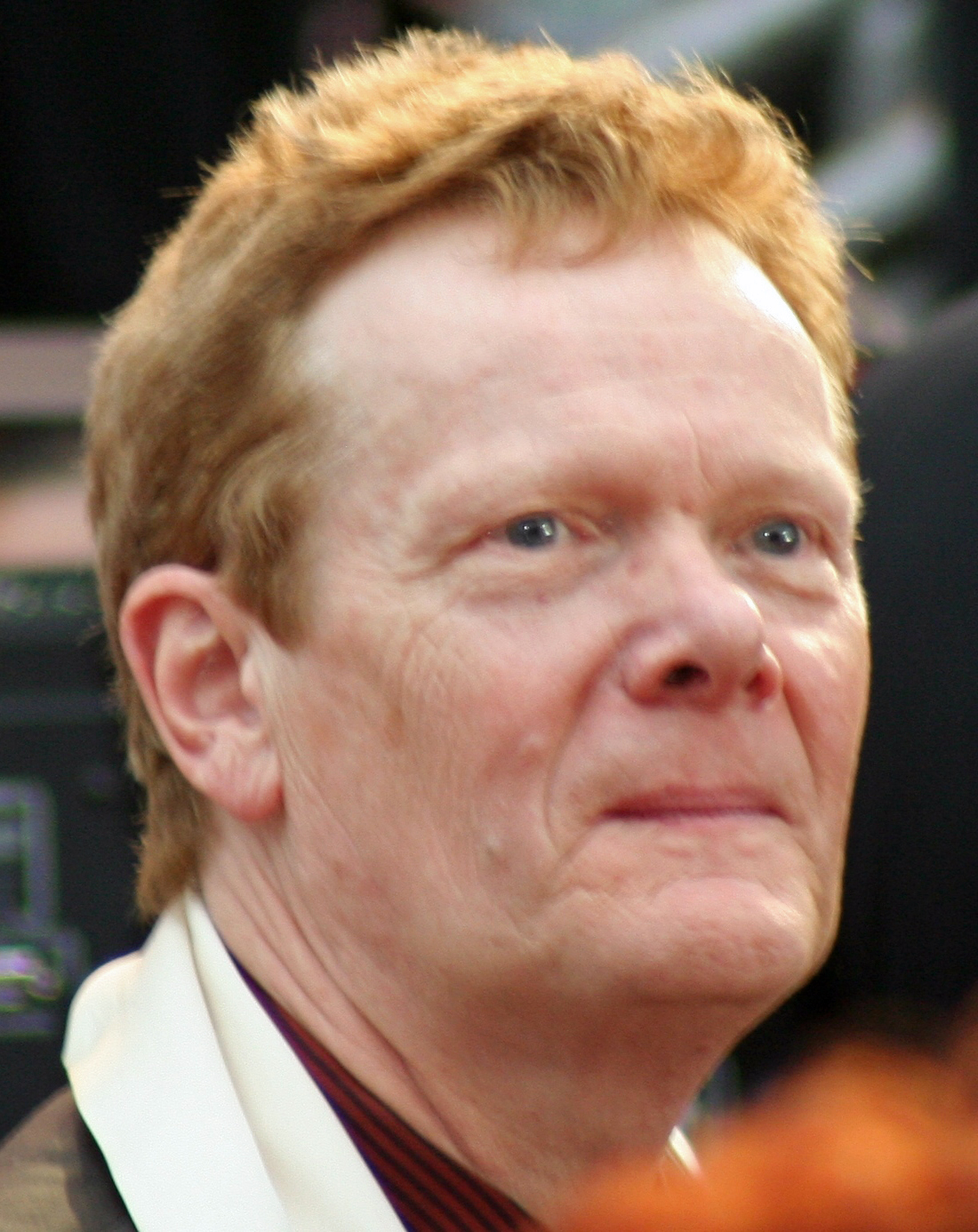
Philippe Petit personally trained Gordon-Levitt how to walk on wire via an eight-day workshop.

On January 23, 2014, it was announced that Robert Zemeckis would direct a film based on the story of Philippe Petit's walk between the Twin Towers of the World Trade Center in 1974. It was also confirmed that Zemeckis wanted Joseph Gordon-Levitt to star in the film as Petit. Zemeckis first came across the story of Petit from the children's book The Man Who Walked Between the Towers. At first, Zemeckis questioned whether or not the story was true as he did not recall the event, saying he "somehow missed it." Zemeckis immediately recognized the potential for a movie, telling Deadline: "To me, it had everything that you want in a movie. It had an interesting character who’s driven, and obsessed, and passionate. It had all this caper stuff. He was an outlaw. There was suspense. And then he did this death-defying thing." By February 2014, Gordon-Levitt was confirmed to star in the film. In April 2014, Charlotte Le Bon, Ben Kingsley and James Badge Dale joined the cast of the film. On May 6, 2014, it was announced that the film would be released on October 2, 2015. In May 2014, Steve Valentine and Ben Schwartz joined the cast of the film. Principal photography began on May 26, 2014, in Montreal, and ended on August 6, 2014.

== Release ==
The film premiered at the New York Film Festival on September 26, 2015. It had an early release in IMAX on September 30, 2015, before a wide theatrical release on October 9, 2015 although it was originally going to be released a week earlier on October 2, 2015 before it was delayed a whole week later. It was the first film to use the current 2015 TriStar Pictures logo.

=== Home media ===
The Walk was released on DVD, Blu-ray and Blu-ray 3D on January 5, 2016. it was released on 4K Ultra HD Blu-ray in the United States on May 19, 2026.

== Reception ==
=== Box office ===
The Walk grossed $10.1 million in North America and $51 million in other territories for a worldwide total of $61.2 million, against a budget of $35 million.

The film was released into IMAX theaters on Wednesday, September 30, 2015. In the opening weekend of its limited release, the film grossed $1.6 million, finishing 11th at the box office. During the first weekend of its wide release a week later, the film grossed $3.7 million, coming in seventh.

=== Critical response ===
The Walk received positive reviews from critics, with praise for Gordon-Levitt's performance, Zemeckis's direction and the visual effects, particularly during the wire walk scene. On Rotten Tomatoes the film has a rating of 83%, based on 277 reviews, with an average rating of 7.1/10. The site's critical consensus reads, "The Walk attempts a tricky balancing act between thrilling visuals and fact-based drama — and like its wire-walking protagonist, pulls it off with impressive élan." On Metacritic, the film has a score of 70 out of 100, based on 41 critics, indicating "generally favorable reviews". On CinemaScore, audiences gave the film an average grade of "A−" on an A+ to F scale, while 72% of PostTrak audiences said that the film was excellent or good.

John Lasser of IGN gave the film an 8.6 out of 10 "great" score, saying, "The Walk is an amazing film, and is so on multiple levels. Joseph Gordon-Levitt puts forth such an easy charm crossed with a fierce determination that it is impossible not to fall in love with Philippe Petit as he attempts what sounds utterly suicidal. The planning and set up of the caper are as fun as any heist movie. And, even though everyone watching knows exactly what the film is building towards, the climactic sequence delivers everything you want and more." Peter Debruge of Variety gave the film a positive review, saying "A filmmaker with a gift for overcoming the seemingly impossible puts audiences in the place of the man who walked between the Twin Towers in this gripping human-interest story." David Rooney of The Hollywood Reporter gave the film a positive review, saying "The film's payoff more than compensates for a lumbering setup, laden with cloying voiceover narration and strained whimsy." Michael Phillips of the Chicago Tribune gave the film two and a half stars out of four, saying "The film gets better as it goes, and the last half-hour (especially in 3-D on an Imax screen) is nearly everything it should be: scary, visually momentous, meticulously realized."

Ann Hornaday of The Washington Post gave the film two and a half stars out of four, saying "The Walk satisfies as an absorbing yarn of authority-flouting adventure and as an example of stomach-flipping you-are-there-ness. The journey it offers viewers doesn't just span 140 feet, but also an ethereal, now-vanished, world." Peter Travers of Rolling Stone gave the film three out of four stars, saying "Expect the worst from the first half — that's before Philippe Petit (Joseph Gordon-Levitt) strings up a wire between the World Trade Center towers. But then, oh, baby, does this movie fly." Richard Roeper of the Chicago Sun-Times gave the film three out of four stars, saying "The last 30 minutes or so are all about the walk. Dariusz Wolski's cinematography is beautiful... and Gordon-Levitt does some of his best acting when he's out on the wire and mostly silent, his face glowing from the sheer crazy joy he's feeling." James Berardinelli of ReelViews gave the film three out of four stars, saying "It's two-thirds of a great film but the slow start and unremarkable first hour hold it back. Still, for those who buy into the precept that good things are worth waiting for, The Walk unquestionably delivers." Brian Truitt of USA Today gave the film two and a half stars out of four, saying "For those who want to feel like they're 110 stories up and living in the clouds, Hollywood does its job conjuring movie magic with a breathtaking Walk to remember."

=== Accolades ===
Award	Category	Recipient	Result
Critic's Choice Awards	Best Visual Effects	The Walk	Nominated
Florida Film Critics Circle	Best Visual Effects	The Walk	Nominated
San Diego Film Critics Society	Best Visual Effects	The Walk	Won
Satellite Awards	Best Visual Effects	Kevin Baillie, Jim Gibbs, Viktor Muller and Sébastien Moreau	Won
St. Louis Gateway Film Critics Association	Best Visual Effects	The Walk	Nominated
Visual Effects Society	Outstanding Supporting Visual Effects in a Photoreal Feature	Kevin Baillie, Camille Cellucci, Viktor Muller, Sebastien Moreau	Nominated
Visual Effects Society	Outstanding Created Environment in a Photoreal Feature	Jim Gibbs, Brian Flora, Laurent Tallefer, Pavel Kolar	Nominated
Visual Effects Society	Outstanding Virtual Cinematography in a Photoreal Project	Shawn Hull, Suzanne Cipolletti, Laurent Taillefer, Dariusz Wolski	Nominated

== See also ==
- The Man Who Walked Between the Towers (2003 book), picture book depicting the crossing
- Man on Wire (2008 film), documentary biopic film about the crossing
