= True Monster Stories =

True Monster Stories, written by Terry Deary, is the first of the non-fiction True Stories series of books. It was published in 1992 by Hippo Books from Scholastic.

== Overview ==
The book details strange, but apparently "true" encounters with a variety of monsters. The book is divided into eight sections including ones dedicated to wild-men and bigfoot/sasquatch, sea creatures (including the Loch Ness Monster), vampires and werewolves.

Each section opens with an introduction into that particular set of monsters. Accounts and brief details then follow of supposed encounters, and each account then ends with a fact file. These fact files present a brief analysis of the events in the accounts, and then present miscellaneous related facts from other similar events.

The book is written so as to let the reader decide for themselves whether they believe the events therein to be true or not.

== Audience ==
As with all the True Stories books, it was aimed at an 11+ market, but found popularity with adults and youngsters alike.

== See also ==
- The Encyclopedia of Monsters
