= Horrible Histories (book series) =

Historical book series by Terry Deary and Peter Hepplewhite

- The former front cover of the Horrible Histories special France
- Author: Terry Deary, Peter Hepplewhite, Neil Tonge
- Illustrator: Martin Brown, Philip Reeve, Mike Phillips
- Cover artist: Martin Brown, Philip Reeve, Kate Sheppard
- Language: English
- Subject: Civilisations, nations, periods, and various cities throughout history
- Genre: Children's, history
- Publisher: Scholastic
- Publication date: 1993–2013
- Publication place: United Kingdom

Horrible Histories is a series of illustrated history books published in the United Kingdom by Scholastic, and part of the Horrible Histories franchise. The books are written by Terry Deary, Peter Hepplewhite, and Neil Tonge, and illustrated by Martin Brown, Mike Phillips, Philip Reeve, and Kate Sheppard.

The first titles in the series, The Terrible Tudors and The Awesome Egyptians, were published in June 1993. As of 2011, with more than 60 titles, the series had sold over 25 million copies in over 30 languages. The books have had tie-ins with newspapers such as The Daily Telegraph, as well as audio-book tie-ins distributed with breakfast cereals.

== History ==
=== Inspiration ===
Terry Deary's involvement with the Horrible Histories series began with his background in drama college and subsequent work as an actor-teacher with the TIE company in Wales. He transitioned into theatre direction and playwriting for children, some of which formed the basis for the later Horrible Histories book series.

The concept for Horrible Histories emerged when Deary's publisher introduced him to the idea. Despite concerns about his historical knowledge, given he had already authored 50 children's novels, the publisher offered factual content to complement his humour. Deary recalled, "The publishers originally asked for a joke book with a history theme. They said, 'Put in a few interesting facts to break up the jokes because some of your jokes are very bad.' And when I looked at the facts, I found they were much more interesting than the jokes. So we ended up with a fact book with jokes. We created a new genre."

=== Development ===
Blitzed Brits, the fifth book in the series, coincided with the 50th anniversary of VE Day in 1995, unexpectedly reaching bestseller lists. This milestone prompted the creation of Woeful Second World War in September 1999, to provide a more balanced portrayal of the Second World War by delving into the wartime experiences of France, Poland, Germany, and Russia.

Celebrating the series' 10th anniversary in 2003, Scholastic initiated the Horrible Histories' Brainiest Boffin competition. This saw 500 applicants answering questions and creating birthday card designs, culminating in a mock TV quiz show with Deary as the quizmaster.

Mad Millennium, commissioned by Phil Clark in 2007, marked Deary's return to theater after 25 years. This paved the way for adaptations of his works into theatrical productions.

In 2007, the original series underwent reissuing with updated content and a refreshed visual design. Simultaneously, the live-action Horrible Histories television series emerged, leading to several books being reissued as show tie-ins. The theme "20 horrible years" guided the reissuing of numerous books in 2013.

By the early 2010s, Deary acknowledged the natural conclusion of the series. While the publishers did not officially terminate it, there was a prevailing sense that it was winding down. Deary's involvement diminished, with other entities like the Birmingham Stage Company and CBBC continuing the franchise's legacy through stage plays and the live-action television adaptation since 2009. The Horrible Histories brand extended into video games, toys, magazines, and a game show.

== Format ==
=== Educational goals ===
Terry Deary, the creator of the Horrible Histories series, offers a distinct perspective on education. He questions conventional schooling, asserting, "If I had it my way, I wouldn't have schools at all. They don't educate, they just keep kids off the streets. But my books educate because they prepare kids for life ... It's outrageous, why don't we start telling children the truth about history? I hope my books do just that."

Beyond entertainment, Deary's Horrible Histories books aim to deepen historical understanding. This integration of entertainment and education challenges the dichotomy between these two aspects. By adopting a skeptical approach to historical accuracy, the series prompts reflection on the reliability of historical information.

Deary's works also contain implicit political messages. Through parallels between contemporary and historical issues, readers are encouraged to ponder morality and patriotism. Rooted in an anti-imperialist perspective, the series frames history as a struggle between powerful entities and marginalized voices. This approach stimulates discussions about present-day societal challenges in relation to historical contexts. Deary's critique extends to conventional education methods, emphasizing critical thinking over conformity."

Deary's persistent critique of conventional education underscores his strong anti-establishment stance. His inclination to challenge authority encourages critical thinking and fosters open discussions, aligning with his unique approach to history and empowerment. His ultimate goal is to convey the emotions and motivations of historical figures. His writing style encourages readers to immerse themselves in history, prompting reflection on the past and their own actions.

=== Literary techniques ===
The books employ diverse media techniques, incorporating elements like cartoons (as depicted in this example by Martin Brown).

Research is pivotal to Deary's process. Collaborating with experts, particularly in specialized fields, lends authenticity to his narratives. He delves into historical contexts to gather a plethora of information, avoiding mundane details like dates. This approach focuses on human experiences rather than strict chronology.

Deary employs diverse literary techniques to bring history to life. His writing mirrors natural speech rhythms, incorporating elements like alliteration and assonance. Poetry is employed for impact rather than adhering to a rigid structure. Direct second-person communication fosters a personal connection between the text and the reader, creating an engaging narrative style.

Utilizing newspaper formats bridges the gap between complex historical content and relatable narratives. This approach blends tabloid-style lightness with in-depth journalism, offering readers a multifaceted perspective. Incorporating newspaper excerpts, diaries, and letters immerses readers in personal viewpoints and subjective experiences.

While Deary addresses recent historical events with sensitivity, he maintains a delicate balance between humor and respect. The series has certain boundaries, such as avoiding descriptions of violence against infants, but Deary advocates for open dialogue rather than avoidance.

The series caters to 'reluctant readers,' favoring concise, non-linear reading experiences. Deary accommodates this preference with brief chapters, interactive elements, and multimedia features such as quizzes.

== Publication history ==
The Horrible Histories series, comprising 23 books, has seen various editions and translations since its inception.

=== English ===
The original Horrible Histories book series encompasses 23 titles. It commenced with the publication of The Terrible Tudors and The Awesome Egyptians in 1993 and 1994 respectively. The series extends to encompass two-in-one volumes, boxed sets, special editions, handbooks, city guides, comic strips, annuals, novelty releases, and more.

In 2013, Terry Deary formally announced the conclusion of the series. Reports indicated that the decision stemmed from Deary exhausting his story ideas and the associated risk of launching new titles without guarantees of success.

=== Translations ===
Horrible Histories has achieved international presence through translations, reaching readers in diverse languages and cultures.

In Denmark, the series is distributed by Egmont Publishing.

In Poland, the series goes by the names Strrraszna historia (Horrible Histories), Strrraszne sławy (Horribly Famous), and Sławy z krypty (Dead Famous). An additional sub-series delves into various aspects of Polish history and society, authored by Małgorzata Fabianowska and Małgorzata Nesteruk, with illustrations by Jędrzej Łaniecki. These titles are exclusive to Poland and have yet to be published in English. Examples include:

- Ci Sprytni Słowianie (The Clever Slavs)
- Pokrętni Piastowie (Piast Dynasty)
- Dynamiczna Dynastia Jagiellonów (Dynamic Jagiellon Dynasty)
- Sakramencki Sarmatyzm (Bloody Sarmatism)
- Atrakcyjni Królowie Elekcyjni (Sovereign Election Appeal)
- Zagmatwane Zabory (Invasive Embroilment)
- Nieznośna Niepodległość (Vexing Independence)

In Portugal, the series is titled Os Horríveis (The Horribles), while in Brazil, it goes by Saber Horrível (Horrible Knowledge). These adaptations aim to stimulate interest in history, geography, science, and other academic subjects. The collection has experienced considerable commercial success.

The Czech version, known as Děsivé dějiny (Horrible History), not only translates the English content but also includes adaptations of the Polish sub-series. This version incorporates titles specific to Czech history, authored by individuals such as Roman Ferstl and Martin Pitro.

In Germany, the series is published under the title Schauderhafte Geschichten.

The Dutch series, Waanzinnig om te weten (Amazing to Know), is a translation and adaptation of the Horrible Histories, Horrible Science, Horrible Geography, and Murderous Maths series. It consists of 36 books as of January 2009.

The series has also been translated into Thai and Spanish. In the Welsh edition, Cut-Throat Celts is known as Y Celtiaid Cythryblus.

In Italy, the series is known as Brutte Storie (title that can both mean "Horrible Histories" and "Horrible Stories"), and have been published since 1997.

== Critical reception ==
The Horrible Histories series has garnered widespread acclaim and positive reception from various sources. It is lauded for its ability to engage young readers and make history captivating. The series is hailed for its presentation, which combines historical accuracy with humor and multimedia elements, successfully targeting young audiences. Janet Allen highlights the series' effectiveness in conveying extensive historical information through a variety of engaging formats such as cartoons, graphs, narration, letters, and wanted posters. The incorporation of diverse media like recipes, quizzes, and newspaper extracts, as well as the use of comic strips, is notably praised. The Daily Telegraph even hailed Terry Deary as "the most influential historian in Britain today."

The series' humor has been recognized as a significant factor in its success, alongside its adept storytelling. Notably, the series is praised for transforming historical non-fiction into an enjoyable reading experience for young individuals, pioneering a new genre. Jerome De Groot's Consuming History highlights Horrible Histories as a series that showcases the dynamic and flexible nature of historical narratives in children's literature. The books' playful and irreverent tone, coupled with their tactile approach to history, is celebrated for its appeal to young audiences. The inclusion of re-printable recipes and interactive "what would you do?" sections enhances the series' interactivity. Groot compares the series to Glenn Thompson's For Beginners comic books from the 1980s. The series is commended for its effective use of illustration and textual interplay, contributing to its engaging nature. While the series' personalized writing style and visual components can hinder their effectiveness as read-aloud books, they are well-suited for independent reading. Consuming History suggests that the series' popularity stems from its tone and style rather than its content.

Judy Arnall, discussing the portrayal of violence in games and historical contexts, points out that children often encounter much more disturbing events in real-life scenarios than those depicted in the series. She cites The Wicked History of the World as providing valuable context for understanding this perspective.

=== Controversy ===
Horrible Histories has faced some controversies. The book Bloody Scotland drew criticism from the Scottish Separatist Group, who claimed it presented a "UK centric, anti-Scottish viewpoint of Scottish history." The group highlighted a haggis recipe in the book that humorously referenced cooking the dish until it resembled a flattened hedgehog after lorries had run over it. The group reported their concerns to the Commission for Racial Equality, although their claim was rejected.

Cruel Kings and Mean Queens faced backlash from the National Trust due to its humorous portrayal of Prince Charles, the trust's patron, and Queen Elizabeth II. The book Slimy Stuarts has also been criticized for allegedly presenting anti-Catholic views.

In the series, there are two books titled The Horrible History of the World and The Wicked History of the World. However, these books are identical, differing only in their headings. This confusion was further compounded by the planned release of compact and mini editions at the end of 2007. Similar instances occurred with books like The Horribly Huge Quiz Book/Massive Millennium Quiz Book, and The Mad Millennium/Mad Millennium Play. Additionally, multiple covers were created for Horrible Christmas, along with new paperback, compact, and mini editions.

Some of the information presented in the series is contested. For instance, the books claim that Shakespeare fabricated the malicious deeds attributed to Richard III and portray Caligula as insane. These inaccuracies are addressed in the song "It's Not True" featured in the CBBC TV series. While Promoting Reading for Pleasure in the Primary School asserts that the series offers substantial depth in its subject matter, some critics argue that the books are providing alternate readings of history deliberately. The series challenges the conventional narratives.

The book Woeful Second World War is the only one in Polish edition of the series to include afterword from the translator Małgorzata Fabianowska, pointing out several inaccuracies written by Deary in the original version. The afterword disputes several of Deary's claims, including that Kresy (lost by Poland after Soviet invasion of 1939) belonged to the USSR 20 years prior, Auschwitz concentration camp only supplied IG-Farben with forced labour, or that British broke the Enigma machine. Inaccuracies regarding Siege of Leningrad or Polish cavalry charges myth are also pointed out.

The series also questions the authority of teachers. For example, sections like 'Test Your Teacher' humorously assert that teachers don't know everything and imply that formal education may provide a sanitized version of history, omitting intriguing aspects. This has led to the argument that histories that lack sensational events are deemed uninteresting to younger readers. The use of non-linear structures in the books has raised concerns about potentially promoting shorter attention spans compared to longer narratives.

=== Awards and nominations ===
Best Book with Facts in the Blue Peter Book Awards 2000. Best Book for Knowledge Award at the Blue Peter Book Awards 2001. Terry Deary consistently tops the list of most-borrowed non-fiction children's authors each year, based on Library Survey figures. In a 2005 survey conducted by The Guardian, Deary was voted the fifth most popular living children's author.

== Spin-offs ==
- Horrible Geography, written by Anita Ganeri and illustrated by Mike Phillips
- Horrible Science, written by Nick Arnold and illustrated by Tony de Saulles
- Horribly Famous (previously known as Dead Famous), featuring writing and illustration by a variety of authors and illustrators
- Totally (formerly titled The Knowledge), with contributions from a range of authors and illustrators.
  - Foul Football, a spinoff of Totally
  - Murderous Maths, a spinoff of Totally, written by Kjartan Poskitt and illustrated by various artists, most commonly Philip Reeve
  - Flaming Olympics, a spinoff of Totally, written by Michael Coleman and illustrated by Mike Phillips
- America's Funny But True History, authored by Elizabeth Levy
- Boring Bible, a collection of twelve books written and illustrated by Andy Robb
- Fair Dinkum Histories, penned by Jackie French and illustrated by Peter Sheehan
- Horrible Canadian Histories, written by Claire Mackay and Illustrated by Bill Dickson
- Deadly! Irish History, written and illustrated by John Farrelly
