= Horrible Histories: Frightful First World War (exhibition) =

Frightful First World War was an exhibition that was held at the Imperial War Museum North from 24 May 2008 to 4 January 2009. It was based on the Horrible Histories book of the same name – one of the most popular of the series. It was produced in partnership with Terry Deary and Scholastic Children's books. The exhibition was free.

== Contents ==
The exhibition "sets author Terry Deary's words and artist Martin Brown's visuals alongside the Imperial War Museum’s collections" to tell the story of the First World War.

The Trench Action Station interactive allowed participants to "explore the terrible conditions in the trenches through feely boxes, and smell to experience what creatures and terrible stenches would have kept the soldiers company".

== Development ==
The exhibition was "specially designed for younger visitors" by Ingenious Creative of Macclesfield, Cheshire, and was created "to commemorate the 90th anniversary of the end of the First World War". Terry Deary said: "Horrible Histories are black comedy for young readers so the First World War is an appropriate subject. It was the gallows' humour of the people that helped them survive the horrors. It's a lesson in how humanity copes with the worst the world can throw at us. That's what education should be about – preparing us for life, the horrible as well as the good".

Culture24 explains: "Museums can sometimes have a reputation of being forbidding but this exhibition has set out to prove that this doesn't have to be the case. Terry Deary is strongly aware of the importance of humour in telling stories and engaging the audience. As he says: 'People like to laugh. But when the laughter dies you are maybe left with something deeper that remains behind. Knowledge or understanding or both.'"

== Reception ==
Culture24 said "This is a fresh and unique landmark exhibition, combining the populism of the Horrible Histories books with the distinction of the IWM collection, and is especially important as this will be the last major anniversary when there will still be any veterans alive who were there at the time."

The photographs were Terry Deary's favourite part of the exhibition: "You can look at them a hundred times and be drawn in to a world of people who are long dead yet whose lives were frozen forever in the click of a shutter".
