= Refuweegee =

Glasgow-based charity

Refuweegee is a charity, launched in December 2015, to provide assistance to refugees as they arrive in Glasgow, Scotland. The charity provides welcome packages to every refugee that arrives in the city that include essentials like food, blankets and toiletries, items that are emblematic of the city like a “People Make Glasgow” umbrella, and finally a personal welcome letter written by a local. The charity provides other services, for example, it has provided Glasgow City Council’s “Trafficking Awareness Raising Alliance (TARA)” service with, alongside other groups, digital devices to survivors of human trafficking.

The charity has received donations from Tunnock's, and Glasgow City Marketing Board. Celtic F.C. Foundation has made a donation each year since 2017, and as of 2021 continues to make annual donations.

At the start of the COVID-19 pandemic in 2019, the charity also started providing support packages to people who were struggling to get by. Glasgow's North East Food Bank donated stock to be included in these packages. As demand for their support increased, the Scottish Government provided funding to allow the service to continue.

The charity was found by Selina Hales in response to the news of refugees of the Syrian civil war being taken in and homed in Glasgow. In recognition of her work Hales was awarded an Honorary Fellowship by the Royal Scottish Geographical Society.
