= Eden Ross Lipson =

American journalist

Eden Ross Lipson (February 2, 1943 – May 12, 2009) was an editor at The New York Times, a scholar and children's books writer.

Lipson studied political science at the University of California, Berkeley, graduating in 1964. She actively worked as an aide for Sen. Eugene J. McCarthy's 1968 presidential campaign. After working in city planning for the Government of New York City, she joined The New York Times Book Review in 1974. She served as the children's book editor from 1984 until retiring in 2005.

Lipson wrote The New York Times Parent's Guide to the Best Books for Children (three editions, latest 2000) and frequently discussed children's literature on radio and television. She also wrote a children's book, Applesauce Season, that was illustrated by Mordicai Gerstein and published by Roaring Brook Press a few months after her death.

Lipson oversaw a library program at Public School 111 (the Adolph S. Ochs School) in Manhattan from 2004 until her death. She also served on the board of the Molly National Journalism Prize, an award founded by The Texas Observer in honor of the late journalist Molly Ivins.
