= Horrible Histories: The Mad Millennium =

The Mad Millennium is a Horrible Histories musical play written by Terry Deary and first performed in 1999. The play is about 7 kids in a history lesson with a new history teacher and their only hope is to race through the centuries. It is the only HH play written into a published book - The Mad Millennium: A Play by Terry Deary.

== History and development ==
The play premiered at Sherman Theatre, Cardiff on June 4, 1999. It was directed by fellow TIE Company colleague Phillip Clarke. Clarke originally commissioned Deary to write a play for his theatre, the notion being to create a large-scale theatre adaption of a successful book series. The Mad Millennium marked Deary's return to playwriting after pursuing a book career. It was the very first Horrible Histories stage adaptation created to coincide with an exhibition at National Museum Cardiff.

Rather than creating "a bit of light entertainment" like a pantomime, Deary based the play around the concept of "a group of young people discovering themselves through history". The tone of the play didn't divert too much from the book series as Deary wanted it to be recognisable as a part of the franchise. This included poems, game show parodies, and fictional account which are based on basic facts. Deary looked for major turning points in history and tried to find ways to dramatise those events. He wanted to make a statement about education by exploring the threatening way kids live in constant fear that whenever they are learning about something there will always be a test at the end.

Deary said that the twist at the end of the "fun and fast moving" play shows that history is in the end about both the facts and figures, yet also the interpretations and enjoyment. He wanted adults to come away thinking "wow, the layers of meaning in that!"

== Synopsis ==
The play covers the British history of the last 1000 years. It is a musical, and is interactive. The plot revolves around 7 kids who start the play with tensions and conflict amongst themselves. They begin to reenact scenes from history due to the drama teacher Miss Game wanting to make history more fun (the unseen yet villainous history teacher Master Minde foreshadows a horrible test). The kids have parallels to the historical characters they play - and often share the same first name. As the plot evolves, the children's relationships develop, and they begin to become more tolerant of one another. They end up giving Master Minde a history test; only it is about "interpretations of history...not about facts", so he fails and is knocked unconscious. Taking his mask off, it is revealed that he was in fact Miss Game in disguise.

== Reception ==
According to Terry Deary's website, the play "broke box-office records when it opened at Cardiff's Sherman Theatre in Summer 1999."
