= Boring Bible =

Christian book series for children

Boring Bible is a series of 12 books, as one of the numerous spin-offs of the Horrible Histories franchise. The books are authored and illustrated by Christian writer and cartoonist Andy Robb, and intend to help children understand who God is (as revealed in the Bible) and how he has operated throughout history in both the Old Testament and New Testament eras. Six of the books cover the entirety of the Bible and the remaining six books cover particular themes such as Christmas, Easter, God, the church, and how to read the Bible. The series is still in print as of June 2013.

The book covers of Boring Bible title Hyper Holy Happenings.

The book covers of six Boring Bible titles.

== Production ==
Andy Robb notes that he had to find a formula that would appeal to children, "my kids had a number of books that they looked at, that had been really nicely designed and well produced, but they went through a few pages and then just put them down. I thought, why aren't they reading them?". He then found out about the Horrible Histories books and liked their design so much he decided to use them as a template for his own books. He explains, "With a publisher we decided to develop a range of books called the Boring Bible, which showed the Bible isn't boring, but had loads of facts, loads of fun and loads of cartoons; but actually in a way was using that style of bringing alive the Bible to the kids and they really took off. I enjoyed that; kids seemed to like that, so I found my niche". Robb explained that just like with Horrible Histories, he used multimedia to engage the reader, "It's a bit by default rather than design; but as I say lots of humour, lots of illustration and cartoons, but also lots of facts". He added that he wanted to retain the core focus of the books, despite the tangents, "I'm a truth man as well, so I didn't want to dilute any of the truth of the gospel in the process, which is easy to do".

== Original books ==
- Ballistic Beginnings (2003) – Creation
- Bible Busters (2003) – How to read the Bible
- The Big Boss (2005) – Referring to God
- Catastrophic Kings (2005) – Biblical Kings
- Christmas Crackers (2005) – Christmas
- Crazy Christians (2003) – What is a Christian
- Eggs-traordinary Easter (2006) – Easter
- Hyper Holy Happenings (2003) – The church
- Hotchpotch Hebrews (2003) – Jewish people
- Magnificent Moses (2003) – Moses
- Saints Alive (2003) – The church
- Super Son (2004) – Referring to Jesus

== Instant lesson material ==
There is also a teaching aid sub-series known as the Instant Lesson Material books. These books focus on specific passages and stories through the Bible and comment on them with cartoons and pictures to make them easier to understand.

The sub-series is as follows:

- Instant Lesson Material: Abraham to Jacob
- Instant Lesson Material: The Life of Jesus
- Instant Lesson Material: The Prophets
- Instant Lesson Material: New Testament Heroes
- Instant Lesson Material: The Book of Acts
