= Mordicai Gerstein =

American writer (1935–2019)

Mordicai Gerstein (November 24, 1935 – September 24, 2019) was an American artist, writer, and film director, best known for illustrating and writing children's books. He illustrated the comic mystery fiction series Something Queer is Going On.

== Life and career ==
Gerstein was born in Los Angeles, California. He attended the Chouinard Art Institute in Los Angeles before getting a job at an animation studio in New York. There he designed characters and came up with ideas for TV commercials. He illustrated the Something Queer Is Going On series, written by Elizabeth Levy, from 1973 to 2003. He won the 2004 Caldecott Medal for U.S. picture book illustration, recognizing The Man Who Walked Between the Towers (Roaring Brook Press, 2003), which he also wrote. Created in response to the September 11 attacks, it features the story of Philippe Petit's unauthorized high-wire walk between the Twin Towers of the World Trade Center on August 7, 1974.

Gerstein directed four holiday specials for NBC TV in the late 1970s and early 1980s based on the Berenstain Bears book series, the most notable being The Berenstain Bears' Christmas Tree, which premiered on December 3, 1979.

Gerstein lived in Northampton, Massachusetts. He was Jewish.

== Bibliography ==
Gerstein wrote and illustrated the following books:

- Moose, Goose, and Mouse (2021, with Jeff Mack)
- I Am Hermes! (2019)
- The Boy and the Whale (2017)
- I Am Pan! (2016)
- The Sleeping Gypsy (2016)
- The Night World (2015)
- You Can't Have Too Many Friends! (inspired by Drakestail; 2014)
- The First Drawing (2013)
- How to Bicycle to the Moon to Plant Sunflowers (2013)
- Dear Hot Dog (2011)
- A Book (2009)
- Minifred Goes to School (2009)
- Leaving the Nest (2007)
- The White Ram: A Story of Abraham and Isaac (2006)
- Carolinda Clatter! (2005)
- The Old Country (2005)
- The Man Who Walked Between the Towers (2003)
- Sparrow Jack (2003)
- What Charlie Heard (2002)
- Fox Eyes (2001)
- Queen Esther the Morning Star (2001)
- The Absolutely Awful Alphabet (1999)
- Noah and the Great Flood (1999)
- Victor (1998)
- The Wild Boy (1998)
- Stop Those Pants! (1998)
- Jonah and the Two Great Fish (1997)
- Behind the Couch (1996)
- Bedtime Everybody! (1996)
- The Giant (1995)
- The Shadow of a Flying Bird (1994)
- The Story of May (1993)
- The New Creatures (1991)
- The Sun's Day (1989)
- Beauty and the Beast (1989)
- William, Where Are You? (1989)
- The Mountains of Tibet (1987)
- The Seal Mother (1986)
- Tales of Pan (1986)
- The Room (1985)
- Roll Over (1984)
- Prince Sparrow (1984)
- Follow Me! (1983)
- Arnold of the Ducks (1983)

Gerstein wrote two books that were illustrated by his wife, Susan Yard Harris:

- Daisy's Garden (1995)
- Anytime Mapleson and the Hungry Bears (1990)

Gerstein also illustrated numerous books by other writers, including:

- Frankenstein Moved In On The Fourth Floor (1981), by Elizabeth Levy
- Dracula Is A Pain in the Neck (1983), by Elizabeth Levy
- Gorgonzola Zombies in the Park (1993), by Elizabeth Levy
- Apple Sauce Season (2009), by Eden Ross Lipson
- How to Paint the Portrait of a Bird (2007), by Jacques Prévert (1900–1977)
- Something Queer Is Going On (1973 to 2003), mystery series by Elizabeth Levy

== Filmography ==
- A Nose (1966)
- The Room (1968)
- The Berenstain Bears' Christmas Tree (1979)
- The Berenstain Bears Meet Bigpaw (1980)
- The Berenstain Bears' Easter Surprise (1981)
- The Berenstain Bears' Comic Valentine (1982)
- Long Ago and Far Away: "Beauty and the Beast" (1990)

== Awards ==
- 2004: Caldecott Medal for The Man Who Walked Between the Towers
- 2004: Boston Globe–Horn Book Award children's book category for The Man Who Walked Between the Towers
- 2006: Carnegie Medal for Excellence in Children's Video
- 2006: National Jewish Book Award in the Illustrated Children's Book category for The White Ram: A Story of Abraham and Isaac
