= The Encyclopedia of Monsters =

The Encyclopedia of Monsters is a 1981 book by Daniel Cohen that presents popular myths regarding monsters.

== Description ==
The Encyclopedia of Monsters is a book about creatures from folklore, legend, and documented sightings. The book is divided into chapters about humanoids like Bigfoot, land-based monsters, flying monsters, phantoms, "strange visitors", sea monsters, and creatures from folklore.

Each chapter includes a section of relevant illustrations and photographs as well as a bibliography.

== Reception ==
In the January 1992 edition of Dragon (Issue #177), John C. Bunnell thought this book would be "of considerable value to gamers in search of creatures and plots on which to hang adventures." Although Bunnell found the subject matter to be wide-ranging, he thought that Cohen's summaries sometimes tended towards oversimplification. While Bunnell noted that Cohen tried to be objective in his assessments, he said that "Cohen’s writing style is not always as even-handed as his conclusions. While his introductions and wrap-ups are done in his own voice, journalistic qualifiers are often absent from the stories themselves. That sometimes makes the material sound more authoritative than it really is, and it tilts the books away from unbiased reportage into the realms of speculation." While Bunnell cautioned readers to treat the book as popular journalism rather than scholarship, he concluded by recommending the book, saying, "Everyone from AD&D game campaigners to players of espionage and near-future games should find useful accounts in Cohen’s compilations."

== See also ==
- True Monster Stories
