= The Fire Thief =

2005 novel by Terry Deary

- First edition
- Author: Terry Deary
- Cover artist: David Wyatt
- Language: English
- Series: The Fire Thief Trilogy
- Genre: Fantasy novel
- Publisher: Kingfisher Books
- Publication date: 2005
- Publication place: United Kingdom
- Media type: Print (hardcover & paperback)
- Pages: 250 pg
- ISBN: 978-0-7534-6118-1
- OCLC: 123032558
- Preceded by: –
- Followed by: Flight of the Fire Thief

The Fire Thief was written by Terry Deary and is the first book in The Fire Thief Trilogy. It was published in 2005. The book is about Prometheus, the Greek Titan who, in Greek mythology, is said to have stolen fire from the gods and given it to humans.

The other two books in the series are Flight of the Fire Thief (2006) and The Fire Thief Fights Back (2007).

== Plot ==
The story tells of Prometheus when he is chained to a rock and about to have his liver ripped out by the Fury, but instead he is freed by the hero Hercules. He grabs the Fury, breaks its neck and runs away after he has been freed from the mountain he was chained to, by his cousin Zeus, the Greek god of lightning and ruler of the sky. Zeus sends him on a quest to find a true human hero. He gives Prometheus a ring because he promised that Prometheus will always be chained to that rock. This means that Zeus can always find him as well. Prometheus travels into the future with a pair of magical wings. He lands in Eden City and is helped by Uncle Edward and young Jim, a pair of robbers. The Fury is bent on revenge and Theus must complete this task while avoiding the Fury, who is supposed to eat his liver every day for eternity. There, Jim and Uncle Edward stay at Storm Inn where they meet January Storm. They came to Eden City to steal riches from the Mucklethrift Manor. They usually put a play on and while they are doing it, Jim goes and steals the riches. When Prometheus came, he was strong so he could help the robbers carry the coffin which they put the stolen goods in. They are successful but Mayor Walter Tweed catches them and demands to get 1/3 of the stolen riches. The Mayor makes a fake deal with Uncle Edward pretending that the police would not catch the robbers, Uncle Edward, and Jim.
