= Chris Oxlade =

Children's information book writer

Chris Oxlade (born 1961) is an author, editor and illustrator of children's information books. He has written over 200 titles.

According to data from the Public Lending Right, Oxlade was the 100th most borrowed children's author from UK public libraries in 2011–2012.
