= History of America =

History of America may refer to:

- The History of the United States
- The History of the Americas
- The European colonization of the Americas
