= Arthur Silva White =

Fellow of the Royal Society of Edinburgh

Arthur Silva White FRSE FRSGS (1859–1932) was a 19th/20th-century British administrator, geographer and travel author. He was a founder of the Royal Scottish Geographical Society in December 1884.

== Life ==
He was born at 2 Hanover Terrace in Kensington, London on 1 February 1859 one of 15 siblings and (three half-siblings) of Edward Fox White, a surveyor, and his wife, Julia Gomes Silva (1834-1871). His mother was daughter of Moses Gomes Silva, a Portuguese Jew and (prior to abolition in the British colonies in 1833) prominent slave-owner, who became Marshall General of Jamaica in 1831. Arthur was raised as a Christian. In March 1871 his mother died in childbirth of her 15th child, also Edward Fox White. The huge family were then living at 13 Belsize Park Gardens in the Hampstead district.

He was a member of the Societe Africaine de France. From 1884 to 1892 he was editor of the Scottish Geographical Magazine. He was Secretary of the Scottish Geographical Society for the same period.

In 1887 he was elected a Fellow of the Royal Society of Edinburgh. His proposers were James Geikie, Sir John Murray, Alexander Buchan, and Hugh Robert Mill.

He was brother to Edward Silva White, who together with their half brother, Edward Fox White, ran a fine art dealers "E & E Silva White" first in London then at 104 George Street in Edinburgh.

== Family ==
He married Catherine Bennett who died young. They had no children.

After a decade of travelling he married Beatrice Brookes and they had two children: Cyril and Elfrida.

== Publications ==
- Development of Africa (1890)
- Africa and the European Powers (article in Harper's Magazine Nov 1891)
- Sir Samuel Baker
- From Sphinx to Oracle, Through the Libyan
- The Expansion of Egypt under Anglo-Egyptian Condominium (1899)
- Britannic Confederation
- Law of Thought
- Isolation in Thought
