= Royal Scottish Geographical Society =

Educational charity

- Formation: 4 December 1884
- Location: Perth, Scotland
- Members: 2,700 (October 2019)
- President: Iain Simpson Stewart
- Chief Executive: Mike Robinson
- Website: rsgs.org

The Royal Scottish Geographical Society (RSGS) is an educational charity based in Perth, Scotland, founded in 1884. The purpose of the society is to advance the subject of geography worldwide, inspire people to learn more about the world around them, and provide a source of reliable and impartial geographical information.

The RSGS delivers these core aims by producing a quarterly magazine, an annual programme of Inspiring People talks, a research journal, and a range of other publications. From its base in Perth, the society also operates a volunteer-led visitor centre, hosts an array of international exhibitions each year, and curates an archive dating back to its roots in 1884.

In addition, by working with partners around Scotland and further afield, the society encourages the teaching of geography in the curriculum, produces classroom resources for teachers, and facilitates thinking on issues such as climate change, city development and transport infrastructure, amongst many others.

Between 1904 and 1905, Sir Ernest Shackleton worked as the secretary of the society before resuming his career as an Antarctic explorer. Sir Edmund Hillary, Neil Armstrong, Sir Ranulph Fiennes, Dame Freya Stark, Sir David Attenborough and Karen Darke have all received RSGS medals. James Cameron and the Dalai Lama, among others, have written for their magazine.

Since 2009, the society has been housed within Lord John Murray House in Perth; the society's visitor centre is next door in the Fair Maid's House, the oldest secular building in the city. The society was formerly based in the University of Strathclyde from 1994 to 2008, and before that at 10 Randolph Crescent in Edinburgh.

== History ==
The originator of the idea for a national society of geography in Scotland was John George Bartholomew, of the Bartholomew family and map-making company in Edinburgh. Bartholomew felt that there was a low quality of map craftsmanship within Britain and a lack of geographical societies as compared with the rest of Europe, and set out to investigate the situation in other countries, particularly in Germany. As a result of this he began work in establishing a geographical society for Scotland.

Bartholomew was assisted by Mrs A. L. Bruce, the daughter of the explorer David Livingstone. She herself was a keen geographer, with a particular interest in Africa. Arthur Silva White, an experienced traveller and travel author, was also sought, and served as the Society's Secretary for the first 8 years. They sought the support of Professor James Geikie, Professor of Geology at the University of Edinburgh. Geikie had a keen interest in the advancement in geographical research and teaching, willingly giving his support to the project, and in December 1884 The Scottish Geographical Society (S.G.S.) was established. Recruiting members from many of Edinburgh's most prominent men and women, the Society managed to establish support from influential quarters. The S.G.S. encouraged members from scientific and academic backgrounds, providing a broad yet intellectual emphasis to its aims, as well as members of the general public, who joined more through interest or knowledge of the new discoveries than from any real interest in their own country.

The aims of the Society were diverse, yet exploration was seen as having less emphasis than research and education. The first edition of the Scottish Geographical Magazine stated: –

"... it is therefore one of the first objectives of the Scottish Geographical Society to advance the study of geography in Scotland: to impress the public with the necessity and inestimable value of a thorough knowledge of geography in a commercial, scientific or political education."

The SGS concentrated on education and research, against a backdrop interest in exploration and discovery, and the gathering together and dissemination of information from such activities. The SGS was founded at that point in the nineteenth century when the scientific climate prevailing in Scotland, and in particular Edinburgh, influenced the direction of the Society's goals and activities. With many academics as members, education and research were important issues to the Society.

At that time Edinburgh was the focus of geography within Scotland, with an active and lively scientific community from within which the seeds of a more balanced and scientific approach to geography would emerge. Yet, within a year of its foundation, the Scottish Geographical Society had established branches in Dundee, Aberdeen and Glasgow to cater for the strong local interest and active participation in its work.

Chief amongst the RSGS's early achievements were its support for the quietly successful Scottish National Antarctic Expedition (1902–04), and the establishment of Scotland's first professorship in Geography, at the University of Edinburgh.

== Membership ==
Membership of RSGS is open to all, regardless of geographical location. Member benefits include:

- Free attendance at c.90 Illustrated Talks per year which are held at 13 RSGS Local Groups throughout Scotland;
- Four editions of The Geographer magazine, per year;
- Free access to the Society's learned periodical, Scottish Geographical Journal, online or in hard copy;
- Access to the Society's research collections, including its library, from which books may be borrowed, and its map and photograph collections, which may be consulted by prior arrangement with the Curator;
- Other benefits include excursions and field trips, travel offers and competitions.

== Collections ==
The Society holds collections of historical and contemporary maps, atlases, books, journals, photographs, film, drawings, paintings, scientific instruments, personal papers, and artefacts. These materials relate to the wider world, with a particular focus on Scotland and the regions explored and settled by Scots. Items in the collection document aspects of Scotland's heritage and often provide the only record of people, places, and events. Notable holdings include photographs of early polar exploration, photographs by and of explorers and mountaineers, expedition reports and diaries, and the RSGS's own archive. The collection also contains early maps of Scotland, with the oldest item dating from 1573. While many items are held in the RSGS headquarters in Perth, the majority of the books are managed by the Andersonian Library at the University of Strathclyde in Glasgow. Films, including footage of the 1904 Scottish Antarctic Expedition, are lodged with the Scottish Screen Archive in Glasgow. A team of volunteers manages the collections, which members can view by appointment.

== Residences ==
The RSGS began a programme of residency in 2014, bringing on board specialists to help deliver its charitable aims and specific geographic output. The positions are all voluntary.

=== Explorers-In-Residence ===
The first Explorer-in-Residence was awarded to Craig Mathieson, a record-breaking Scottish explorer who established the Polar Academy in 2013, a charity which takes young adults to polar regions in order to improve their confidence. More recently, husband and wife team Luke and Hazel Robertson were the second recipients of the title. As part of their work with the RSGS, the pair travelled to Alaska in 2017 in an attempt to be the first to trek south to north across the country. The trip ended abruptly just short of the finish line as climate change induced melting of permafrost halted their progress onward.

=== Writers-In-Residence ===
The first Writer-in-Residence was held by poet and author Hazel Buchan Cameron. During her tenure, she worked with young writers to produce creative writing pieces inspired by the RSGS collections. This culminated in an exhibition at Perth Museum in late 2014. The second recipient of the title was Jo Woolf who has brought the stories from RSGS history to life, most notably through the publication of her debut book, The Great Horizon. Published by Sandstone Press in 2017, this book features 50 inspiring stories from some of the most remarkable explorers, scientists and visionaries who have ever lived, all of whom have a connection to the Society. Woolf was awarded an Honorary Fellowship of the Society in 2018.

== Honorary Fellows ==
Honorary Fellowship, first awarded in 1888, is awarded in recognition of services to the Society and to the wider discipline of geography. Honorary Fellows may use the post-nominal designation FRSGS after their names.

- Adolphus Greely (1890)
- Adrien de Gerlache (1900)
- Albert I, Prince of Monaco (1891)
- Albrecht Penck (1899)
- Alick Buchanan-Smith (1974)
- Angus Buchanan (1924)
- Anne Glover (2014)
- Anne, Princess Royal (1990)
- Arthur Jephson (1890)
- Arthur Silva White (1892)
- Augustus Charles Gregory (1902)
- Aurel Stein (1910)
- Barbara Young (2012)
- Børge Ousland (2014)
- Boyd Alexander (1908)
- Cameron McNeish (2009)
- Carl Chun (1900)
- Carsten Borchgrevink (1901)
- Charles Cochrane-Baillie (1891)
- Charles Tupper (1894)
- Charles W. J. Withers (2010)
- Christopher Smout (2013)
- Clements Markham (1904)
- Craig Sams (2012)
- Crispin Tickell (1992)
- David Attenborough (2011)
- David E. Sugden (2011)
- David Hempleman-Adams (2012)
- David Shukman (2013)
- Don Cameron (2011)
- Doug Allan (2014)
- Doug Scott (2009)
- Ed Stafford (2011)
- Ernest Shackleton (1911)
- Ernst Georg Ravenstein (1889)
- Eugenius Warming (1909)
- Frederick Lugard (1892)
- Frederick Roberts (1893)
- Georges Lecointe (1900)
- Gilbert Hovey Grosvenor (1945)
- Greta Thunberg (2019)
- Gustav Hellmann (1909)
- Hamish Brown (2000)
- Hamish MacInnes (2007)
- Henry E. O'Neill (1889)
- Henry Ogg Forbes (1900)
- Henry Yule (1889)
- Hugh Alexander Webster (1888)
- Isabella Bird (1890)
- James Hunter (2001)
- Jason Lewis (2017)
- John Briggs (2001)
- John Christopher Bartholomew (1993)
- John Scott Keltie (1907)
- Karen Darke (2016)
- Kim Crosbie (2016)
- Laurence Pullar (1911)
- Leo Houlding (2014)
- Lewis Pugh (2011)
- Lord Charles Beresford (1899)
- Lord Foster (2011)
- Magnus Magnusson (1991)
- Mary Robinson (2012)
- Michael Palin (1993)
- Paul Vidal de La Blache (1909)
- Polly Higgins (2018)
- Ray Mears (2009)
- Robert H. Nelson (1890)
- Robert Laws (1900)
- Robert William Felkin (1898)
- Rory Stewart (2009)
- Rosie Swale-Pope (2011)
- Rune Gjeldnes (2010)
- Selina Hales (2019)
- Simon Pepper (2015)
- Sven Hedin (1902)
- Thomas Heazle Parke (1890)
- Tim Butcher (2013)
- Tom Weir (1992)
- Vanessa Lawrence (2014)
- William C. Dunbar (1890)
- William Grant Stairs (1890)
- William MacGregor (1890)
- William Mackinnon (1890)
- Yann Arthus-Bertrand (2009)
- Michael Portillo (2018)

== Presidents of the Royal Scottish Geographical Society ==
- 1885–1891: The Earl of Rosebery KG KT
- 1891–1894: The Duke of Argyll KG KT
- 1894–1898: The Marquess of Lothian KT
- 1898–1904: Sir John Murray KCB
- 1904–1910: James Geikie DCL LLD FRS
- 1910–1914: The Earl of Stair
- 1914–1916: The Duke of Buccleuch KT
- 1916–1919: The Lord Guthrie LLD
- 1919–1925: The Lord Salvesen PC
- 1925–1930: The Viscount Novar KT GCMG
- 1930–1934: The Lord Elphinstone KT
- 1934–1937: The Lord Polwarth CBE
- 1937–1942: The Earl of Rosebery KT
- 1942–1946: Sir D'Arcy Thomson Kt CB
- 1946–1950: Alan G. Ogilvie OBE
- 1950–1954: John Bartholomew MC JP FRSGS
- 1954–1958: Douglas Allan CBE LLD DSc PhD FRSE FRSGS
- 1958–1962: The Earl of Wemyss and March LLD DL
- 1962–1968: The Hon. Lord Cameron DSC MA LLB LLD DL
- 1968–1974: The Rt.Hon. Lord Balerno CBE TD MA DSc
- 1974–1977: Professor Ronald Miller MA PhD FRSE FRSGS
- 1977–1983: Professor James Wreford Watson MA PhD LLD FRSC FRSE FRSGS
- 1983–1987: The Viscount of Arbuthnott DSC MA FRSA FRICS
- 1987–1993: John C. Bartholomew MA FRSE FRGS
- 1993–1999: The Viscount Younger of Leckie KT KCVO TD DL
- 1999–2005: The Earl of Dalkeith KBE DL
- 2005–2012: The Earl of Lindsay
- 2012–present: Iain Stewart

== Medals and awards ==
The Society awards a number of medals for outstanding contributions to geography and exploration.

- Scottish Geographical Medal (Previously the RSGS Gold Medal)
- Livingstone Medal
- President's Medal
- Mungo Park Medal
- Coppock Research Medal
- Geddes Environment Medal
- Shackleton Medal
- W.S. Bruce Medal
- Joy Tivy Education Medal
- The Newbigin Prize
- Bartholomew Globe

Past Awards

- RSGS Bronze Medal

== See also ==
- Geography of Scotland
- History of science
- Learned societies
- List of British professional bodies
- List of Royal Societies
