= Joy Tivy =

Scottish geographer

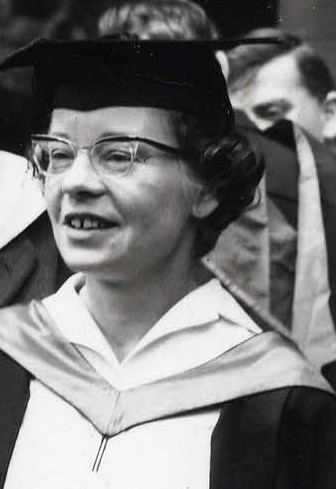

Joy Tivy FRSE FRSGS FIB (1924–1995) was a 20th century Irish physical geographer at the University of Glasgow. She specialised in biogeography and has been credited for having helped raise the profile of biogeography as a distinct sub-discipline of geography. She published over 40 papers, books and reports and she was often asked to advise government agencies and other organisations. She was a strong advocate of the importance of field studies for providing essential skills for geography graduates. Her capacity as a teacher was as highly regarded as her research — she was known to be enthusiastic and engaging to a wide range of audiences - a medal has been created by the Royal Scottish Geographical Society in honour of her commitment to Geographical Education and Teaching.

== Life ==
Joy Tivy was born in Carlow, Ireland on 24 August 1924.

She commenced studies at the University College Dublin in 1942 where she studied geography as her primary subject with botany and geology as her secondary areas. She excelled as an undergraduate most notably scoring highest in highly competitive exams in 1944, which granted her status as a Scholar. She graduated with first class honours in 1946 and after a brief period of teaching at the University of Leeds she accepted a position at the University of Edinburgh where she completed her doctorate. Her PhD thesis was entitled, A study of the effect of physical factors on the vegetation of hill grazings in selected areas of southern Scotland, p. 55. In 1956 she moved to the University of Glasgow where she stayed for the rest of her career (she retired in 1989). She was the second female to be awarded at professorship at the University of Glasgow in 1976 and was head of the Department of Geography and Topographic Science.

In 1984 she was elected a Fellow of the Royal Society of Edinburgh. Her proposers were John Lenihan, William Whigham Fletcher, Donald Michie, S. G. Checkland, Lord Cameron, and Wreford Watson. She was also elected a Fellow of the Institute of Biology (FIB).

Following retirement in 1984 she was elected a Fellow of the Royal Scottish Geographical Society (FRSGS).

She was actively involved in the Scottish Field Studies Association, with 10 years as chairperson and served as the editor of Scottish Geographical Magazine for a decade.

She died on 10 July 1995.

== Recognition ==
The RSGS established the Joy Tivy Education Medal in her honour, which is awarded annually "in recognition of an outstanding contribution to geographical education".

== Publications ==
These are some of her most notable books:

- Agricultural Ecology. Tivy, Joy. 1990. Longman Scientific and Technical.
- Biogeography: A Study of Plants in the Ecosphere. Tivy, Joy. 1993. Routledge.
- Human Impact on the Ecosystem (Conceptual frameworks in geography). Tivy, Joy. O'Hare, G. 1982. Oliver & Boyd.
- The Organic Resources of Scotland. Tivy, Joy. 1973. Edinburgh: Oliver and Boyd.
- The Glasgow region: a general survey. Eds. Ronald Miller and Joy Tivy. 1958. Edinburgh: T. & A. Constable.

She has 33 papers listed on ISI Web of Science.
