= Horrible Histories =

Children's educational entertainment franchise

Horrible Histories is an educational entertainment franchise encompassing many media including books, magazines, audio books, stage shows, TV shows, and more.

In 2013, Lisa Edwards, UK publishing and commercial director of Scholastic Corporation, described Horrible Histories as one of the company's "crown jewels", and said it is at an "advanced stage of evolution". She added: "We have covered every possible era that has a commercial outcome...We're now in the era of the box set, annuals, newly presented editions and licensed products".

== Books ==
=== Main series ===
Horrible Histories began as a book series by author Terry Deary. The series began in 1993 with The Terrible Tudors and The Awful Egyptians. The following titles continued the trend to describe British history through the context of the ruling dynasties, and explored significant worldwide cultures, often within the context of British history, such as the Viking and Roman conquests on the British Isles. A series of specials and novelty books have been released, and the last book was announced to be released in 2013.

=== Gory Stories ===
Fiction-type of Horrible Histories books were added to the series, called Gory Stories. The first set of these books were published in July 2008:

- Gory Stories – Tower of Terror (Terrible Tudors)
- Gory Stories – Tomb of Treasure (Awful Egyptians)
- Gory Stories – Wall of Woe (Rotten Romans)
- Gory Stories – Shadow of the Gallows (Vile Victorians)
- Gory Stories – Raiders and Ruins (Vicious Vikings) – March 2009
- Gory Stories – Blackout in the Blitz (Woeful Second World War) – May 2009
- Gory Stories – The Plague of Pain (aka Plague and Peril) (Measly Middle Ages) – 2009
- Gory Stories – The Trail of Treasure (aka Pirates and Plunder) (Putrid Pirates) – 2009
- Big Book of Gory Stories (Pack of Tomb of Treasure, Wall of Woe and Tower of Terror)

Blackout in the Blitz is listed on Terry Deary's website as Bombs on Britain. On Amazon.co.uk it is listed as Blackout in the Blitz, along with a cover.

- Grisly Quiz Book and Gruesome Games Pack.

== Film and television ==
=== 2000 TV series ===
From 2000 to 2001, Horrible Histories was adapted into an animated series consisting of 26 episodes. The premise revolves around kids Mo and Stitch's adventures through time and how they learned lessons that could be applied to their modern-day situations.

=== 2009 TV series ===
In 2009, a live-action series, styled as a sketch show, began airing on CBBC. It won many awards over its 5 series run, including some British Comedy Awards – the first children's show to do so.

=== With Stephen Fry ===
Horrible Histories with Stephen Fry was an edited version of the 2009 series, hosted by Stephen Fry instead of Rattus Rattus, broadcast in 2011. It was aimed at an adult audience.

=== 2015 TV series ===
In 2015, a A rebooted version of the 2009 sketch show began airing, retaining some members of the original cast in guest roles but with each episode focusing on a particular historical figure. Actors in Series 6 included Ben Miller, Rowan Atkinson, Kathryn Drysdale, Kevin Eldon, Simon Farnaby, Sarah Hadland, Lorna Watson, Jim Howick and Jessica Ransom. This series was directed by Simon Gibney and Ian Curtis. It won an International Emmy Kids Award in Cannes in April 2017 for the episode 'Crooked King John and Magna Carta’. Jessica Ransom won a Children's BAFTA for her performance as Mary Queen of Scots. Episodes continue to be produced.

=== Gory Games ===
Gory Games is a children's game show, and is a spin-off to the 2009 series. It is hosted by Rattus Rattus and Dave Lamb. Each episode has three contestants competing in challenges to collect Year Spheres.

=== Films ===
The writers and cast of the 2009 series were responsible for the 2015 family adventure comedy film Bill, a fictional imagining of what happened during the 'lost years' of William Shakespeare's life. Bill has no formal connection to the Horrible Histories franchise, but through its writers, performers, content and humour shows a number of similarities.

In 2019, the film Horrible Histories: The Movie – Rotten Romans, from a new cast and writing team, was released to positive reviews, though generally less favourable than those for Bill.

== Magazines ==
One of the first additions to the franchise was a series of magazines in 2003. A new magazine series was launched in 2012.

=== 2003 series ===
In late 2003 the Horrible Histories Magazine Collection began, a series of magazines based on Terry Deary's book series. They were published by Eaglemoss Publications, distributed by Cornag Magazine Marketing, printed by UK company Headley Bros, colour originated by Icon Reproductions, and released every fortnight. Some of the material was previously published in the Horrible Histories books on the same topics.

Originally planned to be 60, the series was continued with an additional 20. Items in each edition included Terrible Timelines, Wild 'n' Wicked cards, and royal family trees. The set came with tins to put the cards into, files to hold the timelines and trees, and boxes to hold the magazines. Here is a list of the 80 Issues of the magazine in the order in which they are received:

1. The Gory Glory of Rome – (Roman Empire)
2. The Terrible Tudors: Horrible Henry – (Tudor King Henry VIII)
3. The Awesome Egyptians: Mummy Mania – (Ancient Egyptian Mummies)
4. The Vile Victorians: Cruel Britannia – (Victorian Britannia)
5. The Measly Middle Ages – (Middle Ages)
6. The Slimy Stuarts: Bombs & Broomsticks – (Stuart and Guy Fawkes)
7. The Groovy Greeks: Hits 'n' Myths – (Greek Mythology)
8. The Frightful First World War – (World War I)
9. The Angry Aztecs – (Aztecs)
10. The Bizarre Tsars – (Russian Tsars)
11. The Vicious Vikings – (Vikings)
12. The Terrible Tudors: Misery Mary – (Tudor Queen Mary)
13. The Savage Stone Age – (Stone Age)
14. Rotten Romans on the Rampage – (The end of the Roman Republic)
15. The Awesome Egyptians: Fabulous Pharaohs – (Ancient Egyptian Pharaohs)
16. The Gorgeous Georgians: Heroes & Villains – (Georgian Policemen and Criminals)
17. The Vile Victorians: Crime & Punishment – (Victorian Crime and Punishment)
18. The Wicked Wild West – (Wild West)
19. The Frightfully Fabulous French – (France)
20. The Slimy Stuarts: Burning Boils – (Stuart Diseases)
21. The Woeful Second World War – (World War 2)
22. The Terrible Tudors: Bad Bess – (Tudor and Elizabethan Queen Elizabeth I of England)
23. The Extraordinary Explorers – (Explorers)
24. The Trendy 20s & The Dirty 30s – (Roaring Twenties in 1920s and Great Depression in 1930s)
25. America & its Scurvy Settlers – (America in 1600s and American Indians)
26. The Incredible Incas – (Incas)
27. The Smashing Saxons – (Saxons)
28. Rotten Romans in Britain – (The Roman conquest of Britain and Roman Britain)
29. The Vile Victorians: Foul Factories – (The Victorian Industrial Revolution)
30. The Groovy Greeks: Alexander the Not-So-Great – (Greek Alexander the Great)
31. The Slimy Stuarts: Charlie's Gets the Chop – (Stuart Charles I and the English Civil War)
32. The Marauding Mongols – (Mongols and Mongolia)
33. Rowdy Revolutions: France – (French Revolution)
34. The Awful Ancients – (Ancient Civilizations)
35. The Sizzling Spanish – (Spanish)
36. The Beastly Barbarians – (Barbarians)
37. The Stormin' Normans – (Normans)
38. Ruthless Richard & the Useless Yorks – (The Wars of the Roses)
39. The Blitzed Brits – (Britain's Blitz in the Second World War)
40. Rowdy Revolutions: America – (American Revolutionary War)
41. The Silly Chilly Cold War – (Cold War)
42. The Cut-Throat Celts – (Celts)
43. The Ingenious Italians – (Italian Renaissance)
44. Nasty Knights & Crazy Crusaders – (Knights and Crusaders)
45. The Gorgeous Georgians vs. Nasty Napoleon – (Napoleonic Wars)
46. The Slicing Samurai – (Japanese Samurai)
47. The 'Orrible Ottomans – (Ottoman Empire)
48. Plundering Pirates – (Pirates)
49. Rowdy Revolutions: Russia – (Russian Communist Revolution)
50. The Jumbled Germans – (Germany)
51. The Amazing Africans – (Africa)
52. The Incredible Indians – (India)
53. Revolting Rebellions: Europe – (European Revolutions for Republic)
54. The Cheeky Chinese – (Chinese)
55. America's Very Uncivil War – (US Civil War)
56. The Terrific Pacific – (Pacific Islands)
57. The Irate Irish – (Ireland)
58. Revolting Rebellions: South America – (South America)
59. Cruel Colonials – (British Colonies)
60. The Awesome Aussies – (Australian Colonists and Indigenous Australians)
61. The Scary Scots: Woad Warriors – (Scots and Picts)
62. Even More Rotten Romans – (Roman Empire and Emperors)
63. Awful England – (Pre-Norman England)
64. The Super South Africans -(South Africa)
65. The Shifty 50s – (The 50s).
66. Even More Extraordinary Explorers – (Explorers and The Age of Discovery)
67. The Amazing Americans – (Late 19th and early 20th century United States)
68. The Terrifying Trojans – (Trojans and City of Troy)
69. The Crazy Caribbean – (European Explorers, Colonists and Native Caribbeans)
70. Even More Vile Victorians – (Victorian Era)
71. The Wild Welsh – (Wales)
72. The Shocking 60s – (The 60s)
73. The Scary Scots: Tartan Terrors – (Pre-Act of Union Scotland)
74. The Busy Byzantines – (Byzantine Empire)
75. The Elegant Edwardians – (Edwardian Era)
76. Potty Portugal – (Portugal)
77. The Awesome North American Indians – (North American Indians and Indian Wars)
78. The Polar Brrrs – (The North and South Poles)
79. Awful England Again – (British Famous People)
80. Rotten Round-Up – (The Largest, Biggest and the Best)

Each issue came with small cards depicting historic people, places, events and customs as well as a collection of timelines. The first 60 issues came with timelines each showing an era of human history, while the later 20 had timelines showing the history of themes such as fashion, art and science. Some of the first 60 issues also had a royal family tree based on a certain period of history. The only exception of for Savage Stone Age, which instead had a comparison of all the ancient forms of man and what they ate.

There have also been three "special" magazines in the series:

- S1. Horrible Christmas
- S2. Cruel Crimes and Painful Punishments
- S3. Cruel Kings and Mean Queens – (English Monarchs)

The collection would not be relaunched in the UK in September 2009 due to low trial sales.

=== 2012 series ===
A monthly Horrible Histories magazine aimed at ages 7 to 10 was launched in the UK in October 2012, published by Immediate Media Company. A digital edition of the magazine was launched in 2013.

== Illustrations ==
Across the franchise, Horrible Histories is recognisable by the illustrations of Martin Brown, an Australian cartoonist/illustrator.

Regardless of what type of illustration is required, Brown's first step is to read the accompanying text. With Horrible Histories colleague Terry Deary, his task as a cartoonist is to inject humour into the books. He bounced ideas back and forth, "either coming up with gags to suit the text or interpreting Terry's instructions for best comic or dramatic effect". The third stage is working out how "angles, scale, aspect, style, pace etc" will be considered in the design space.

After that he draws the roughs and the finished drawing. The roughs are first sent to the publishers who make their comments, and then they are sent to Deary. Tweaks are done in the rough stage. In the case of full colours books, the last stage is adding colour. He does it via ink and water-colour, or "the line-work is scanned and sent to a colourist who adds the colour on computer".

== Theatre ==
Some of Terry Deary's books have been adapted into plays. The children's theatre company Birmingham Stage Company Productions have the license to present Horrible Histories on stage around the world. They use the "bogglevision" 3D effects.

- Horrible Histories: The Mad Millennium (1999)
- Horrible Histories: Terrible Tudors (2005)
- Horrible Histories: Vile Victorians (2005)
- Horrible Histories: Awful Egyptians (2007)
- Horrible Histories: Ruthless Romans (2007)
- Horrible Histories: Nottingham (2008)
- Horrible Histories: Frightful First World War (2009)
- Horrible Histories: Blitzed Brits (2009)
- Horrible Histories: Barmy Britain (2012)
- Horrible Histories: Horrible Christmas (2013)
- Horrible Histories: Groovy Greeks (2015)
- Horrible Histories: Incredible Invaders (2015)
- Horrible Histories: Wicked Warwick (2015)

== Exhibitions ==
- Horrible Histories: Funfair of Fear (2000), described as an example of the "trivialisation" of history.
- The Horrible Histories: Crime and Punishment exhibition was held at the Royal Armouries Museum in Leeds between July and November in 2007. It broke attendance records.
- Horrible Histories: Frightful First World War (2008)
- Horrible Histories: Terrible Trenches (2009)
- Horrible Histories: Spies (2013)
- Horrible Histories: Rotten Rationing Big Picture Show (2013)
- Plague, Poverty and Prayer: A Horrid History with Terry Deary (2013)

== Prom ==
Horrible Histories Prom was a 2011 concert showcasing the original songs of the 2009 TV series, interspersed with classical music. It was performed in the Royal Albert Hall in London as part of the BBC's annual Proms series of concerts. An edited version of the prom was televised as a special episode of the 2009 CBBC TV series entitled Horrible Histories Big Prom Party.

== Audio tapes/CDs ==
In 2003 and 2004, BBC Worldwide released 10 CDs of Audio tape/CD dramatizations of books from the Horrible Histories series, starring Terry Deary. Horrible Histories teamed up with Kellogg's. All of the CDs are read by Terry Deary and were available inside some Kellogg's cereals. The books contained material from the original books, as well as original material. In addition, the Daily Telegraph and Sunday Telegraph gave away four free audiobooks over a two-week period in October 2006.

- The Savage Stone Age
- The Groovy Greeks
- The Rotten Romans
- The Vicious Vikings
- The Stormin' Normans
- The Measly Middle Ages
- The Terrible Tudors
- The Vile Victorians
- The Frightful First World War
- The Woeful Second World War

Between 8 and 14 September 2007, the Daily Telegraph and Sunday Telegraph gave away 7 new Horrible Histories audiobooks, again read by Terry Deary and adapted from his books. They were:

- The Villainous Victorians
- The Savage Stone Age
- The Angry Aztecs
- The Incredible Incas
- The Cut Throat Celts
- The Groovy Greeks
- The Barmy British Empire

=== Reception ===
The response has been generally positive:

Terry Deary and Martin Brown's brilliant books about the nastiest periods in history have now—with the help of some astounding actors—been transformed into a series of audio extravaganzas. Featuring new, extra material not found anywhere in the books, these sound spectaculars are just as thrilling and spilling, funny and fast as their printed counterparts. Horrible Histories are guaranteed to bring you history with the nasty bits left in! The Rotten Romans features beastly battles, deadly doctoring and marvellous myths—and you can even find out how to tell the future using a dead chicken! It's packed with quizzes, sketches, music and jokes, as well as mini-dramas and real life re-enactments—telling you the kind of foul facts which just aren't available from a classroom education!

== Games and toys ==
=== Virtual world ===
Scholastic went into partnership with agency Yomego to create an online world using the HuzuVirtual virtual world framework from software company HuzuTech. Visitors to the virtual world will be able to create an avatar dressed in historical costume, explore, look in a virtual world shop, chat, and subscribe to events where the children may meet the author, Terry Deary. The idea is that users will be able to explore areas with names like "Rotten Rome", "Awesome Egypt", and "Terrible Tudor London".

The virtual world went live in August 2011.

=== Battle Arena ===
In 2013, an action figure battle toy was released. A YouTube channel releasing videos explaining battle techniques and strategies was set up. A series of Horrible Histories toys have been released. One of the main ones, released in 2013, is the Battle Arena, which features action figures based on the book illustrations by Martin Brown.

=== Video game ===
In 2009, a video game based on the books Rotten Romans and Ruthless Romans, entitled Horrible Histories: Ruthless Romans, a video game based on the book, was released in 2009. It received "generally unfavorable" reviews according to review aggregator Metacritic.

=== Sophisticated Games board games ===
Sophisticated Games has the board game license for Horrible Histories board games. A board game edition of the Rotten Roman book and videogame was released in 2008. Terry Deary and Mike Siggins are the designers, the artwork was done by Martin Brown and Dave Smith, and the text was by Simon Breed. The game was published by Sophisticated Games. The game is for 2-4 players and is of the "roll and move" genre. Awful Egyptians was published in 2013.

=== Brainbox board games ===
There are a Brainbox series of Horrible Histories board games. They are quiz-based games, which involve the answering of questions on the back of cards. The series includes Awful Ancients and Vile Villains. It was reviewed at The Dice Tower.

=== Fancy dress costumes ===
In 2014, a range of Horrible Histories costumes was released in partnership with Smiffy's.

== Horrible Histories Interactive ==
Horrible Histories Interactive is an online experience for children, available via the CBBC website or by the Red Button platform. The content, which was designed and developed by Red Bee Media, was commissioned by Horrible Histories to work in tandem with the 2009 CBBC TV series. The online experience includes 12 exclusive Behind the Scenes clips, sing-along versions of the show's songs, and the online gaming experiences: Terrible Treasures, Time Sewer Adventures, and AD/BC Time Tour.

The aim of the multi-platform promotion was to shift perceptions about the series and to increase online participation. A beauty spoof campaign was devised, promos were run on BBC, countdown web banners were created, and an interactive promo for the site ran during the trailers for ahead of Shrek Forever. An interactive spoof talent show campaign was also launched, in which various historical characters vied for the title "Horrible Hero". Horrible Histories Interactive's work led to an increase of unique users to the Horrible Histories microsite, and an increase in the percentage of people who associated Horrible Histories with the CBBC.

Terrible Treasures is a point-and-click computer game available for free on the CBBC website. It was co-produced by Littleloud Studios, and written and co-directed by Will Jewell. The premise, which involves some of the same writers and actors as the TV series, involves Rattus Rattus recovering pieces of map from the Time Sewers in order to find treasure. Since being launched in August 2009, it became the top rated game for CBBC. There were various internet reminder from Rattus Rattus about the Horrible Histories 'Terrible Treasures' game at the end of each episode (starting in series 2).

Jim Hall worked on Time Sewer Adventures and AD/BC Time Tour. Regarding the latter project, LionTV said "For season four [we] wanted to create an experience based on the hugely popular songs." OverDigital described AD/BC Time Tour as "A very fun game with obvious similarities to Guitar Hero. It takes advantage of Stage3D in an appealing and engaging live music stage environment. What is amazing though is the combination of actually really fun music with an increasing level of difficulty, and simple, but fun action."

Year	Award	Title	Recipient	Result
2010	British Interactive Media Association Award	Best Game	Horrible Histories: Terrible Treasures	Nominated
2010	PromaxBDA Award	Best Interactive Marketing	Red Bee Media	Nominated
2010	PromaxBDA Award	Best Viral, Widget or Application	Red Bee Media	Nominated
2011	Digital Broadcast Award	Best use of Interactive	Horrible Histories: Terrible Treasures	Won
2011	History Makers Award	Best Interactive Production	Horrible Histories Interactive	Won
2011	Promax UK Award	Best Children's Promo (Originated)	Red Bee Media	Won (Gold)
2011	Promax UK Award	Best Use of Direction	Red Bee Media	Won (Gold)
2011	Promax UK Award	Most Effective TV Promo Campaign	Red Bee Media	Won (Gold)
2012	Eurovision Showcase Award	Best Children's or Young Peoples' Promotion	Horrible Histories	Nominated (Silver)
2012	Promaxbda Europe Award	Best Integrated Marketing Campaign	Red Bee Media	Nominated

== Theme park ==
In March 2003, author Terry Deary stated that he had plans for a £130 million theme park "...on an enormous scale, something that will really put this region on the map the way Disney World has done for Florida." Terry Deary's History Experience was to be built on South Tyneside, close to where Deary was born. These original plans fell through, but new talks are underway about a second proposal, based in County Durham, which would include the Horrible Histories name.

Terry Deary said of The Terry Deary History Experience Park: "What I hope to build is a History Experience where I recreate authentic villages from various periods — Tudor, Roman, Victorian perhaps — with nothing of the 20th century in them...They'll be enclosed in domes like the Eden Project in Cornwall so they'll be all-weather attractions and they will not be museums or theme parks; they will be peopled by actors and the visitors can join in the never-ending re-enactments of the past — with all its horrible history flavour — over there is a pickpocket on trial for stealing ... is he guilty, do we hang him? You, the visitor, must decide."

He wanted the audience to be fully immersed into the culture of the period, "Over there is Mr Shakespeare rehearsing a play and having trouble with the Puritans ... over here are the preparations for Queen Elizabeth's visit...in that house is a craftsman turning wooden bowls, and in that one a woman selling roast thrushes to take away while there is a house being built using genuine tools and skills and over there a Tudor ship. When the ship is completed it will sail on the river and a new one built — when we have two we'll have a sea battle!". The proposed park, to be set up in South Tyneside, was a £130m project. "The original plans included an all-weather attraction where recreated villages from the Roman times to Tudor and Victorian England, were to be encased in domes similar to the Eden Project in Cornwall."

In 2016, a Horrible Histories maze opened at Warwick Castle. It is an interactive hedge maze featuring zones based on various historical time periods. Activity at Warwick Castle also included interactive exhibitions and a bespoke theater production ‘Wicked Warwick’.
