= Terry Deary =

British children's author (born 1946)

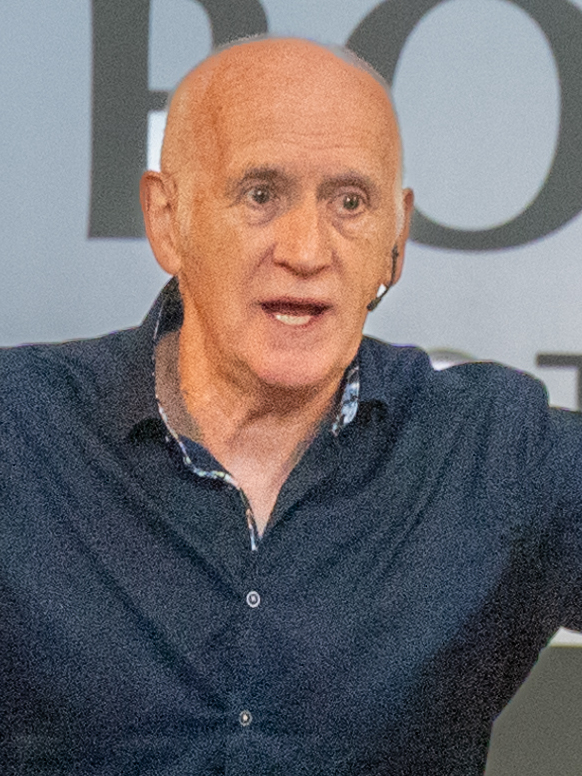
- Deary at the 2024 Chiswick Book Festival
- Born: 3 January 1946 (age 80); Sunderland, Tyne and Wear, England
- Occupation: Author

William Terence Deary (born 3 January 1946) is a British children's author of 351 books, selling over 38 million copies in over 45 languages, best known as the writer of the Horrible Histories series. Since 1994 he has been one of Britain's best-selling authors. In 2012, he was the tenth most-borrowed author in British libraries, and was voted Outstanding Children's Non-Fiction Author of the 20th Century by Books for Keeps magazine.

== Life and career ==
Deary was born in Sunderland. His father Bill owned a butcher's shop in Hendon, a poverty-stricken area of the city, and his mother Freda was the manager of a clothing shop. Deary went to Monkwearmouth Grammar School and intensely disliked his school experience, particularly the style of teaching he received.

He worked as a butcher's boy for much of his childhood, helping in the shop from the age of three. He joined the electricity board as a management trainee when he was 18 and later the Theatre Powys drama company in 1972 and as an actor toured Welsh village halls bringing theatre to children.

He qualified as a teacher at the Sunderland's College of Education and taught drama. He was the Theatre Director/County Drama Advisor of the Lowestoft Theatre Centre in Suffolk between 1975 and 1977 – an educationally linked organisation funded by Suffolk Country Council. He began writing in 1976, turning full-time in 1994, with the publication of the Horrible Histories series.

The Horrible Histories series of books are popular among children for their interesting details, vast information and humorous pictures and among adults for getting children interested in history. Books in the series have been widely translated into other languages and imitated. A cartoon series has been made of the series of books and was shown on CITV in 2002. The Horrible Histories live action comedy sketch show of the same name has been shown on CBBC since 2009. Deary himself has made irregular appearances on the show.

Deary received an Honorary Doctorate of Education from the University of Sunderland in 2000. He supports Sunderland AFC.

In 2011, he retired from writing children's books after 35 years. He lives in Burnhope, County Durham, England with his wife, Jenny, and their daughter, Sara.

It was announced in 2024 that Constable had won the rights to Deary's first foray into crime fiction, Actually, I'm a Murderer following a four-way auction.

== Views on education ==
Deary is an outspoken critic of schools, which he believes serve no function above keeping children off the street.

Deary commented in 2003: "I've no interest in schools. They have no relevance in the 21st century. They were a Victorian idea to get kids off the street. Who decided that putting 30 kids with only their age in common in a classroom with one teacher was the best way of educating? At my school there were 52 kids in the class and all I learned was how to pass the 11-plus. Testing is the death of education. Kids should leave school at 11 and go to work. Not down the mines or up chimneys, mind, but working with computers or something relevant. Everything I learned after 11 was a waste of time. Trigonometry, Boyle's law: it's never been of any use to me. They should have been teaching me the life skills I was going to need, such as building relationships, parenting and managing money. I didn't have a clue about any of these things at 18. Schools need to change." Deary also called to "ban Horrible Histories from schools" in 2012, because "classrooms take all the fun out of his stories".

In 2013, Deary spoke out against public libraries, saying that they "have been around too long", are "no longer relevant" and have "had their day," and derided the Public Lending Right remuneration to authors for library loans. He argued: "We've got this idea that we've got an entitlement to read books for free, at the expense of authors, publishers and council tax payers... We don't expect to go to a food library to be fed. The car industry would collapse if we went to car libraries for free use of Porsches... If I sold the book I'd get 30p per book. I get six grand, [when] I should be getting £180,000."

== Selected books ==
=== Series ===
- Horrible History series
- Truly Terrible Tales
- Master Crook's Crime Academy
- Tudor Chronicles (also known as Tudor Terror)
- Tudor Tales
- Roman Tales
- Egyptian Tales
- The Fire Thief
- The Knowledge
- Pirate Tales
- True Stories
  - True Monster Stories
- Time Detectives
- The Spark Files
- World War I Tales
- World War II Tales

=== Other books ===
- A Witch in Time
- The Ape Escape
- Classified
- Dangerous Days
- The Ghosts Of Batwing Castle (1988)
- All about Bede: the life and times of the Venerable Bede, 672 – 735 AD (1996)
- Spooks (1997)
- Hat Trick
- Hope Street (1980); ISBN 0-304-30514-6
- Ghost For Sale (2001)
- The Treasure of Crazy Horse (2001)
- The Custard Kid (2001)
- The Wishing Well Ghost (2002)
- Into The Lion's Den (2002)
- Footsteps in the Fog (2003)
- The Boy Who Haunted Himself (2004)
- The Last Viking (2005)
- Great big Father Christmas joke book
- The Vampire of Croglin
- Diary of a murder
- Thirteen Terrifying Tales (2024)
- A History of Britain in Ten Enemies (2024)
- Actually, I'm A Murderer (2025)
