= Deaths in September 2019 =

The following is a list of notable deaths in September 2019.

Entries for each day are listed alphabetically by surname. A typical entry lists information in the following sequence:

- Name, age, country of citizenship at birth, subsequent country of citizenship (if applicable), reason for notability, cause of death (if known), and reference.

== September 2019 ==
=== 1 ===
- George Abe, 82, Japanese manga artist (Rainbow: Nisha Rokubō no Shichinin), pneumonia.
- Kenneth Baugh, 78, Jamaican politician, MP and Leader of the Opposition (2005).
- Alison Cheek, 92, Australian-born American Episcopal priest.
- Charles W. Daniels, 76, American judge, justice of the New Mexico Supreme Court (2007–2018).
- Jacob Gelt Dekker, 71, Dutch businessman, writer and philanthropist, lymphoma.
- Radomil Eliška, 88, Czech conductor.
- Albert Fritz, 72, German racing cyclist.
- Alberto Goldman, 81, Brazilian politician, MP (1979–2006), Minister of Transport (1992–1993) and Governor of São Paulo (2010–2011), cancer.
- Adiss Harmandian, 74, Lebanese-Armenian pop singer, cancer.
- Gagik Hovunts, 89, Armenian composer.
- Astrid Hanzalek, 91, American politician, member of the Connecticut House of Representatives (1971–1981).
- Kari Lehtola, 80, Finnish lawyer, head of the Safety Investigation Authority (1996–2001).
- Nikon Liolin, 73, American Eastern Orthodox prelate, Archbishop of the Albanian Archdiocese (since 2003) and New England (since 2005).
- Katherine MacLean, 94, American science fiction author.
- Ciaran McKeown, 76, Northern Irish peace activist.
- Janet L. Mitchell, 69, American physician, complications from Alzheimer's disease.
- Barbara Probst Solomon, 90, American author.
- Joana Sainz García, 30, Spanish dancer and choreographer, injuries sustained in pyrotechnic explosion.
- Jean Edward Smith, 86, American biographer.
- Jukka Virtanen, 86, Finnish director, actor and screenwriter (Levyraati, Pähkähullu Suomi, Noin seitsemän veljestä), cancer.

=== 2 ===
- Isabel Keith Baker, 90, American educator.
- Michael Beddow, 72, British academic.
- Rémi Bouchard, 83, Canadian composer and educator.
- Rea Brändle, 66, Swiss journalist.
- Jack Clay, 92, American acting teacher, cancer.
- William G. Daughtridge Jr., 86, American politician.
- Atli Eðvaldsson, 62, Icelandic football player (Borussia Dortmund, Fortuna Düsseldorf, national team) and manager, cancer.
- Carlo Fonseka, 86, Sri Lankan physician, President of the Medical Council (2012–2017).
- Dorothea Benton Frank, 67, American author, myelodysplastic syndrome.
- Jose Garcia Cosme, 62, Puerto Rican convicted drug dealer, shot.
- Andrea Gemma, 88, Italian Roman Catholic prelate, Bishop of Isernia-Venafro (1990–2006).
- Gordie Haworth, 87, Canadian ice hockey player (New York Rangers).
- Sergei Kirpichenko, 68, Russian diplomat, Ambassador to Egypt (since 2011).
- Gyoji Matsumoto, 85, Japanese footballer (national team), heart disease.
- Kevin Percy, 84, New Zealand Olympic hockey player (1960).
- Rainer Pethran, 68, German Olympic basketball player (1972).
- Frederic Pryor, 86, American economist.
- Helmut Rauch, 80, Austrian nuclear physicist.
- Lee Salem, 73, American comic strip editor (Calvin and Hobbes, For Better or For Worse, The Boondocks), stroke.
- Joan Antoni Solans Huguet, 77, Spanish urban planner, traffic collision.
- Jan Storms, 93, Belgian racing cyclist.
- Mieczysław Tracz, 56, Polish Olympic wrestler (1988).

=== 3 ===
- Athanase Bala, 92, Cameroonian Roman Catholic prelate, Bishop of Bafia (1977–2003).
- Cassie Deveaux Cohoon, 84, Canadian writer.
- Henry Crapo, 87, American mathematician.
- LaShawn Daniels, 41, American songwriter ("Say My Name", "Love and War"), Grammy winner (2000), traffic collision.
- Diet Eman, 99, Dutch Resistance fighter and writer.
- David Evans, 94, Australian politician, MLA (1968–1989).
- Wendell Foster, 95, American politician, member of the New York City Council (1978–2001).
- Halvard Hanevold, 49, Norwegian biathlete, Olympic champion (1998, 2002, 2010).
- George Klopfer, 79, American physician.
- Hope Landrine, 65, American psychologist.
- Peter Lindbergh, 74, German fashion photographer (Stern, Vogue, Rolling Stone) and film director.
- Carol Lynley, 77, American actress (Harlow, Bunny Lake Is Missing, The Poseidon Adventure), heart attack.
- Pierre Nadeau, 82, Canadian journalist and television presenter (Radio-Canada), complications from Parkinson's disease.
- José de Jesús Pimiento Rodríguez, 100, Colombian Roman Catholic cardinal, Archbishop of Manizales (1975–1996), heart attack.
- Rita Steblin, 68, Canadian musicologist.
- Tony Thiessen, 77, Australian footballer (Melbourne, Carlton, North Melbourne).

=== 4 ===
- Edgardo Andrada, 80, Argentine footballer (Rosario Central, Vasco, national team).
- James Atlas, 70, American publisher (Penguin Books), complications from a lung condition.
- Sir Hugh Beach, 96, British general, Master-General of the Ordnance (1977–1981).
- Pál Berendy, 86, Hungarian footballer (Vasas SC, national team).
- Charles Broad, 73, English-born New Zealand cricketer.
- Gerardo Bujanda Sarasola, 100, Spanish Civil War veteran and Basque nationalist politician, Deputy (1977–1982).
- Kottakkal Chandrasekharan, 74, Indian Kathakali dancer.
- Dai Tielang, 88, Chinese animator (Black Cat Detective, A Deer of Nine Colors, Little Tadpoles Looking for Mama).
- Patrick Dehornoy, 66, French mathematician, discoverer of Dehornoy order.
- Peter Ellis, 61, New Zealand convicted child sex abuser and injustice claimant, bladder cancer.
- Roger Etchegaray, 96, French Roman Catholic cardinal, Auxiliary Bishop of Paris (1969–1970), Archbishop of Marseille (1970–1985) and President of PCCU (1984–1995).
- Henrietta Garnett, 74, English writer.
- Kylie Rae Harris, 30, American country singer, traffic collision.
- R. Ian Jack, 84, Scottish-born Australian historian.
- Jamie Janson, 43, British aid worker and militant, suicide.
- Tevfik Kış, 85, Turkish wrestler, Olympic champion (1960).
- Stuart B. Levy, 80, American microbiologist.
- Kenny Mitchell, 62, English footballer (Newcastle United).
- Abdullah Morsi, 25, Egyptian presidential son.
- Desmond Morton, 81, Canadian historian.
- Brendan O'Donoghue, 76, Irish civil servant.
- Felipe Ruvalcaba, 78, Mexican footballer (1964 Olympics, CD Oro, national team).
- Timothy Seow, 81, Singaporean architect, pancreatic cancer.
- Konstantin Simun, 85, Russian sculptor.
- S. Sriram, Indian film producer (Thiruda Thiruda, Bombay, Aasai), cardiac arrest.
- Tsem Tulku Rinpoche, 53, Taiwanese-born Malaysian Tibetan tulku, liver failure.
- Dan Warner, 49, American Grammy Award winning musician (Julio Iglesias, Alejandro Sanz, Calle 13), heart attack.

=== 5 ===
- Abid Ali, 67, Pakistani actor (Waris, Seerat) and director (Dasht), liver failure.
- Jack W. Carter, 81, American politician.
- Charlie Cole, 64, American photojournalist, World Press Photo of the Year winner (1989), sepsis.
- Rod Coneybeare, 89, Canadian puppeteer and voice actor (The Friendly Giant).
- Waldron Fox-Decent, 83, Canadian political scientist.
- Ji Guobiao, 87, Chinese chemical engineer, member of the Chinese Academy of Engineering, laryngeal cancer.
- Alberto Jara Franzoy, 90, Chilean Roman Catholic prelate, Bishop of Chillán (1982–2006).
- Jimmy Johnson, 76, American musician (Muscle Shoals Rhythm Section) and record producer.
- Akitsugu Konno, 75, Japanese ski jumper, Olympic silver medallist (1972).
- Liu Xu, 80, Chinese pharmaceutical chemist, discovered artesunate.
- Chris March, 56, American fashion designer (Beach Blanket Babylon), heart attack.
- Kiran Nagarkar, 77, Indian novelist (Cuckold), cerebral hemorrhage.
- Denis Nsanzamahoro, Rwandan actor (100 Days, Sometimes in April) and film director, complications from diabetes.
- Glenn Pendlay, 48, American weightlifting coach, cancer.
- Tom Phoebus, 77, American baseball player (Baltimore Orioles).
- Andrzej Polkowski, 80, Polish translator.
- Cardy Raper, 94, American mycologist and writer.
- Mary Rini, 94, American baseball player (Kenosha Comets, Muskegon Lassies).
- Parvez Rob, 56, Bangladeshi music director and composer, traffic collision.
- Bob Rule, 75, American basketball player (Seattle SuperSonics, Philadelphia 76ers, Cleveland Cavaliers).
- Francisco Toledo, 79, Mexican expressionist artist.
- Jaroslav Weigel, 88, Czech actor (Empties, Waiter, Scarper!) and comics artist (Lips Tullian).
- Wally Westlake, 98, American baseball player (Pittsburgh Pirates, St. Louis Cardinals, Cleveland Indians).

=== 6 ===
- Chng Seok Tin, 73, Singaporean multi-media artist, lung cancer.
- Bob Church, 82, Canadian geneticist.
- Chris Duncan, 38, American baseball player (St. Louis Cardinals), World Series champion (2006), glioblastoma.
- Michael Fedechko, 82, Canadian bishop.
- Chandrasiri Gajadeera, 73, Sri Lankan politician, MP (1994–2001, since 2004).
- Susan Irvine, 91, Australian educator, author and rose authority.
- Sukhdev Singh Libra, 86, Indian politician, MP (1998–2014).
- Leonard W. Moore, 85, American chief executive.
- José Moreno, 61, Dominican baseball player (New York Mets, San Diego Padres), pulmonary failure.
- Robert Mugabe, 95, Zimbabwean revolutionary and politician, President (1987–2017) and Prime Minister (1980–1987), cancer.
- Abdul Qadir, 63, Pakistani cricketer (national team), heart attack.
- Terry Sendgraff, 85, American dancer and choreographer.
- Norah Sharpe Stone, 81, Canadian-born American philanthropist and vintner, cancer.
- Chester Williams, 49, South African rugby union player (Western Province, national team) and coach (Blitzboks), heart attack.

=== 7 ===
- Robert Axelrod, 70, American actor (Mighty Morphin Power Rangers, The Blob, Digimon).
- Richard Ball, 87, American politician.
- George J. Berry, 82, American businessman.
- Roger Boutry, 87, French composer and conductor, music director of the Republican Guard (1973–1977).
- C. Loring Brace, 88, American anthropologist.
- Al Carmichael, 90, American football player (Green Bay Packers, Denver Broncos) and stuntman (Spartacus).
- Alberto Cerreti, 80, Italian politician, President of the Province of Grosseto (1985–1990).
- Naiyyum Choudhury, 72, Bangladeshi biochemist.
- Irvin M. Cohen, 97, American psychiatrist.
- Alfredo Córdoba, 94, Mexican Olympic footballer (1948).
- Lawrie Creamer, 81, New Zealand protein chemist (Fonterra).
- Terry Horne, 65, New Zealand cricketer (Central Districts).
- Veeru Krishnan, Indian film actor (Akele Hum Akele Tum, Raja Hindustani, Ishq).
- Volodymyr Luciv, 90, Ukrainian bandurist and tenor.
- Mongsen Ching Monsin, 58, Bangladeshi journalist, researcher and writer.
- Peter Nichols, 92, British playwright (A Day in the Death of Joe Egg, Passion Play, Poppy).
- James Robertson, 81, American judge, United States District Court for the District of Columbia (1994–2008), cardiovascular disease.
- Charlie Silvera, 94, American baseball player (New York Yankees).
- Guy Travaglio, 93, American politician, member of the Pennsylvania House of Representatives (1995–2004).
- Peter van Dijk, 90, American architect (Blossom Music Center, Anthony J. Celebrezze Federal Building).
- John Wesley, 72, American actor (Stop! Or My Mom Will Shoot, Superhuman Samurai Syber-Squad, Hang 'Em High), multiple myeloma.
- Wu Minsheng, 73, Chinese mechanical engineer and academic, President of Fuzhou University (2002–2010).

=== 8 ===
- Tufail Abbas, 91, Pakistani trade unionist.
- Shlomo Bar-Shavit, 90, Israeli actor and theatre director, pneumonia.
- Marjorie Blamey, 101, British illustrator.
- Marca Bristo, 66, American disability rights activist, cancer.
- Alfred A. Cave, 84, American historian and author.
- Henri de Contenson, 93, French archaeologist.
- Sir Christopher Dobson, 69, British chemist, Master of St John's College, Cambridge (since 2007), pancreatic cancer.
- Timur Eneev, 94, Russian mathematician.
- David Hagberg, 76, American novelist.
- Jerry Haldi, 84, Israeli football player (Hapoel Petah Tikva, national team) and manager (Hakoah Sydney).
- Adelaine Hain, 82, South African anti-apartheid activist.
- Arnold R. Highfield, 79, American historian.
- Roger Hsieh, 85, Taiwanese politician, member of the Legislative Yuan (1993–1999).
- Ram Jethmalani, 95, Indian lawyer and politician, MP (1977–1984, since 2010) and Minister of Law and Justice (1996, 1999–2000).
- James Johnson, 62, American wrestler and coach.
- Susan Kamil, 69, American journalist, editor-in-chief of Random House (since 2008), lung cancer.
- Ibrahima Kébé, 64, Senegalese painter, complications from diabetes.
- Yisrael Kessar, 88, Israeli politician, member of the Knesset (1984–1995).
- Joseph P. Kolter, 93, American politician, member of the House of Representatives (1983–1993).
- Lito Legaspi, 77, Filipino actor (Sinong Kapiling? Sinong Kasiping?, Pugoy Hostage: Davao, The Good Daughter), cardiac arrest.
- Paul Lyons, 50, Australian Olympic taekwondo practitioner (1992, 2000).
- Jane Mead, 61, American poet, cancer.
- Yusuf Motala, 72, Indian Islamic scholar, heart attack.
- Christopher James, 5th Baron Northbourne, 93, British aristocrat, member of the House of Lords (1982–2018).
- S. Rajasekar, 62, Indian actor (Saravanan Meenatchi) and director.
- Marina Schiano, 77, Italian fashion model and journalist, complications from kidney cancer surgery.
- Camilo Sesto, 72, Spanish singer-songwriter ("Algo Más", "Amor Mío, ¿Qué Me Has Hecho?"), heart failure.
- Olav Skjevesland, 77, Norwegian Lutheran prelate, Bishop of Agder og Telemark (1998–2012).
- Carlos Squeo, 71, Argentine footballer (Racing Club, Boca Juniors, national team).

=== 9 ===
- Jim Archer, 87, American baseball player (Kansas City Athletics).
- Neiron Ball, 27, American football player (Oakland Raiders), arteriovenous malformation.
- Brian Barnes, 74, Scottish golfer, cancer.
- Robert Frank, 94, Swiss-American photographer (The Americans) and documentary filmmaker (Cocksucker Blues).
- Danny Frawley, 56, Australian football player (St Kilda, Victoria) and coach (Richmond), traffic collision.
- Clifton L. Ganus Jr., 97, American theologian.
- Dulce García, 54, Cuban Olympic javelin thrower (1992), heart attack.
- Jim Greengrass, 91, American baseball player (Cincinnati Reds/Redlegs, Philadelphia Phillies).
- Lissy Gröner, 65, German politician, MEP (1989–2009).
- Gru, 46, Serbian rapper ("Da li imaš pravo?", "Biću tu", "I dalje me žele"), paragliding accident.
- Fred Herzog, 88, Canadian photographer.
- Joe Keough, 73, American baseball player (Oakland Athletics, Kansas City Royals, Chicago White Sox).
- Sahar Khodayari, 29, Iranian football fan and activist, self-immolation.
- Kim Seong-hwan, 86, South Korean cartoonist.
- Robert S. Lancaster, 61, American computer programmer and skeptical activist.
- Lavrentis Machairitsas, 62, Greek rock musician, heart attack.
- Joe McGhie, 72, Australian rules footballer (Footscray).
- Fred McLeod, 67, American sportscaster (Cleveland Cavaliers, Detroit Pistons).
- Jarzinho Pieter, 31, Curaçaoan footballer (Centro Dominguito, national team), heart attack.
- Michael Shenstone, 91, Canadian diplomat.
- Toshihiro Takami, 91, Japanese Christian pastor.
- Alister Taylor, 75, New Zealand publisher.
- Derek Varnals, 84, South African cricketer (Eastern Province, Natal, national team).
- Gordon Willden, 89, Canadian politician.
- Jarrid Wilson, 30, American pastor and writer, suicide.

=== 10 ===
- Ahsan Ali, 82, Bangladeshi physician.
- David McCurdy Baird, 99, Canadian geologist, photographer and academic.
- Elmer Close, 82, American politician.
- Hal Colebatch, 73, Australian author.
- Betty Corwin, 98, American theatre archivist, founder of Theatre on Film and Tape Archive.
- David Criswell, 78, American planetary scientist.
- Sam Davis, 75, American football player (Pittsburgh Steelers).
- Stefano Delle Chiaie, 82, Italian neofascist activist, founder of the National Vanguard.
- Yuval Elizur, 92, Israeli economic journalist.
- Jeff Fenholt, 68, American musician (Bible Black, Geezer Butler Band), actor (Jesus Christ Superstar) and television evangelist.
- John Gordon Harris, 71, Canadian police officer.
- Ariel Hollinshead, 90, American pharmacologist.
- Nodar Khaduri, 49, Georgian politician, Minister of Finance (2012–2016), heart disease.
- Li Ping, 95, Chinese geologist and earthquake engineer, member of the Chinese Academy of Engineering.
- Branislav Lončar, 81, Serbian Olympic sport shooter (1960, 1968).
- Salvatore Mannuzzu, 89, Italian writer and politician, Deputy (1976–1987), heart attack.
- Robert N. McClelland, 89, American surgeon (operated on President John Fitzgerald Kennedy and Lee Harvey Oswald), renal failure.
- Valerie Van Ost, 75, English actress (Carry On, The Beauty Jungle, Mister Ten Per Cent), liver cancer.
- Hossam Ramzy, 65, Egyptian percussionist and composer.
- Albert Razin, 79, Russian language activist, self-immolation.
- Jai Krishan Sharma, 76, Indian politician, President of Himachal Pradesh Bharatiya Janata Party (2000–2003), MLA (1998–2003).
- Billy Stacy, 83, American football player (Chicago Cardinals/St. Louis Cardinals) and politician, mayor of Starkville, Mississippi (1985–1989).
- Greg Thompson, 72, Canadian politician, MP (1988–1993, 1997–2011), Minister of Veterans Affairs (2006–2010), cancer.
- Süleyman Turan, 82, Turkish actor (Ayşecik ve Sihirli Cüceler Rüyalar Ülkesinde, Güllü, The Ark of the Sun God), heart attack.
- Lydia Zeitlhofer, 88, German Olympic gymnast (1952).

=== 11 ===
- Carlos Bazán Zender, 81, Peruvian physician and politician, Minister of Health (1985).
- Teneisha Bonner, 37, Jamaican-born English dancer and actress (StreetDance 3D, Mamma Mia! Here We Go Again, Mary Poppins Returns), breast cancer.
- Len Clark, 103, English civil servant and countryside campaigner.
- Jerry Greenspan, 77, American basketball player (Philadelphia 76ers).
- B. J. Habibie, 83, Indonesian politician, President (1998–1999), Vice President (1998) and Minister of Research and Technology (1978–1998), heart failure.
- Daniel Johnston, 58, American singer-songwriter ("Walking the Cow") and visual artist, heart attack.
- Annette Kolodny, 78, American feminist literary critic, infections as a complication from rheumatoid arthritis.
- John M. Last, 92, Canadian public health scholar and author.
- B.C. Lee, 64, Taiwanese-born Canadian actor (Blood and Water) and politician, liver cancer.
- Mardik Martin, 84, Iranian-born Iraqi-American screenwriter (Raging Bull, Mean Streets, New York, New York).
- T. Boone Pickens, 91, American businessman and philanthropist.
- Maria Postoico, 69, Moldovan politician.
- László Rajk Jr., 70, Hungarian architect (Aquincum Museum), art director (The Martian) and politician, MP (1990–1996).
- Terrell Roberts, 38, American football player (Cincinnati Bengals), shot.
- Shafie Salleh, 72, Malaysian politician, MP (1999–2008), Minister of Higher Education (2004–2006).
- Joe Scudero, 88, American football player (Washington Redskins, Pittsburgh Steelers, Toronto Argonauts), cancer.
- Anne Rivers Siddons, 83, American novelist (Peachtree Road, The House Next Door), lung cancer.
- James B. Stoltman, 84, American archaeologist.
- Zbigniew Szymczak, 67, Polish chess player.
- Sándor Tóth, 80, Hungarian poet, journalist and politician, MP (1990–1994).
- Penny Whetton, 61, Australian climatologist.

=== 12 ===
- Juanita Abernathy, 87, American civil rights activist (Montgomery bus boycott), complications from a stroke.
- Ruth Abrams, 88, American judge.
- Linda Baboolal, 78, Trinidadian politician, President of the Senate (2002–2007).
- Bou Thang, 81, Cambodian politician, Senator (2012–2016) and Deputy Prime Minister (1986–1992, since 2016).
- Sir Norman Browse, 87, British surgeon, President of the States of Alderney (2002–2011).
- Al Crow, 87, American football player (Boston Patriots).
- Sir Hugh Cunningham, 97, British military officer, Deputy Chief of the Defence Staff (1976–1978).
- Wade Doak, 79, New Zealand marine conservationist.
- Bill Egerton, 75, British politician, Lord Mayor of Manchester (1992–1993).
- Michael E. Haynes, 92, American minister and politician, member of the Massachusetts House of Representatives (1965–1969).
- The Hun, 81, American cartoonist.
- Ida Laila, 75, Indonesian singer.
- I. Beverly Lake Jr., 85, American jurist, Chief Justice of the North Carolina Supreme Court (2001–2006).
- Levon Manaseryan, 94, Armenian painter.
- László Marton, 76, Hungarian theatre director.
- Noriko Miyagawa, 40, Japanese politician, breast cancer.
- ʻAkilisi Pōhiva, 78, Tongan politician and activist, Prime Minister (since 2014), pneumonia.
- Keith Robbins, 79, British historian and vice-chancellor of University of Wales, Lampeter (1992–2003).
- Francis Xavier Roque, 90, American Roman Catholic prelate, Auxiliary Bishop of Military Archdiocese (1983–2004).
- Bill Rowekamp, 89, American football player (Edmonton Eskimos).
- Bill Schelly, 67, American writer, multiple myeloma.
- Dennis Schmitz, 82, American poet.
- Ed Stankiewicz, 89, Canadian ice hockey player (Detroit Red Wings).
- Martin Trust, 84, American businessman and philanthropist.
- Elsie Vartanian, 89, American politician, member of the Massachusetts House of Representatives, director of the United States Women's Bureau.

=== 13 ===
- Thomas A. Aldrich, 95, American USAF major general.
- Martha Alf, 89, American artist.
- Asadollah Asgaroladi, 85, Iranian businessman, stroke.
- James Bacque, 90, Canadian writer.
- Magdalen Berns, 36, Scottish YouTuber, glioblastoma.
- Cynthia Cockburn, 85, British feminist and peace activist.
- Paul Cronin, 81, Australian actor (The Sullivans, Matlock Police, State Coroner).
- Leon Crouch, 70, English businessman, cancer.
- Micky Donnelly, 67, Northern Irish artist, intracerebral hemorrhage.
- Dennis Edwards, 82, English footballer (Charlton Athletic).
- Rene Espina, 89, Filipino politician, Senator (1970–1973) and Governor of Cebu (1963–1968).
- Mary Anne Frey, 84, American aerospace physician.
- Artie Gaffin, 70, American stage manager.
- Larry Garron, 82, American football player (Boston Patriots).
- Alex Grammas, 93, American baseball player (St. Louis Cardinals) and coach (Cincinnati Reds, Detroit Tigers).
- Bruno Grandi, 85, Italian sports executive, President of the International Gymnastics Federation (1996–2016).
- Rudi Gutendorf, 93, German football manager (FC Luzern, Schalke 04, China national team).
- Charles Henderson, 96, Australian Olympic weightlifter (1956).
- Bavelile Hlongwa, 38, South African politician, MP (since 2019), traffic collision.
- Ghulam Shah Jeelani, 62, Pakistani politician, member of the Provincial Assembly of Sindh (since 2008), kidney failure.
- Frank Key, 60, British writer.
- György Konrád, 86, Hungarian novelist and political dissident, President of PEN International (1990–1993).
- Joachim Messing, 73, German-American microbiologist.
- Eddie Money, 70, American singer ("Take Me Home Tonight") and songwriter ("Two Tickets to Paradise", "Baby Hold On"), complications from heart surgery.
- Nana Yaa Nyamaa II, 64, Ghanaian royal, queen of Sunyani (since 1972).
- Noel O'Donovan, 69, Irish actor (Rawhead Rex, The Field, Far and Away).
- Brian Turk, 49, American actor (Carnivàle, General Hospital, Murder of a Cat).
- Nanos Valaoritis, 98, Greek writer.
- Joseph Peter Wilson, 84, American Olympic cross-country skier (1960).
- Steven Zucker, 70, American mathematician.

=== 14 ===
- Else Ackermann, 85, German politician.
- Gene Bacque, 82, American baseball player (Hanshin Tigers, Kintetsu Buffaloes), complications from abdominal aneurysm surgery.
- Paul Bannai, 99, American politician.
- Jean Heywood, 98, British actress (When the Boat Comes In, Our Day Out, Billy Elliot).
- Edmund Jones, 101, American politician, member of the Pennsylvania House of Representatives (1971–1974).
- Claudia Ochoa Félix, 32, Mexican model, pulmonary aspiration from drug overdose.
- Julian Piper, 72, English blues guitarist.
- John Ralston, 92, American Hall of Fame football coach (Utah State, Stanford, Denver Broncos).
- William Bradford Reynolds, 77, American attorney.
- Kathleen M. Richardson, 91, Canadian businesswoman and philanthropist, President of the Royal Winnipeg Ballet (1957–1961).
- Bill Schermbrucker, 81, Kenyan-Canadian academic and author.
- Sam Szafran, 84, French artist.
- Roberto Villetti, 75, Italian politician.
- Tom Waddell, 60, Scottish-American baseball player (Cleveland Indians).
- Hubert W. Woodruff, 96, American politician.
- Wu Yigong, 80, Chinese film director (My Memories of Old Beijing, Evening Rain, The Tribulations of a Chinese Gentleman).

=== 15 ===
- James J. Agazzi, 78, American art director and production designer (Hart to Hart, Match Game, Moonlighting).
- Fausto Alvarado, 69, Peruvian politician and historian, Congressman (1990–1992, 2001–2006) and Minister of Justice (2002–2004).
- Heather Ashton, 90, British psychopharmacologist and physician.
- Leah Bracknell, 55, British actress (Emmerdale, Casualty 1900s, The Royal Today), lung cancer.
- Lol Mahamat Choua, 80, Chadian politician, President (1979).
- Sir Michael Edwardes, 88, British-South African businessman, Chairman of British Leyland (1977–1982) and International Computers Limited (1984).
- Chadlia Farhat Essebsi, 83, Tunisian consort, First Lady (2014–2019).
- Heikki Häiväoja, 90, Finnish sculptor and coin designer.
- Eva Haldimann, 92, Swiss literary critic and translator.
- David Hurst, 93, German-British actor (Kelly's Heroes, The Boys from Brazil, Hello, Dolly!).
- André Jourdain, 84, French politician.
- Roberto Leal, 67, Portuguese-Brazilian singer, skin cancer.
- Robert D. Lewis, 87, American politician.
- Tonny Maringgi, 60, Indonesian Olympic table tennis player (1988).
- Phyllis Newman, 86, American actress (Subways Are for Sleeping, Mannequin, To Find a Man) and singer.
- Arthur Nims, 96, American federal judge.
- Keith Foote Nyborg, 89, American diplomat. Ambassador to Finland (1981–1986).
- Ric Ocasek, 75, American Hall of Fame musician (The Cars), singer-songwriter ("My Best Friend's Girl", "You Might Think") and record producer, cardiovascular disease.
- Johann Pollak, 70, Austrian Olympic judoka (1972, 1976).
- Waldemar Rial, 79, Uruguayan Olympic basketball player.
- Eifion Roberts, 91, British judge and politician.
- Andrés Sardá Sacristán, 90, Spanish fashion designer (Andrés Sardá).
- Munroe Scott, 92, Canadian writer.
- Jawahir Shah, 77, Kenyan cricketer (national team)
- Montserrat Soliva Torrentó, 76, Spanish chemistry doctor, specialist in composting.
- Mike Stefanik, 61, American racing driver, seven-time NASCAR Whelen Modified Tour champion, plane crash.
- Marcelo Trujillo, 84, Puerto Rican politician, mayor of Humacao (since 2001), cardiac arrest.
- Mark von Hagen, 65, American military historian.
- Azellia White, 106, American aviator.

=== 16 ===
- Pamela Ball, 92, Jamaican-British surgeon, first Jamaican woman to become a fellow of the Royal College of Surgeons of England, bone cancer.
- Anthony R. Bucco, 81, American politician, member of the New Jersey General Assembly (1995–1998) and Senate (since 1998), heart attack.
- Henry Buttelmann, 90, American fighter pilot.
- Sir Toby Clarke, 80, British businessman.
- John Cohen, 87, American folk musician (New Lost City Ramblers) and musicologist.
- Luigi Colani, 91, German industrial designer.
- Steve Dalachinsky, 72, American poet, stroke.
- Peter Stormonth Darling, 86, British investment banker.
- H. S. Dillon, 74, Indonesian agricultural expert, political economist and human rights activist.
- Olga Duque de Ospina, 89, Colombian politician and diplomat, Minister of Education (1996–1997), Senator (1978–1982, 1986–1990) and Governor of Huila (1974–1975).
- Sir Donald Gosling, 90, British vice admiral and businessman, Chairman of National Car Parks (1959–1998).
- Paul Ingrassia, 69, American journalist, Managing Editor of Reuters (2011–2016), Pulitzer Prize winner (1993), cancer.
- Davo Karničar, 56, Slovenian mountaineer, hit by falling tree.
- B. J. Khatal-Patil, 100, Indian politician, MLA (1962–1985).
- Ira A. Lipman, 78, American businessman, founder of Guardsmark, cancer.
- Peter Lucas, 89, Australian footballer (Collingwood).
- Ascención Mendieta, 93, Spanish anti-White Terror activist.
- Eric Woodfin Naylor, 82, American Hispanist.
- Manuel Delgado Parker, 82, Peruvian businessman, founder of Grupo RPP.
- Bobby Prentice, 65, Scottish footballer (Heart of Midlothian, Toronto Blizzard).
- Kodela Siva Prasada Rao, 72, Indian politician, MLA (since 1983), suicide by hanging.
- Sakahoko Nobushige, 58, Japanese sumo wrestler and coach (Izutsu stable), pancreatic cancer.
- Sander Vanocur, 91, American political journalist, complications from dementia.
- Kees Vermunt, 88, Dutch footballer.
- Vic Vogel, 84, Canadian jazz pianist, composer and conductor.

=== 17 ===
- Fabio Buzzi, 76, Italian motorboat racer, founder of FB Design, motorboat crash.
- Carlos Cisneros, 71, American politician, member of the New Mexico Senate (since 1985), heart attack.
- Dominique Damiani, 66, French Olympic racing cyclist (1984).
- Khem Singh Gill, 89, Indian geneticist and plant breeder, Vice-Chancellor of the Punjab Agricultural University (1990–1993).
- Jessica Jaymes, 40, American Hall of Fame pornographic actress, seizure.
- Harold Mabern, 83, American jazz pianist and composer, heart attack.
- Robert Oatey, 77, Australian footballer (Norwood, Sturt).
- Cokie Roberts, 75, American journalist (ABC News, NPR), political commentator and author, complications from breast cancer.
- Fred T. Sai, 95, Ghanaian family health physician.
- Sathaar, 67, Indian actor (Ottayan, God for Sale), liver disease.
- Dina Ugorskaja, 46, Russian-born German pianist, cancer.
- Suzanne Whang, 56, American actress (Las Vegas, From Here on OUT) and television host (House Hunters), breast cancer.
- Roy Williamson, 86, British Anglican cleric, Bishop of Southwark (1991–1998).
- Harvey Wylie, 86, Canadian football player (Calgary Stampeders).
- Ye Xuanping, 94, Chinese politician, Mayor of Guangzhou (1980–1985) and Governor of Guangdong (1985–1991).

=== 18 ===
- Julius H. Baggett, 94, American politician and judge.
- Lady Anne Berry, 99, English-New Zealand horticulturist, founder of Rosemoor Garden.
- Robert H. Blackburn, 100, Canadian academic librarian.
- Alexandru Darie, 60, Romanian theater director.
- Chuck Dauphin, 45, American sports radio broadcaster and country music journalist, complications from diabetes.
- Ibrahim El-Orabi, 88, Egyptian military officer, Chief of Staff of Armed Forces (1983–1987).
- Graeme Gibson, 85, Canadian novelist.
- Imata Kabua, 76, Marshallese politician, President (1997–2000).
- José López, 89, Cuban Olympic wrestler.
- Constantine Lyngdoh, 63, Indian politician.
- Kelvin Maynard, 32, Surinamese-born Dutch footballer (Burton Albion, FC Volendam, FC Emmen), shot.
- Tony Mills, 57, English rock singer (Shy, TNT), pancreatic cancer.
- H. R. Mithrapala, 73, Sri Lankan politician, MP (2004–2015) and Minister of Consumer Affairs (2007–2010).
- Shyam Ramsay, 67, Indian film director (Darwaza, Veerana) and screenwriter (Zee Horror Show), pneumonia.
- Fernando Ricksen, 43, Dutch footballer (Fortuna Sittard, Rangers, national team), motor neurone disease.
- Masako Seki, 77, Japanese table tennis player.
- Richard Watson, 88, American philosopher and speleologist.
- Dolly Zegerius, 94, Indonesian athlete.
- Zhang Zhenxin, 48, Chinese financial entrepreneur, multiple organ failure.

=== 19 ===
- Zine El Abidine Ben Ali, 83, Tunisian military officer and politician, Prime Minister (1987) and President (1987–2011), prostate cancer.
- Irina Bogacheva, 80, Russian mezzo-soprano.
- Luigi Bommarito, 93, Italian Roman Catholic prelate, Bishop of Agrigento (1976–1980) and Archbishop of Catania (1988–2002).
- Cecil H. Coggins, 85, American nephrologist.
- Wim Crouwel, 90, Dutch graphic and type designer (New Alphabet).
- Marko Feingold, 106, Austrian Holocaust survivor.
- Maurice Ferré, 84, American politician, Mayor of Miami (1973–1985) and member of the Florida House of Representatives (1967–1968), spinal cancer.
- Charles Gérard, 96, French actor (The Toy, Animal, A Man and a Woman: 20 Years Later).
- Barron Hilton, 91, American businessman, Chairman of Hilton Hotels Corporation (1966–2007), co-founder of the AFL and owner of the Los Angeles Chargers (1960–1966).
- Sam Hinds, 66, American baseball player (Milwaukee Brewers).
- Virginia Isbell, 87, American educator and politician.
- Sandie Jones, 68, Irish singer ("Ceol an Ghrá").
- Jason McManus, 85, American journalist.
- Peter J. McQuillan, 90, American judge.
- S. K. Padmadevi, 95, Indian actress (Bhakta Dhruva, Samsara Nauka, Gangavathar).
- Koča Pavlović, 57, Montenegrin journalist and politician, MP (since 2006).
- Peppers Pride, 16, American racehorse, euthanized.
- María Rivas, 59, Venezuelan Latin jazz singer, composer and painter, cancer.
- Levente Riz, 44, Hungarian politician, MP (2010–2014).
- Yonrico Scott, 63, American drummer (The Derek Trucks Band).
- Ibrahim Sesay, Sierra Leonean politician, MP.
- Sol Stein, 92, American publisher (Stein and Day), complications from dementia.
- Larry Wallis, 70, English musician (Pink Fairies, Motörhead).
- John Winston, 91, English actor (Star Trek).
- Henry Woods, 95, British army major general.

=== 20 ===
- Nikken Abe, 96, Japanese Buddhist monk, High Priest of Nichiren Shōshū (1978–2005).
- Abraham Octavianus Atururi, 68, Indonesian military officer and politician, Governor of West Papua Province (2006–2017).
- Rick Bognar, 49, Canadian wrestler (WWF, NJPW, FMW), heart attack.
- Robert Boyd, 91, American journalist (Knight Ridder) and bureau chief, Pulitzer Prize winner (1973), heart failure.
- Wayne Brown, 88, Canadian ice hockey player (Boston Bruins, Seattle Bombers, Tacoma Rockets).
- Myles Burnyeat, 80, British philosopher and scholar.
- Howard Cassady, 85, American Hall of Fame football player (Ohio State, Detroit Lions, Cleveland Browns), Heisman Trophy winner (1955).
- Séamus Hegarty, 79, Irish Roman Catholic prelate, Bishop of Raphoe (1982–1994) and Derry (1994–2011).
- Diarmuid Lawrence, 71, British television director.
- Jim Macken, 92, Australian judge.
- Gregorio Martínez Sacristán, 72, Spanish Roman Catholic prelate, Bishop of Zamora (since 2007).
- Jan Merlin, 94, American actor (Gunfight at Comanche Creek, Take the Money and Run, The Twilight People).
- Patrick O'Neil, 77, American computer scientist.
- Marie Parente, 91, American politician.
- Eric Samuelsen, 63, American playwright.
- Su Beng, 100, Taiwanese dissident, political activist and historian (Modern History of Taiwanese in 400 Years), Senior advisor (since 2016), multiple organ failure.
- Tsang Hin-chi, 85, Hong Kong entrepreneur and politician, member of the Standing Committee of the National People's Congress (1994–2008).
- Frans Van Looy, 69, Belgian Olympic racing cyclist (1972), suicide.
- Cheryl White, 65, American jockey.

=== 21 ===
- Gerhard Auer, 76, German rower, Olympic champion (1972).
- Tommy Brooker, 79, American football player (Alabama, Dallas Texans/Kansas City Chiefs).
- Napoleon Chagnon, 81, American anthropologist.
- Mel Chionglo, 73, Filipino film director (Sibak: Midnight Dancers, Burlesk King, Twilight Dancers).
- David Combe, 76, Australian lobbyist (Combe-Ivanov affair).
- Jean-Claude Coucardon, 69, French Olympic rower (1972, 1976).
- Jack Donner, 90, American actor (As the World Turns, Four Christmases, All About Evil).
- Aron Eisenberg, 50, American actor (Star Trek: Deep Space Nine, The Horror Show, Prayer of the Rollerboys), heart failure.
- Sid Haig, 80, American actor (The Devil's Rejects, Jason of Star Command, THX 1138), complications from a lung infection.
- Leigh Harris, 65, American singer, breast cancer.
- E. J. Holub, 81, American Hall of Fame football player (Dallas Texans/Kansas City Chiefs).
- Sigmund Jähn, 82, German cosmonaut (Soyuz 31, Soyuz 29).
- Günter Kunert, 90, German writer.
- George Lardner, 85, American journalist (The Washington Post), Pulitzer Prize winner (1993), complications from strokes.
- Karin Larsson, 78, Swedish Olympic swimmer (1956, 1960).
- Gerard Mannion, 48, Irish theologian and ecumenist.
- Stan Quintana, 74, American football player.
- Mohamed Farid Md Rafik, 43, Malaysian politician, MP (since 2018), heart attack.
- Jarred Rome, 42, American Olympic discus thrower (2004, 2012), fentanyl overdose.
- Christopher Rouse, 70, American composer, Grammy (2002) and Pulitzer Prize winner (1993), complications from kidney cancer.
- Carl Ruiz, 44, American chef and television personality, heart attack.
- Naramalli Sivaprasad, 68, Indian actor (Khaidi, Aatadista) and politician, MP (2009–2019), kidney failure.
- Jevan Snead, 32, American football player (Tampa Bay Buccaneers, Tampa Bay Storm), suicide.
- Boriss Teterevs, 65, Latvian businessman and film producer (Machete Kills, Sin City: A Dame to Kill For).
- Shuping Wang, 59, Chinese-American medical researcher and public health whistleblower.
- Woo Hye-mi, 31, South Korean singer (The Voice of Korea).
- Aleko Yordan, 83, Turkish footballer (Beykoz, AEK, national team).

=== 22 ===
- Vytautas Briedis, 79, Lithuanian rower, Olympic bronze medallist (1968).
- Rosemarie Burian, 83, American humanitarian, founder of the Northern Illinois Food Bank.
- Wally Chambers, 68, American football player (Chicago Bears, Tampa Bay Buccaneers).
- Courtney Cox Cole, 48, American basketball player (Indiana Hoosiers), lung cancer.
- Chartwell Dutiro, 62, Zimbabwean musician.
- Harry Joseph Flynn, 86, American Roman Catholic prelate, Archbishop of Saint Paul and Minneapolis (1995–2008), cancer.
- Tom Frantz, 76, American racing driver.
- Nat Frazier, 84, American college basketball coach (Morgan State), complications from heart disease.
- Rodolfo Guarnieri, 91, Argentine Olympic sport shooter.
- Ahmad Said Hamdan, 67, Malaysian civil servant, Chief Commissioner of the Malaysian Anti-Corruption Commission (2007–2009), complications from a stroke.
- Masroor Jahan, 81, Indian Urdu author.
- Ivan Kizimov, 91, Russian equestrian, Olympic champion (1968, 1972).
- Jack Meda, 73, Canadian boxer, heart attack.
- J. Michael Mendel, 54, American television producer (The Simpsons, Rick and Morty, The Critic), Emmy winner (1995, 1997, 1998, 2018).
- Nguyễn Văn Bảy, 83, Vietnamese jet fighter pilot.
- Miguel Patiño Velázquez, 80, Mexican Roman Catholic prelate, Bishop of Apatzingán (1981–2014).
- Douglas H. Parker, 93, American legal scholar.
- Lee Paul, 80, American actor (The Sting, Hawaii Five-O, Ben).
- Tom Polanic, 76, Canadian ice hockey player (Minnesota North Stars).
- Sándor Sára, 85, Hungarian cinematographer (Ten Thousand Days, Szindbád) and film director (The Upthrown Stone).

=== 23 ===
- Al Alvarez, 90, English poet (The New Poetry) and writer (The Biggest Game in Town), pneumonia.
- Madhav Apte, 86, Indian cricket player (national team) and administrator, President of the Cricket Club of India (since 1989), cardiac arrest.
- Huguette Caland, 88, Lebanese painter.
- Dean Clukey, 83, American politician.
- Leslie Edwards Jr., 95, American pilot (Tuskegee Airmen).
- Andre Emmett, 37, American basketball player (Texas Tech, Memphis Grizzlies), shot.
- Fan Kang, 95, Chinese economic historian.
- Elaine Feinstein, 88, English poet.
- Lambert Hehl, 95, American politician.
- Robert Hunter, 78, American Hall of Fame lyricist (Grateful Dead, Jerry Garcia, Bob Dylan), poet and musician.
- Harri Hurme, 74, Finnish chess player.
- William Green Miller, 88, American diplomat, second United States ambassador to Ukraine.
- Ginny NiCarthy, 92, American writer.
- Walter Nicoletti, 66, Italian football manager (Empoli, Pisa, Livorno).
- Joan Petersilia, 68, American criminologist, ovarian cancer.
- Artūras Rimkevičius, 36, Lithuanian footballer (FBK Kaunas, FK Liepājas Metalurgs, Šiauliai), suicide by gunshot.
- Tauto Sansbury, 70, Australian social justice advocate, non-Hodgkin lymphoma.
- Arifin Siregar, 85, Indonesian bureaucrat, Minister of Trade (1988–1993), Governor of the Bank Indonesia (1983–1988).
- Jānis Šmits, 51, Latvian politician and Lutheran pastor.
- James Spilker, 86, American electrical engineer.
- Gordon C. Stauffer, 89, American college basketball coach (Washburn, Indiana State, Nicholls).
- Asim Umar, Pakistani terrorist, leader of Al-Qaeda in the Indian Subcontinent, air strike.
- Curt Wittlin, 78, Swiss philologist.
- Robert Zelnick, 79, American journalist (ABC News).

=== 24 ===
- Vurgun Ayyub, 61, Azerbaijani scientist.
- Luz Bulnes, 92, Chilean magistrate and academic, member of the Constitutional Court (1989–2002).
- Mordicai Gerstein, 83, American illustrator (Something Queer Is Going On), film director (The Berenstain Bears' Christmas Tree) and writer (The Man Who Walked Between the Towers).
- Tom Gilmore, 82, American politician.
- Jack Hatton, 24, American judoka, suicide.
- Abdellah Kadiri, 82, Moroccan politician and military officer, co-founder of the National Democratic Party.
- Magnar Lussand, 74, Norwegian politician, County Mayor of Hordaland (1991–1999).
- Jimmy Nelson, 90, American ventriloquist (Farfel the Dog), complications from a stroke.
- Luisito M. Reyes, 89, Filipino politician, Governor of Marinduque (1988–1995).
- Joyce Reynolds, 94, American actress (The Adventures of Mark Twain, Girls' School, Wallflower).
- Alfonso de Salas, 76, Spanish journalist, co-founder of El Mundo.
- Sana Solh, 80, Lebanese human rights activist.
- Donald L. Tucker, 84, American politician, member (1966–1978) and Speaker of the Florida House of Representatives (1975–1978).
- Roger H. Zion, 98, American politician, member of the U.S. House of Representatives from Indiana (1967–1975).

=== 25 ===
- Paul Badura-Skoda, 91, Austrian pianist.
- Michael D. Coe, 90, American archaeologist and anthropologist.
- Jesper Hoffmeyer, 77, Danish biologist, heart attack.
- Liakat Ali Khan, 64, Indian politician, MLA (1991–1996) and (2006–2011).
- Venu Madhav, 39, Indian comedian and actor (Master, Tholi Prema, Hungama), kidney disease.
- John McAdorey, 45, Irish Olympic sprinter (2000), melanoma.
- Isaac Namioka, 91, Japanese-born American mathematician.
- Donald Nicholls, Baron Nicholls of Birkenhead, 86, British jurist, Lord of Appeal in Ordinary (1994–2007).
- Hitoshi Nozaki, 97, Japanese chemist, co-discoverer of Nozaki–Hiyama–Kishi reaction.
- Štefan Pipa, 60, Slovak Olympic volleyball player.
- Linda Porter, 86, American actress (Superstore, Dude, Where's My Car?, Twin Peaks), cancer.
- Raymond Roberts, 88, Welsh Anglican priest and Royal Navy chaplain, Chaplain of the Fleet (1980–1984).
- Armand Solie, 75, Belgian Olympic field hockey player.
- Libi Staiger, 91, American actress (The Most Happy Fella).
- Arne Weise, 89, Swedish journalist and television personality (Sveriges Television).
- Sir John Wilsey, 80, British general, Commander-in-Chief, Land Forces (1993–1996).
- Richard Wyands, 91, American jazz pianist.

=== 26 ===
- Lawrence J. Barkwell, 76, Canadian historian.
- Giovanni Bramucci, 72, Italian road cyclist, Olympic bronze medallist (1968).
- Plato Cacheris, 90, American defense lawyer, pneumonia.
- Jim Chapman, 84, American football coach.
- Jacques Chirac, 86, French politician, President of France and Co-Prince of Andorra (1995–2007), Prime Minister (1974–1976, 1986–1988) and Mayor of Paris (1977–1995).
- Mac Conner, 105, American commercial illustrator.
- Peter Downsborough, 76, English footballer (Halifax Town, Swindon Town, Bradford City).
- David Sidney Feingold, 96, American biochemist.
- King Billy Cokebottle, 70, Australian comedian.
- William Levada, 83, American Roman Catholic cardinal, Archbishop of Portland (1986–1995) and San Francisco (1995–2005).
- Dan Lovén, 58, Swedish Olympic sailor (1984).
- Gennady Manakov, 69, Russian cosmonaut (Soyuz TM-10, Soyuz TM-16).
- Joe Mason, 79, Scottish footballer (Morton, Kilmarnock, Rangers).
- Imre Molnár, 70, Hungarian Olympic gymnast (1972, 1976).
- Nick Polano, 78, Canadian ice hockey player (Philadelphia Blazers) and coach (Detroit Red Wings).
- Alan Rayburn, 86, Canadian geographer.
- Ronald L. Schlicher, 63, American diplomat, Ambassador to Lebanon (1994–1996) and Cyprus (2005–2008).
- Irene Shubik, 89, British television producer.
- Sun Dafa, 73, Chinese general, Political Commissar of the PLA General Logistics Department (2005–2010).
- Kåre Tønnesson, 93, Norwegian historian.
- Vukašin Višnjevac, 80, Bosnian football manager (Sarajevo, Vardar, Leotar).
- Martin Wesley-Smith, 74, Australian composer, cancer.

=== 27 ===
- Rudy Behlmer, 92, American film historian and writer.
- Dante Bernini, 97, Italian Roman Catholic prelate, Bishop of Velletri-Segni (1981–1982) and Albano (1982–1999).
- Abu Solaiman Chowdhury, 69, Bangladeshi civil servant.
- Jack Edwards, 91, American politician, member of the U.S. House of Representatives (1965–1985), pancreatic cancer.
- Rob Garrison, 59, American actor (The Karate Kid, Iron Eagle, Prom Night), organ failure.
- Larry Hale, 77, Canadian ice hockey player (Philadelphia Flyers).
- Ed Heavey, 90, American politician.
- Barrie Karp, 72, American artist and academic.
- Rana Muhammad Afzal Khan, 70, Pakistani military officer and politician, Minister of Finance, Revenue and Economic Affairs (2017–2018) and MP (2013–2018), heart disease.
- John Francis Kinney, 82, American Roman Catholic prelate, Bishop of Bismarck (1982–1995) and Saint Cloud (1995–2013).
- Jack Lasenby, 88, New Zealand children's author.
- Sir Anthony Seymour Laughton, 92, British oceanographer.
- Gene Melchiorre, 92, American basketball player (Bradley Braves).
- Mohammed Manga, 42, Senegalese-born Nigerian footballer.
- Kiyoshi Nagai, 70, Japanese structural biologist, liver cancer.
- Guillermo Perry, 73, Colombian economist and politician, Minister of Finance and Public Credit (1994–1996) and of Mines and Energy (1986–1988).
- Russell Robins, 87, Welsh rugby union player (Pontypridd, national team).
- Balireddy Satya Rao, 81, Indian politician, minister (1992–1994), MLA (1989–1994) and (1999–2004), traffic collision.
- Inder Singh, 86, American human rights activist, founder of GOPIO.
- Jan Schmidt, 85, Czech film director (The Lanfier Colony).
- Marvin Shore, 90, Canadian politician.
- John J. Snyder, 93, American Roman Catholic prelate, Bishop of St. Augustine (1979–2000), namesake of Bishop John J. Snyder High School.
- Jimmy Spicer, 61, American rapper, brain and lung cancer.
- József Szekó, 64, Hungarian politician, MP (2010–2014).
- Inés Talamantez, American ethnographer.
- Marcel Troupel, 89, French Olympic sailor.
- Ted Vogel, 94, American Olympic runner.
- Joseph C. Wilson, 69, American writer (The Politics of Truth) and diplomat, Ambassador to Gabon (1992–1995), organ failure.
- Ian Robert Young, 87, British medical physicist.

=== 28 ===
- Peter Adam, 90, German-born British filmmaker and author.
- Willie Adams, 77, American football player (Washington Redskins, Montreal Alouettes).
- José Aldunate, 102, Chilean Roman Catholic theologian and human rights activist.
- Suad Beširević, 56, Slovenian football player (Borac Banja Luka, Apollon Limassol) and manager (Olimpija Ljubljana).
- Ray Brain, 66, Australian rules footballer (Fitzroy).
- M. Chandran, 77, Malaysian Olympic football player (1972), (Selangor, national team) and manager.
- Franco Cuter, 79, Italian-born Brazilian Roman Catholic prelate, Bishop of Grajaú (1998–2016).
- Alexander Davion, 90, French-born British actor (Gideon's Way).
- John Haylett, 74, British journalist, editor of the Morning Star (1995–2009).
- Ismail Petra of Kelantan, 69, Malaysian royal, Sultan of Kelantan (1979–2010).
- José José, 71, Mexican singer ("El Triste", "Como Tú") and actor (Gavilán o Paloma), pancreatic cancer.
- Jan Kobuszewski, 85, Polish actor (Kwiecień, Alternatywy 4).
- Loyd Lowe, 90, American football player (Chicago Bears).
- Nicolás Nogueras, 84, Puerto Rican politician, Senator (1973–1985, 1988–1996), heart disease.
- Dessie O'Halloran, 79, Irish fiddler and vocalist.
- Graciela Palau de Nemes, 100, Cuban literary critic.
- Val Pelizzaro, 88, American soccer player and coach.
- Bill Ridley, 91, American college basketball player (Illinois).
- Baikunth Lal Sharma, 89, Indian politician, MP (1991–2009).
- Hogan Sheffer, 61, American television writer (The Young and the Restless, As the World Turns, Days of Our Lives).
- Gérard Tremblay, 100, Canadian Roman Catholic prelate, Auxiliary Bishop of Montréal (1981–1991).
- Vitaly Voloshinov, 72, Russian physicist.
- Mark Zakharov, 85, Russian theater and film director (The Twelve Chairs, An Ordinary Miracle, To Kill a Dragon), pneumonia.

=== 29 ===
- Beatriz Aguirre, 94, Mexican actress (The Tiger of Jalisco, Flight 971, My Mother Is Guilty).
- Luz Amorocho, 97, Colombian architect.
- Shimon Ballas, 89, Iraqi-Israeli writer.
- Martin Bernheimer, 83, American music critic, Pulitzer Prize winner (1982), sarcoma.
- busbee, 43, American songwriter ("Try", "Our Kind of Love", "Summer Nights") and music producer, glioblastoma.
- John D'Arcy, 84, Australian football player (Richmond).
- Patsy Elsener, 89, American diver, Olympic silver medallist (1948).
- Jiang Weipu, 93, Chinese lianhuanhua artist, publisher, and historian.
- Paavo Korhonen, 91, Finnish Olympic Nordic skier (1952, 1956, 1960), world champion (1958).
- Ilkka Laitinen, 57, Finnish military officer, Chief of the Border Guard (2018–2019) and executive director of Frontex (2005–2014).
- Jack Lawrence, 85, Australian rules footballer (North Melbourne).
- Yuriy Meshkov, 73, Russian politician, Prime Minister (1994) and President of Crimea (1994–1995).
- Bobby Mitchell, 75, American baseball player (New York Yankees, Milwaukee Brewers).
- Jim Morgan, 85, American basketball player and coach.
- Nguyễn Hữu Hạnh, 93, Vietnamese military officer (Army of the Republic of Vietnam).
- Glen Smith, 90, American college basketball player (Utah).
- Thomas P. Stossel, 78, American hematologist.
- Neil D. Van Sickle, 104, American Air Force major general.
- Larry Willis, 78, American jazz pianist, complications from diabetes.
- Michael de Zoysa, 73, Sri Lankan cricket administrator.

=== 30 ===
- Sir David Akers-Jones, 92, British colonial official, Chief Secretary (1985–1987) and acting Governor of Hong Kong (1986–1987), colon cancer.
- Tom Allsop, 90, Australian footballer (Hawthorn).
- Victoria Braithwaite, 52, British biologist, pancreatic cancer.
- Barbara L. Drinkwater, 92, American physiologist, president of the American College of Sports Medicine (1988–1989).
- Marshall Efron, 81, American actor (The Transformers, THX 1138, Bang the Drum Slowly), cardiac arrest.
- Wayne Fitzgerald, 89, American film (Bonnie and Clyde, The Godfather Part II) and television (The Bronx Zoo) title designer, Emmy winner (1987).
- Shinya Inoué, 98, Japanese-born American scientist.
- Viju Khote, 77, Indian actor (Sholay, Andaz Apna Apna, Zabaan Sambhalke), multiple organ failure.
- Gianni Lenoci, 56, Italian jazz pianist.
- Sharon Malcolm, 72, American politician, member of the West Virginia House of Delegates (since 2018).
- Enrico Masseroni, 80, Italian Roman Catholic prelate, Bishop of Mondovi (1987–1996) and Archbishop of Vercelli (1996–2014).
- Richard Mattessich, 97, Austrian-born Canadian business economist.
- Kornel Morawiecki, 78, Polish politician and theoretical physicist, Senior Marshal of the Sejm (since 2015) and Chairman of Freedom and Solidarity (since 2016), pancreatic cancer.
- Jessye Norman, 74, American opera singer, Grammy winner (1984, 1988, 1989, 1998), Grammy Lifetime Achievement Award (2006), multiple organ failure.
- Ben Pon, 82, Dutch racing driver, Olympic sports shooter (1972) and businessman.
- Louie Rankin, 66, Jamaican-born Canadian dancehall reggae artist and actor (Belly, Shottas), traffic collision.
- Jeff Sayle, 77, Australian rugby union player.
- Ed Simonini, 65, American football player (Baltimore Colts, New Orleans Saints), cancer.
- Pete Turnham, 99, American politician, member of the Alabama House of Representatives (1958–1998).
