= Len Clarke =

Leonard or Len Clarke may refer to:

- Len Clarke (footballer, born 1905) (1905–1975), Australian rules footballer
- Len Clarke (footballer, born 1908) (1908–1985), English footballer

== See also ==
- Leonard Clark (disambiguation)
- Leo Clarke (disambiguation)
