= Munt =

Munt may refer to:

== People ==
- Janice Munt (born 1955), Australian politician
- Maxine Munt (1912–2000), American dancer, educator
- Natalie Munt (born 1977), British badminton player
- Sally Rowena Munt, British feminist and academic
- Tessa Munt (born 1959), British politician
- Alice Munt and William Munt, two of the 16th-century Colchester Martyrs

== Other uses ==
- Arenys de Munt, a municipality in Catalonia, Spain
- A Zimbabwean ethnic slur for black people
- A slang term for a type of necrophilia involving two people
- A slang term for getting drunk, used in Australia and New Zealand

== See also ==
- De Munt (disambiguation)
- Vermunt (disambiguation)
