= Leonard Clark =

Leonard or Len Clark may refer to:

- Len Stockwell (Leonard Clark Stockwell, 1859–1905), American professional baseball player
- Leonard Clark (poet) (1905–1981), English poet and anthropologist
- Leonard Clark (explorer) (1907–1957), American explorer, writer, and OSS colonel
- Len Clark (cricketer) (1914–2000)
- Len Clark (countryside campaigner) (1916–2019)
- Len Clark (footballer) (b. 1947)
- Leonard Clark, Brisbane Lions player from the 2005 AFL draft
- Leonard Clark, candidate for the Conservative party in the Birmingham City Council election, 2011
- Leonard Clark, a character played by Tom Hollander in Paparazzi
- Leonard Clark, a character played by Herb Vigran in an episode of the television series Dragnet

== See also ==
- Leonard Clarke
- Leo Clarke
