= Stoltman =

Stoltman is a surname. Notable people with this surname include:

- James B. Stoltman (1935–2019), American archaeologist
- Lech Stoltman, Polish Paralympic athlete
- Luke Stoltman (born 1984), Scottish strongman competitor
- Tom Stoltman (born 1994), Scottish strongman competitor
