= Ibrahim Sesay =

Ibrahim Sesay may refer to:

- Ibrahim Kemoh Sessay (fl. 2002-present), Sierra Leonean politician
- Ibrahim Sesay (footballer) (born 2004), Sierra Leonean footballer
- Ibrahim Sesay (politician) (died 2019), Sierra Leonean politician
