= Baggetta =

Baggetta is a surname. Notable people with the surname include:

- Mike Baggetta (born 1979), American guitarist and songwriter
- Vincent Baggetta (1944–2017), American television actor

== See also ==
- Baggett
