= Leo Wesel =

Dutch artist and footballer (1955–2026)

- Born: Leopoldus Marius Maria Wesel; 16 June 1955; Roosendaal, Netherlands
- Died: 13 June 2026 (aged 70); Molini di Triora, Italy
- Education: Royal Academy of Art
- Occupations: Painter; sculptor; lithographer; footballer
- Years active: 1974–2024
- Children: 2
Association football career
- Position: Winger
Youth career
- RBC Roosendaal
Senior career*
Years	Team	Apps	(Gls)
1970s–1976	RBC Roosendaal		
1976–1981	RSC Alliance		
1981–1982	RBC Roosendaal		
1982–1984	RSC Alliance		
1984–1988	Vlissingen		
1988–1991	RSC Alliance		
- * Club domestic league appearances and goals

Leopoldus Marius Maria Wesel (Roosendaal, 16 June 1955 – Molini di Triora, 13 June 2026) known as Leo Wesel, was a Dutch painter, sculptor and lithographer whose career developed across the Netherlands, France and Italy, with exhibitions and artistic activity extending to other parts of Europe and the United States. Before dedicating himself fully to art, he was also an amateur footballer in the Netherlands. He played as a left winger for RBC Roosendaal and RSC Alliance, represented Dutch youth and Olympic-level teams, and attracted interest from professional clubs including Ajax, PSV and NAC Breda. He ultimately chose not to pursue professional football, instead developing a career in the visual arts.

Beginning his artistic career around 1980, Wesel worked in painting, sculpture and lithography. His work developed from an early grounding in Dutch expressionism towards a more personal language incorporating geometric and constructivist elements. His artistic life became closely associated with the French and Italian Rivieras, particularly Ventimiglia, Nice and the Ligurian hinterland. He also worked and exhibited in Hungary.

== Early life and education ==
Leo Wesel was born on 16 June 1955 in Roosendaal, a town in the Dutch province of North Brabant. He developed an interest in art from an early age. A biographical account published in connection with his later exhibition at the Biennale of Contemporary Sacred Art describes Wesel as a child who was already sensitive to forms in matter and colours in natural elements.

He studied at the Royal Academy of Art in The Hague and continued his education at the Academy of Arts in Roosendaal. His formal training was particularly influenced by two Dutch expressionist artists who taught him, Wil Bouthoorn and Wim Schütz.

After completing his studies, Wesel worked for several years as a designer. According to art critic Alain Amiel, he eventually became dissatisfied with the constraints of commissioned design and decided to concentrate on developing his own artistic forms and ideas independently.

Later influences included the French painter Serge Hélénon, the French-Italian artist Bernard Damiano, and the Hungarian constructivists Tamás Konok and István Nádler. These influences contributed to the evolution of Wesel's interest in geometric structures, abstraction, colour and the relationship between form and material.

== Football career ==
=== RBC Roosendaal ===
Wesel came through the youth system of RBC Roosendaal and progressed through the club's youth teams before making his first-team debut in the mid-1970s. Playing primarily as a left winger, he was considered one of the most promising footballers in the Roosendaal region.

During Wesel's years in the first team, RBC played in the Hoofdklasse, then the highest level of Dutch amateur football; in October 1974 he was listed among the division's leading scorers with three goals. In May 1975, RBC took part in the play-offs for the Dutch national championship for Sunday amateurs; reporting the club's 2–1 second-round win over Rood Wit A, De Telegraaf named Wesel as one of its two wingers.

According to RBC Roosendaal, Ajax, PSV and NAC Breda attempted to sign him, but Wesel chose not to pursue a career in professional football. The club recalled that he regarded football as an important and enjoyable part of his life, but did not want it to determine his professional future. BN De Stem remembered him as a creative left-footed player whose footballing talent could have led to a professional career.

=== RSC Alliance ===
In 1976, Wesel joined RSC Alliance in Roosendaal, where he was reunited with his brothers Toon and Paul. The club was then entering one of the most successful periods in its history under coach Wim Rommens, who led the first team from 1975 to 1985. During Rommens's tenure, Alliance progressed from the fourth to the first amateur division and achieved several championships, as well as an unbeaten run of 52 matches. Wesel was among the prominent Roosendaal players in Rommens's successful teams.

In the 1978–79 season, Alliance won the Derde Klasse D championship unbeaten, with Wesel scoring 23 goals and finishing as the team's top scorer.

=== Netherlands Olympic team ===
Amateur national coach Arie de Vroet selected Wesel for the Netherlands under-23 representative side, Jong Oranje.

In 1979, Wesel was selected for the Netherlands Olympic team during the European qualifying campaign for the 1980 Summer Olympics in Moscow. On 31 October 1979, he started in the Group 3 first-round match against Israel at the Municipal Stadium in Beersheba, which ended 1–1; he was replaced by Piet Struijk in the 55th minute. The match is not recognised by FIFA as an official international. The Netherlands finished bottom of the four-team group, taking two points from six matches, and did not qualify.

=== Later football career ===
In 1981, Wesel returned to RBC Roosendaal, where he played under coach Kees Vermunt. That September he played for RBC against the semi-professional side Heracles in the KNVB Cup, equalising just before half-time in a 1–3 home defeat; Algemeen Dagblad described him as the club's new centre-forward, brought in to replace Jan de Bruyn.

He returned to RSC Alliance before Vermunt, by then coach of Vlissingen, brought him to the Zeeland club in 1984. Vlissingen reached the Hoofdklasse for the 1987–88 season. In September 1987 Wesel scored against Sittard, in a match report that described him as a Dutch amateur international, and his team-mates at Vlissingen included the future Netherlands international Peter van Vossen. He also represented the Zeeuws Elftal, the representative side of leading Zeeland amateurs, playing in its 3–3 draw against Club Brugge on 17 May 1988.

Wesel returned to Alliance for a third spell in 1988 and ended his playing career there in 1991.

== Artistic career ==
Wesel began his artistic career around 1980, working across painting, sculpture and lithography.

His work developed from an abstract-expressionist foundation towards a more geometric and constructivist language. His paintings and lithographs explored geometric forms, colour, balance and movement, while his sculptures incorporated materials including slate, ceramic, wood and iron, with some works later transformed into bronze or aluminium. His lithographs were produced in Vác, Hungary.

From 1990 onwards, Wesel lived and worked in Ventimiglia, Italy. He took part in the Lavoro con Ardesia ("Working with Slate") project in Molini di Triora in 2002 and 2003.

From 2011 onwards, Wesel worked increasingly in Nice, France, while maintaining connections with western Liguria. Art critic Alain Amiel, writing in Art Côte d'Azur, situated Wesel's sculptures in a dialogue with Constructivism, the Bauhaus and Cubism, emphasizing the dynamic quality of his geometric forms and his ability to suggest movement through heavy materials such as stone and slate. In its obituary, the Ligurian news site Riviera24 described his work as combining the formal rigour and chromatic balance of Dutch Neoplasticism with forms and colours drawn from the landscape of western Liguria.

=== Exhibitions ===
Wesel's first solo exhibition took place in 1991 at the Giardini Hanbury in Ventimiglia, and from 2006 he showed regularly at the Galerie Laure Matarasso in Nice, which in 2022 presented his sculptures, lithographs and paintings alongside his newly published Beauty and Consolation. In 2013 he held a joint exhibition with the sculptor Kim Boulukos at Art9 Gallery in Budapest. From 1 April to 1 May 2023 the Galerie des Ambassadeurs in Menton showed some fifty of his paintings and sculptures as Rêve et matérialité, an exhibition organised by the Biennale of Contemporary Sacred Art.

His exhibitions in Liguria included presentations at the Museo Archeologico Girolamo Rossi, housed in the Forte dell'Annunziata in Ventimiglia, and the Museo Archeologico in Triora. From 11 May to 8 July 2017 he showed some fifty paintings and bronze sculptures there with Boulukos in a joint exhibition titled Insieme; two of their sculptures were installed beforehand in Largo Torino in Ventimiglia. He also exhibited at the Museo Civico di Santa Tecla in Sanremo and took part in the Agorà event in Bordighera. In 2022, he exhibited with Boulukos at the Forte Santa Tecla in Sanremo in Ancestral Howl – In mezzo a terra, cielo e mare.

=== Public works and collections ===
Wesel produced large-scale public sculptures and works for institutional and private collections. His public works include Quattro Foglie and De boer van Westwollingwou in the sculpture garden of the Palais Carnolès in Menton, Dal mare in San Lorenzo al Mare, and works associated with the Modern Gallery and László Vass Collection in Veszprém. He also created sculptures and other works for locations in Ventimiglia, Vallecrosia al Mare and Roosendaal, including commissions for churches in Vallecrosia and Roosendaal. Two of his sculptures stand in Largo Torino in Ventimiglia. His slate sculpture Dance in the Old Fashioned Way, made at Molini di Triora in 2007, was installed on the Lungo Roya Girolamo Rossi at Largo Bligny in Ventimiglia in July 2011 under the Sculture in uso scheme, after two months on show at the sculpture museum in Menton.

His work entered public and institutional collections in France, Italy, Hungary and the Netherlands, including the Amsterdam University Medical Centre, the Nice University Hospital and Hospital Pasteur in Nice. His sculpture was also represented in the Modern Museum of Constructivism associated with the László Vass Collection in Hungary.

=== Books ===
Wesel published three illustrated books on his work: Chafing Emotions in Forms and Colours (2004), a private edition with a text by Ruud Lapré; The Wind Has a Fever / De Wind Heeft Koorts (2008), issued by Stichting Triora Arte; and Beauty and Consolation (2021), a 240-page monograph published by Kilaman in Nice with texts by Annelies Vlaanderen, Julia Frey, Ruud Lapré and others.

== Death ==
Leo Wesel died on 13 June 2026 in Molini di Triora, Liguria, at the age of 70. He was survived by his children, Diletta and Frederiek.
