= Jarrid =

Jarrid is a given name. Notable people with the given name include:

- Jarrid Famous (born 1988), American-Lebanese basketball player
- Jarrid Frye (born 1985), American basketball player
- Jarrid Geduld (born 1990), South African actor
- Jarrid Wilson (1988–2019), American pastor and author
