= Vermunt =

Vermunt is the name of several people, among whom:

- Kees Vermunt (1931–2019), Dutch professional footballer and football manager
- René Vermunt (born 1952), Dutch professional footballer and football manager

== See also ==
- Vermont
