= Baggett =

Baggett is a surname. Notable people with the surname include:

- Al Baggett (fl. 1933–39), American college football coach
- Alley Baggett (born 1973), American glamour model
- Bill Baggett (1902–1978), English footballer
- Billy Baggett (1929–2015), American professional football player
- Charlie Baggett (born 1953), American football coach
- Julius H. Baggett (1925–2019), American politician
- Kevin Baggett (born 1966), American basketball coach
- Lee Baggett Jr. (1927–1999), American admiral
- Owen J. Baggett (1920–2006), American Army Air Force pilot during WWII
- Samantha Baggett (born 1976), American soccer player
