= Leo Clarke =

Leo Clarke may refer to:

- Leo Clarke (VC) (1892–1916), Canadian recipient of the Victoria Cross
- Leo Clarke (bishop) (1923–2006), Australian bishop
- Leo Clarke (footballer) (1930–2007), Australian rules footballer
- Leo Clarke (rugby league) (born 1978), Australian rugby league footballer
