= Luz Amorocho =

Colombian architect (1922–2019)

- Born: María Luz Amorocho Carreño; 23 April 1922; Bogotá, Colombia
- Died: 29 September 2019 (aged 97)
- Occupation: architect
- Years active: 1946–1988
- Known for: first woman architect in Colombia

Luz Amorocho Carreño (23 April 1922 – 29 September 2019) was the first Colombian woman to graduate as an architect. She presented one of the first urban plans for Bogotá and worked on both public and private buildings in Bogotá throughout her career. Between 1966 and 1988, she served as the Director of the Planning Department of the National University of Colombia and spent a decade documenting the history of the buildings on the campus of the university.

== Early life ==
María Luz Amorocho Carreño was born in 1922 in Bogotá, Colombia to Ana Lucía Carreño Phillips and Marco Amorocho Tulio. Her parents were from Socorro, Santander but had moved to Bogotá for better opportunities. They were poor, but the family had many books and the children were encouraged to study. Amorocho entered college in 1940 and graduated in 1945, from the School of Architecture at the National University of Colombia as the first woman architect of Colombia.

== Career ==
In the year that Amorocho graduated, the Ministry of Education founded the Cundinamarca High School of Female Culture (Spanish: Colegio Mayor de Cultura Femenina de Cundinamarca) under the direction of Ana Restrepo del Corral. Amorocho was named one of the directors of the school and taught draftsmanship and architecture. In 1946, she published an article, Bogotá puede ser una ciudad moderna, (Bogotá can be a modern city) with other Colombian architects, Enrique García, José J. Angulo, and Carlos Martínez, director of the magazine PROA Arquitectura, which caused a sensation. In the article, as Amorocho advocated for Bogotá to modernize based on an urban plan and suggested designs to modify the city. The illustrated article showed how the plazas could be redesigned to provide hygienic apartment housing with green spaces and wide streets and included a management plan for obtaining financing for the construction.

After La Violencia began in 1948, Luz began working for the Ministry of Public Works in Tumaco reconstructing buildings destroyed in the rioting. For two years, she built schools and office buildings and then went to work at the firm of Cuéllar Serrano and Gómez for a decade. The firm, which included partners Gabriel Serrano Camargo, Camilo Cuellar Tamayo and José Gómez Pinzón, was known for designing some of the most important buildings in Bogotá, including many hospitals, the Jockey Club, and several businesses. While she was with them, Amorocho worked on designs and construction for the Hotel Tequendama.

In the 1960s, Amorocho moved to Paris to study and worked with the architect Nicole Sonolet. When she returned from Paris, in 1966, Amorocho began working as the head of the Division of Physics and Planning at the National University. She coordinated a cross-cultural relationship between her friends in France and co-workers in Colombia. She developed construction projects for public spaces, including buildings, gardens, open spaces, parks, and roads. In the 1970s, Amorocho began a project that took her more than a decade to complete, documenting the design, construction and all details of the history of each building on the campus of the National University.

== Death ==
Amorocho died on 29 September 2019 and was buried at the Chapinero Cemetery.
