= Inés Talamantez =

Mescalero ethnographer and theologian

- Born: October 31, 1930; Old Mesilla, New Mexico
- Died: September 27, 2019

Academic background
- Education: University of California, San Diego BA & PhD

Academic work
- Institutions: University of California, Santa Barbara; Dartmouth College; Harvard University
- Main interests: Apache religion and culture
- Notable works: Teaching Religion and Healing
- Notable ideas: Indigenous Studies Group at the American Academy of Religion.

Inés M. Talamantez (October 31, 1930 – September 27, 2019) was an ethnographer and scholar of religion. She was professor of religious studies at University of California, Santa Barbara (UCSB). She was an expert on Native American religion and philosophy.

== Biography ==
Talamantez was a member of the Mescalero Apache nation and was from New Mexico.

Talamantez received her PhD in ethnopoetics and comparative literature from the University of California, San Diego. Talamantez is a member of UCSB's Religious Studies Department. She created a PhD program with an emphasis on Native American religious traditions. The program has awarded PhDs to at least 30 scholars.

Talamantez's areas of research are healing and religion in Native America, women in religion, nature and animals in Native American traditions, and religion and ecology. She has argued on behalf of the preservation of languages, and says that an understanding of the language is necessary for Native American studies scholars. Talamantez conducted anthropological field studies in Mexico and the Southwestern United States. She spent years developing relationships with Apache communities, learning the language and offering up her work for corrections and approval from community members.

Talamantez served as president of the Indigenous Studies Group at the American Academy of Religion. Talamantez co-edited the 2006 book Teaching Religion and Healing. She has been a contributing editor for the Journal of Feminist Studies in Religion. She co-edited the first issue of Hypatia: A Journal of Feminist Philosophy to focus on American Indian women.

== Selected publications ==
- Lawrence E. Sullivan, ed. (2000). "In the Space Between the Earth and the Sky". Native Religions and Cultures of North America: Anthropology of the Sacred. New York: Continuum. ISBN 9780826414861.
- "Vine Deloria Jr., Critic and Coyote: Transforming Universal Conceptions," a festschrift for Vine Deloria Jr., in press.
- "The Presence of Isanaklesh. The Apache Female Deity and the Path of Pollen," updated and reprinted in Unspoken Worlds: Women’s Religious Lives, Wadsworth Press, Third Edition, 2000.
