= Jack Lawrence (footballer) =

Australian rules footballer (1934–2019)

Personal information
- Full name: John Franklin Lawrence
- Born: 2 July 1934
- Died: 29 September 2019 (aged 85)
- Original team: North United
- Height: 185 cm (6 ft 1 in)
- Weight: 74 kg (163 lb)

Playing career^{1}
Years	Club	Games (Goals)
1955, 1957	North Melbourne	9 (3)
- ^{1} Playing statistics correct to the end of 1957.

John Franklin 'Jack' Lawrence (2 July 1934 – 29 September 2019) was an Australian rules footballer who played with North Melbourne in the Victorian Football League (VFL).
