= Leo Clarke (footballer) =

Australian rules footballer

Personal information
- Full name: Leo Francis Clarke
- Born: 11 February 1930
- Died: 18 June 2007 (aged 77)
- Original team: Clifton Hill YCW
- Height: 170 cm (5 ft 7 in)
- Weight: 73 kg (161 lb)

Playing career^{1}
Years	Club	Games (Goals)
1949	Richmond	3 (0)
- ^{1} Playing statistics correct to the end of 1949.

Leo Francis Clarke (11 February 1930 – 18 June 2007) was an Australian rules footballer who played with Richmond in the Victorian Football League (VFL).
