= Peter Adam (filmmaker) =

British filmmaker and author (1929–2019)

Peter Adam (3 August 1929 – 28 September 2019) was a British filmmaker and author. Born in Berlin, Germany, his work included Eileen Gray: Her Life and Work: The Biography (2009), Outlines: David Hockney (1997), and Art of the Third Reich (ISBN 0-8109-1912-5).

== Early life ==
Adam was born in 1929 in Berlin, Germany, the son of Luise (Gurke) and Walter Adam. His family was middle-class. His father was Jewish and his mother Protestant. In 1944, he moved to Austria. He became a British citizen in 1965 before taking up a career in broadcasting.

== Career ==
Adam was an executive producer with the BBC for 22 years. He was the editor of the arts magazines Review and Arena. He was made an Officier des Arts et des Lettres by the French Government. An autobiography, Mémoires à contre-vent, was published in French by Edition La Différence in April 2010, previously issued in English as Not Drowning But Waving. An Autobiography (Andre Deutsch, London 1995). His memoirs detailed his friendships with many prominent filmmakers and writers. Adam was a close friend of the painters Prunella Clough and Keith Vaughan, and contributed much to work on both artists. He was the author of the biography of the architect and designer Eileen Gray, published in England, USA, Germany, France, Japan and Russia. He also wrote a book on David Hockney titled David Hockney and his Friends. His other books included Kertesz by Kertesz and Eisenstaedt by Eisenstaedt. Adam lived between London and France where he had a house at La Garde Freinet. His London house had been bought from painter Prunella Cough. In his final years he left Britain to live between Paris and the south of France, where he married his life partner, the actor Facundo Bo.

== Film works ==
He made over 100 documentaries for BBC Current Affairs and for the Music and Arts Department, among them many prize-winning films:

- Lawrence Durrell's Spirit of Place: nominated for a British Academy Award for Best Factual Programme of 1976
- Richard Strauss Remembered: Golden Award Houston Film Festival for Best Full Length Documentary of 1985
- Lotte Lenya and Kurt Weill: Prix Italia selection
- George Gershwin Remembered: British Academy Nomination for Best Arts Program, 1987; Prime Time Emmy Nomination for Outstanding Special, 1988
- Art of the Third Reich: Winner of the 1989 British Academy Award in 1989 for Best Arts Documentary of the Year

Nominated for the British Film Institute Award
Nominated for an Ace Award in Los Angeles

He made films on Hockney, Luchino Visconti, Edward Albee, Lillian Hellman, Hans Werner Henze, Serge Diaghilev and the Ballets Russes, the German Cinema, and a ten-part series on Modern Architecture. He staged Stravinsky's The Soldier's Tale and Kurt Weill's The Little Mahagonny and Happy End.
