= Ginny NiCarthy =

American writer and activist (1927–2019)

- Born: Virginia Jane McCarthy; April 30, 1927; San Francisco, California, U.S.
- Died: September 23, 2019 (aged 92)
- Education: University of Washington
- Occupations: Writer; activist; social worker
- Children: 3

Ginny NiCarthy (née Virginia Jane McCarthy, April 30, 1927 – September 23, 2019) was an American writer, activist, and social worker.

== Biography ==
Born in San Francisco to Paul McCarthy, former mayor of Redwood City, she transitioned her early ambitions from acting to social work after serving as a psychiatric aide, earning a master's from the University of Washington.

A prominent advocate, NiCarthy's causes spanned feminism, civil rights, and anti-Vietnam War. Her notable works include The Ones Who Got Away (1987), You Don't Have to Take It (1993), and Seeing for Myself (2012). She was twice married and is survived by three children and a granddaughter.

== Bibliography ==
- The Ones Who Got Away (1987)
- You Don't Have to Take It (1993)
- Seeing for Myself (2012)
