= De Munt =

De Munt is Dutch for the Mint. It can refer to:

- De Munt or La Monnaie – opera house in Brussels
- Muntplein (Munt Square), Amsterdam
  - Munttoren (Munt Tower)
  - Pathé De Munt movie theater
