= Li Ping (geologist) =

Chinese geologist and earthquake engineer (1924–2019)

- Born: March 20, 1924; Dawu County, Hubei, China
- Died: September 10, 2019 (aged 95); Beijing, China
- Education: National Central University
- Scientific career
- Fields: Earthquake
- Workplaces: Institute of Geology, China Earthquake Administration

Chinese name
- Chinese: 李玶
Transcriptions
Standard Mandarin
- Hanyu Pinyin: Lǐ Píng
- Wade–Giles: Li P'ing

Li Ping (Chinese: 李玶; 20 March 1924 – 10 September 2019) was a Chinese geologist and earthquake engineer. He was an academician of the Chinese Academy of Engineering.

== Biography ==
Li Ping was born on 20 March 1924 in Dawu County, Hubei, Republic of China. He entered National Central University in 1943, and became a faculty member after graduating in 1947.

In 1954, Li was transferred to teach at Harbin Institute of Military Engineering. After 1959, he worked at the Institute of Geology of the Chinese Academy of Sciences, which later became part of the China Earthquake Administration. He also taught as an adjunct professor at Peking University and the Graduate School of the Chinese Academy of Sciences.

Li's research focus was earthquake engineering. He conducted earthquake risk analysis for many major projects, including the Three Gorges Dam, the Daya Bay Nuclear Power Plant, the Ertan Dam, and the Danjiangkou Dam. He published over 50 academic papers, more than 10 monographs, and over 80 research reports. He won more than 10 national and ministerial science and technology awards. He was elected an academician of the Chinese Academy of Engineering in 1999.

Li died on 10 September 2019 in Beijing, aged 95.
