= Leonard Clark (explorer) =

Leonard Francis Clark (January 6, 1907, United States – May 4, 1957, Venezuela) was an American explorer, writer, and OSS colonel.

He attended the University of California, Berkeley. During the Second World War he joined the army and then the Office of Strategic Services. He flew in China behind Japanese lines, organized guerrilla activity and espionage in China and Mongolia. He attained the rank of colonel.

After the war he organized mostly one-man expeditions in Borneo, Mexico, the Celebes, Sumatra, China, Tibet, India, Japan, Central America, South America, and Burma. He died on a diamond-mining expedition in Venezuela.

Leonard Clark was the writer of a number of successful books about his expeditions.

== Works ==
- A Wanderer Till I Die
- The Marching Wind
- The Rivers Ran East
- Yucatan Adventure

== Sources ==
- Leonard Clark author profile on GoodReads
- Leonard Clark author profile on Classic Travel Books
