= Robert D. Lewis =

American politician (1931 – 2019)

Member of the New Hampshire House of Representatives from the Strafford 6th district
- In office 2008–2010

Personal details
- Born: November 10, 1931
- Died: September 15, 2019 (aged 87)
- Party: Democratic
- Education: University of New Hampshire (BA); Harvard University (MAT)

Robert David Lewis (November 10, 1931 – September 15, 2019) was an American politician. He served as a Democratic member for the Strafford 6th district of the New Hampshire House of Representatives.
