= Parvez Rob =

Bangladeshi composer and music director (died 2019)

- পারভেজ রব
- Born: 1962/63
- Died: 5 September 2019 (aged 56); Dhaka, Bangladesh
- Occupations: Composer, music director

Parvez Rob (1962/63 – 5 September 2019) was a Bangladeshi composer and music director. He was the music director of 75 films. His father Abdur Rob was an MNA in Pakistan period and his cousin Apel Mahmood is a singer and music composer.

Rob was the founding organizing secretary of Bangladesh Cultural Council. He died on 5 September 2019 at the age of 56 by road accident.
