= József Szekó =

Hungarian engineer and politician (1954–2019)

Member of the National Assembly
- In office 14 May 2010 – 5 May 2014

Personal details
- Born: 21 December 1954 Mohács, Hungary
- Died: 27 September 2019 (aged 64) Mohács, Hungary
- Party: Fidesz
- Profession: mechanical engineer, politician

József Szekó (21 December 1954 – 27 September 2019) was a Hungarian politician, member of the National Assembly (MP) from Fidesz Baranya County Regional List from 2010 to 2014. He was elected Mayor of Mohács on 18 October 1998. He served in this capacity until his death.

Szekó was appointed a member of the Committee on Local Government and Regional Development on 14 May 2010, holding the position until 5 May 2014.
