= Ji Guobiao =

Chinese chemical engineer (1932–2019)

- Born: March 1, 1932; Wuxi, Jiangsu, China
- Died: 5 September 2019 (aged 87); Beijing, China
- Education: Shanghai Jiao Tong University; Donghua University
- Scientific career
- Fields: Chemical fiber engineering
- Workplaces: Chinese Academy of Engineering (CAE)

Chinese name
- Traditional Chinese: 季國標
- Simplified Chinese: 季国标
Transcriptions
Standard Mandarin
- Hanyu Pinyin: Ji Guobiao

Ji Guobiao (Chinese: 季国标; 1 March 1932 – 5 September 2019) was a Chinese chemical engineer and an academician of the Chinese Academy of Engineering (CAE). He was a pioneer of chemical fiber engineering technology in China.

== Early life and education ==
Ji was born in Wuxi, Jiangsu, in March 1932. He studied at Donglin Academy and Furen High School. After the liberation of Shanghai in 1949, he was accepted to Shanghai Jiao Tong University, where he majored in the Department of Industrial Management and the Department of Textile Dyeing and Chemical Industry. In 1951, due to the adjustment of the faculty, he became a new transfer student at East China Institute of Textile Science and Technology (now Donghua University). During his university years, he joined the New Democratic Youth League.

== Career ==
After university, he was assigned to Qingdao Printing and Dyeing Plant (青岛印染厂). During his work, he taught himself the professional knowledge of chemical fibers. He joined the Chinese Communist Party in 1954. That same year, he was sent abroad to study at the expense of the government. After returning to China he became director of the Technical Room of Baoding Chemical Fiber Factory (保定化纤厂). In the autumn of 1958, he followed chemist Hou Debang to Japan to study fertilizer and fibre production technology. In 1963, he was transferred to Nanjing Chemical Fiber Plant (南京化纤厂) as deputy chief engineer. In 1965, he helped found the Lanzhou Chemical Fiber Plant (兰州化纤厂). He was appointed deputy chief engineer after studying synthetic fiber production technology in the United Kingdom. During the Cultural Revolution, he was denounced as a "reactionary" and was brought to be persecuted. He entered politics in 1973, when he was transferred to the Ministry of Textile Industry. In 1978, he helped found Yizheng Chemical Fiber, serving as its deputy commander and chief engineer. In 1980 he was appointed director of the Department of Chemical Fiber of the Ministry of Textile Industry. He was promoted to vice-minister in 1984. In 1994 he was elected an academician of the Chinese Academy of Engineering (CAE). In December 2003, Donghua University established the Institute of Modern Textiles, Ji became its first dean.

== Death ==
He died of laryngeal cancer in Beijing, on 5 September 2019.

== Selected papers ==
- "Die Entwicklung der Chinesischen Textile Industrie". Textile Technik. 1. German. 1988.
- "China's Man-made Fiber Industry Prospects for the year 2000". International Fiber Journal. 8. United States. 1990.
- "China's Polyester Industry". Textile Institute. United Kingdom. 1993.
- "China to Strengthen Industrial Textiles". Textile Monthly. 7. United States. 1994.
- "China intensive die Ent wicklung von Chemie faser and ihren Einsats in technischen Textilier". Chemie-faser Textile Industrie. 9. German. 1994.
- "Development of China's Acrylic Industry". Austria: 37th International Manmade Fiber Congress. 1998.
- "The Application and Prospect of Polypropylene Fiber in China". 9. 38th International Man-made Fiber Congress. 1999.
- Ji Guobiao; Shi Meiwu; Ye Guangdou (1999). "High Strength Polyvinyl Alcohol Fiber Applied in Cement and Building Materials". Chemical Fiber International. German.
- "Hochfeste PVA-Faser fur die Zementverterkung". Technische Textiler. 4. German. 1999.
- "The Man-made Fiber and Textile Industry at Milinium-Great Past and Bright Future in China". Austria: 39th International Man-made Fiber Congress. 2000.
- "Vliestoffe: Polyvinyl Alkohol Faser". German: WILEY-VCH. 2001.
- "Prospect of Advanced Fiber Material in China". Shanghai. 2002.

== Awards ==
- 2004 5th Guanghua Engineering Science and Technology Award.
