= Inder Singh (community leader) =

American activist (1932–2019)

Inder Singh (October 1, 1932 – September 27, 2019) was a writer and active community leader. Starting in his local community and later moving to the national and then to the global arena, he spent a lifetime bringing the Indian community together. He was hailed as a social entrepreneur. He helped network the global Indian Diaspora through education and outreach. He lobbied extensively for the issues faced by the Indian diaspora. He rallied the support from his community and government leaders to ensure that the Indian diaspora is well represented in their new countries.

Mr. Singh was the chairman of the Global Organization of People of Indian Origin (GOPIO). He also co-founded the Asian & Pacific American Republicans Coalition which became an officially chartered organ of the California Republican Party. In the late 1990s, he was involved with the National Asian Pacific Center on Aging. With offices in most states, the National Body of Asian Americans caters to the needs of Asian seniors. In 1981, Mr. Singh founded the Federation of Indian American Associations (FIA) of Southern California. He also co-founded the Indian Association of Los Angeles (San Fernando Valley). In 1987, Mr. Singh founded the Indian American Heritage Foundation (IAHF), a society that celebrates and honors academic excellence and achievements of children of Indian origin.

== History ==
Singh, was born October 1, 1932. He is a resident of Los Angeles, California. Singh is married, has two children, and two grandchildren. He continues his community work through GOPIO, IAHF and writing articles on the Indian Diaspora.

== Accomplishments ==
Inder Singh held these positions.

- GOPIO - Chairman, President 2004-2009
- IAHF - Chairman
- Formed the Global Punjabi Diaspora - 2001
- NFIA - Chairman - 1992-1996
- NFIA - President - 1988-1992
- National Asian Pacific Center on Aging - Board Member- 1995-2001
- India Association of Los Angeles (San Fernando Valley) - co-founder - 1999
- National Asian Pacific Center on Aging - Vice Chair - 1998-1999
- Federation of Indian American Associations of Southern California - founder - 1981
- Spearheaded the re-dedication ceremony of the Temecula post office building to Dalip Singh Saund Post Office Building
