= Denis Nsanzamahoro =

Rwandan actor and filmmaker (1976 - 2019)

- Born: Denis Nsanzamahoro; Rwanda
- Died: 5 September 2019
- Occupations: Actor and filmmaker
- Notable work: Rwasa, Amarira y’Urukundo, Sakabaka and Petit Pays

Denis Nsanzamahoro (died 5 September 2019) was a Rwandan actor and filmmaker.

== Legacy ==
He had established himself as one of the most celebrated actors that the Rwandan film industry has ever had since he launched his professional career in filmmaking in 1999, having successfully starred in popular films, from locals like Rwasa and Amarira y’Urukundo, Sakabaka among others, as well as several commercials, He was notable for movies such as 100 Days and Sometimes in April. The last film in which he starred is Petit Pays, produced by Gael Faye in June 2019.

== Death ==
He died suddenly on 5 September 2019, due to complications from diabetes.
