= Arnold R. Highfield =

American professor

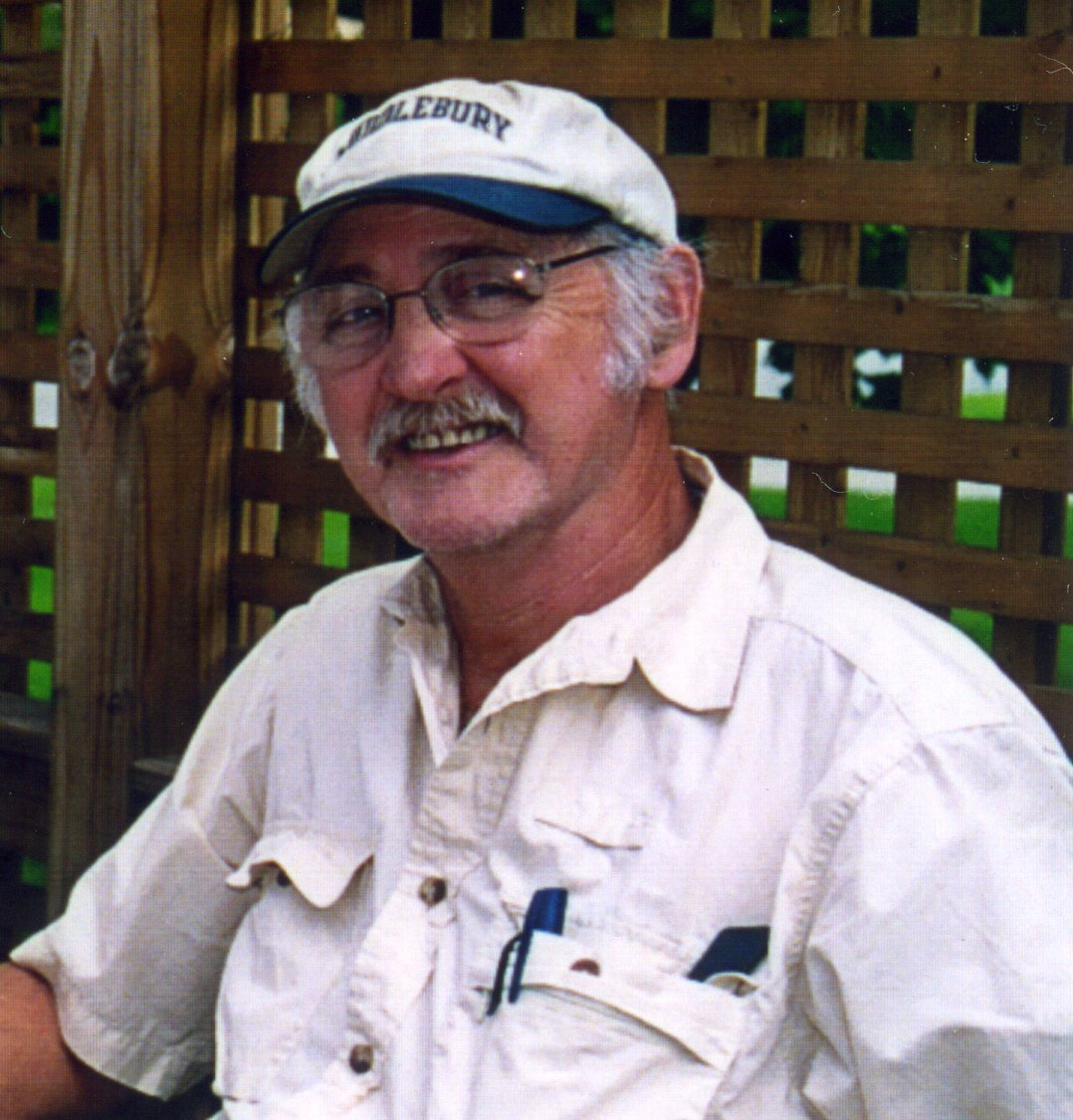
- Arnold Highfield at home in the Virgin Islands
- Born: Arnold Ray Highfield; March 10, 1940; New Boston, Ohio, U.S.
- Died: September 8, 2019 (aged 79); Middlebury, Vermont, U.S.
- Occupations: Writer; historian; linguist; poet
- Known for: Historical works on the Danish West Indies and the U.S. Virgin Islands

Arnold Ray Highfield (March 10, 1940 – September 8, 2019) was an American professor, historian, linguist, writer, and poet, best known for his historical works on the Danish West Indies and the United States Virgin Islands.

== Early life and personal life ==
Arnold Highfield, the eldest of two children, was born in New Boston, Ohio, to Arnold Ray Highfield, a steelworker, and his wife Hazel Nichols Highfield. His father died in an auto accident in November 1941; Arnold and his brother were raised by their mother and paternal grandparents, Clarence Riley Highfield and Roxie Frye Highfield. Highfield earned a BA in Social Sciences and History from Ohio State University in 1964 and an MA in [Medieval History] in 1966. In 1966–67, he attended the University of Lausanne in Switzerland, where he studied French. In 1968, he studied Spanish at the University of Madrid in Spain. In 1976, he earned a doctorate in Romance Linguistics, also from The Ohio State University.

In 1963, Highfield married Shirley de Chabert of St. Croix, USVI, whom he met while a student at The Ohio State University. In the early years of their marriage, they completed studies towards their graduate degrees in different parts of Europe. They eventually settled in St. Croix, US Virgin Islands. They have four children, Kevin D Highfield, Leslie Highfield Carter, Kimberly R Highfield and Christopher R Highfield; and four grandchildren. The couple presently divide their time between homes in La Grande Princesse, St. Croix, and Middlebury, Vermont.

Highfield died on September 8, 2019.

== Teaching career ==
Highfield began his teaching career as an assistant instructor and departmental tutor, History Department, Ohio State University, in 1964–66. He was an instructor of history at Lycée Jaccard, in Pully, Switzerland in 1966–67. In 1968, he moved to St. Croix, USVI, and was an instructor of history at the then College of the Virgin Islands from 1969 to 1972. In 1973–74, he became a teaching associate and the following year, 1974–75, he was a research associate at Ohio State University in the Department of Romance Languages. From 1976 until 2007 he taught as a professor of Social Sciences and Linguistics at the University of the Virgin Islands, St. Croix Campus. During his tenure there, he taught courses in Virgin Islands History, Caribbean History, World History, Anthropology, Linguistics and Philosophy. There he held the title of Scholar-in-Residence from 1995 until his retirement in 2007, at the University of the Virgin Islands, St. Croix Campus. Highfield has taught at several other universities, including a stint as Exchange Professor in the History Department of Ohio Wesleyan University in 1982 and a turn as visiting professor for the winter terms of both 1998 and 1999 at Middlebury College in Middlebury, Vermont. He has also lectured at a number of colleges and universities, including: The University of Puerto Rico (Rio Piedras, Puerto Rico); the University of Copenhagen (in absentia); Middlebury College; California State University; Lavity Stoutt College (Tortola, British Virgin Islands); Colegio Universitario del Turabo (Puerto Rico); West Indies Laboratory, Fairleigh Dickinson University; the Haitian-American Institute (Port-au-Prince, Haiti), The University of Galway, and others.

== Honors ==
Highfield is a past member of Phi Alpha Theta, National History Honorary Society; recipient of the Faculty of the Year Award for the St. Croix Campus, College of the Virgin Islands, for the academic years 1975–76, 1976–77, and 1977–78, as selected by the student body; Scholar-in-Residence, University of the Virgin Islands, 1995–2007; honoree as a "Virgin Islands Hero" by AT&T in 1997; recipient of the Governor's Virgin Islands Medal for Excellence in Literature in August 1997; recipient of the University of the Virgin Islands Faculty Award for Excellence in Research and Scholarship, May 1998.

== Published works ==
- Editor and Translator Georg Hjersing Høst's Account of the Island of St. Thomas and Its Governors Recorded there on the Island from 1769 until 1776 with Kristoffer F. Bøegh, published in 2018 by Antilles Press, Christiansted, USVI. ISBN 978-0-916611-25-5
- Editor and Translator Charles Vanderbourg's Report To Ernst Schimmelmann on the Present Conditions of the Negroes on the Schimmelmann Plantations and the Means of Ameliorating Them published in 2018 by Antilles Press, Christiansted, USVI. ISBN 978-0-916611-24-8
- Authored The Cultural History of the American Virgin Islands and the Danish West Indies: A Companion Guide published in 2018 by Antilles Press, Christiansted, USVI. ISBN 978-0-916611-22-4
- Authored Crucian Recollections: From the Compelling Past of a Storied Island published in 2014 by Antilles Press, Christiansted, USVI. ISBN 978-0-692-20055-1
- Authored Sainte Croix 1650–1733: A Plantation Society in the French Antilles published in 2013 by Antilles Press, Christiansted, USVI. ISBN 978-0-916611-19-4
- Authored Sea Grapes and Kennips: The Story of Christiansted Town and Its People published in 2012 by Antilles Press, Christiansted, USVI. ISBN 978-0-916611-18-7
- Authored Guide to British Documents for the Danish West Indies and the Virgin Islands During the Colonial Period, 1652 to 1739 published in 2010 by Antilles Press, Christiansted, USVI. ISBN 978-0-916611-11-8
- Authored Time Longa’ Dan Twine: Notes on the Culture, History, and People of the U.S. Virgin Islands published in 2009 by Antilles Press, Christiansted, USVI. ISBN 978-0-916611-23-1
- Co-edited Negotiating Enslavement: Perspectives on Slavery in the Danish West Indies published in 2009 by the Virgin Islands Humanities Council. ISBN 0-916611-10-8
- Authored Under a Taino Moon published in 2008 by Antilles Press, Christiansted, USVI. ISBN 978-0-916611-03-3
- Edited Hans West's Accounts of St. Croix in the West Indies published in 2004 by The Virgin Islands Humanities Council. ISBN 1-886007-05-5
- Edited Emancipation in the US Virgin Islands: 150 Years of Freedom; 1848–1998 published in 1999 by The Virgin Islands Humanities Council. ISBN 1-886007-10-1
- Edited and translated J.L. Carstens’ St. Thomas in Early Danish Times: A General Description of all the Danish, American or West Indian Islands published in 1997 by The Virgin Islands Humanities Council. ISBN 1-886007-04-7
- Edited Observations upon the state of Negro Slavery in the Island of Santa Cruz, 1829 published in 1996 by Antilles Press, Christiansted, USVI. ISBN 0-916611-17-5
- Edited and translated Description of the Island of St. Croix in America in the West Indies by Reimert Haagensen published in 1995 by The Virgin Islands Humanities Council. ISBN 1-886007-03-9
- Authored St. Croix, 1493: An Encounter of Two Worlds published in 1995 by The Virgin Islands Humanities Council. ISBN 1-886007-01-2
- Co-authored Slavery in the Danish West Indies, A Bibliography published in 1994 by The Virgin Islands Humanities Council. ISBN 0-916611-14-0
- Co-editor The Kamina Folk: Slavery and Slave Life in the Danish West Indies published in 1994 by The Virgin Islands Humanities Council, 1994, USVI. ISBN 1-886007-00-4
- Co-edited The Danish West Indian Slave Trade: Virgin Islands Perspectives published in 1994 by The Virgin Islands Humanities Council, USVI. ISBN 0-916611-15-9
- Authored An Archaeology of Names published in 1993 by Antilles Press, Christiansted, USVI. ISBN 0-916611-12-4
- Co-edited The Generall Description of America or The New World By George Gardiner of Peckham published in 1993 by Antilles Press, Christiansted, USVI. ISBN 0-916611-13-2
- Edited Bibliography of Agriculture in the U.S. Virgin Islands Including the Danish West Indies Origins to 1987 published in 1992 by the University of the Virgin Islands Cooperative Extension Service, USVI. ISBN 0-9628909-1-X
- Co-translated C.G.A. Oldendorp’s History of the Mission of the Evangelical Brethren on The Caribbean Islands of St. Thomas, St. Croix, and St. John. edited by Johann Jakob Bossard. published in 1987 by Karoma Publishers, Inc. Ann Arbor, MI. ISBN 0-89720-075-6
- Co-edited Historicity and Variation in Creole Studies published in 1981 by Karoma Publishers, Inc., Ann Arbor, MI. ISBN 978-0-89720-036-3 (cloth), 0-89720-027-3 (paper)
- Co-edited Theoretical Orientations in Creole Studies published in 1980 by Academic Press, (subsidiary of Harcourt Brace Jovanovich, Publishers, NY, London, Toronto Sydney San Francisco) ISBN 0-12-710160-8
- Authored The French Dialect of St. Thomas, United States Virgin Islands: A Descriptive Grammar with Texts and Glossary, Vols. I & II published in 1979 by Karoma Publishers, Inc., Ann Arbor, MI.
- Authored A Brief History of St. Croix published in 1973 by Carib Things Co., Christiansted, USVI. LCCN 72--88996, OCLC 43471515

== Other work ==
In the early 1980s, Highfield hosted a weekly television program called Focus on TV-Channel 8 in St. Croix that dealt with visiting personalities, cultural events, and politics. During that same period, he also wrote a weekly column for the St. Croix Avis for a period of two years, covering cultural events and topics dealing with history and society. From 2008 until 2013, he wrote a monthly article for The Crucian Trader, published by the V.I. Daily News.
