= Len Clarke (footballer, born 1905) =

Australian rules footballer, born 1905

Personal information
- Full name: Leonard Hector Clarke
- Born: 23 June 1905; Bendigo, Victoria
- Died: 26 January 1975 (aged 69); Heidelberg, Victoria
- Original team: Coburg

Playing career^{1}
Years	Club	Games (Goals)
1931	Carlton	1 (0)
- ^{1} Playing statistics correct to the end of 1931.

Leonard Hector Clarke (23 June 1905 – 26 January 1975) was an Australian rules footballer who played with Carlton in the Victorian Football League (VFL).
