= Ascención Mendieta =

Spanish activist (1925–2019)

Ascensión Mendieta
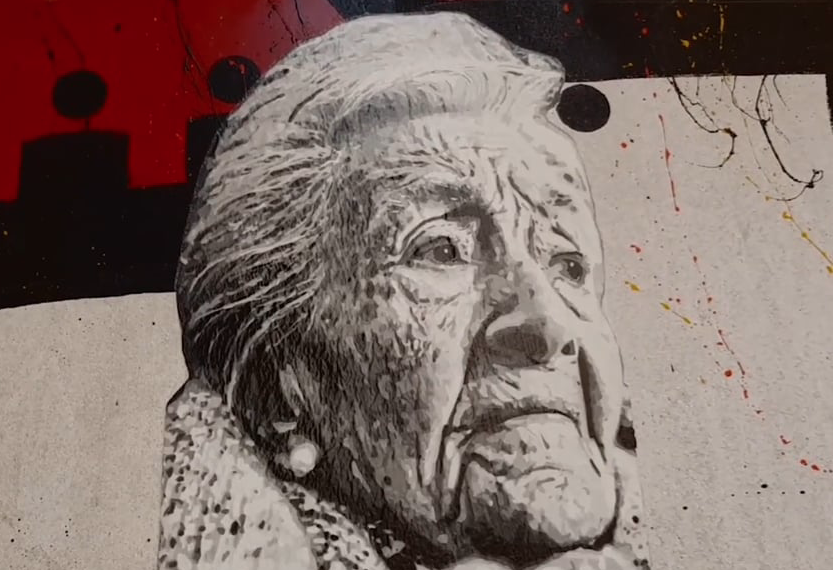
- Born: November 29, 1925; Sacedón, Castilla La Mancha, Spain
- Died: 16 September 2019 (aged 93); Madrid, Spain
- Known for: Activist for Historic Memory

Ascensión Mendieta Ibarra (29 November 1925 – 16 September 2019) was a Spanish activist for the rights of civilians killed during the Spanish Civil War. She became a symbol for anti-fascist movements – notably the Association for the Recovery of Historical Memory (ARMH) – as a result of her seventy-year struggle to recover the body of her father, Timoteo Mendieta Alcalá, and buried with twenty-three other victims in a mass grave in the cemetery of Guadalajara. Ascensión Mendieta managed to use international human rights law in the so-called "Argentine Complaint" against the crimes of Franco, finally resulting in her father's exhumation in 2017.

== Biography ==
Ascensión Mendieta was born in Sacedón, a town of Guadalajara Province, on 29 November 1925. Daughter of Timoteo Mendieta, a member of the General Workers Union (UGT), a socialist syndicate union attached to the Spanish Socialist Workers' Party (PSOE), and María Ibarra, daughter of a conservative family. They had seven children - four boys and three girls - of which Ascensión was the youngest.

Timoteo Mendieta was a butcher, but was also politically active as a member of the UGT (Worker's Union) during the Second Spanish Republic. A fascist revolution under Francisco Franco was mounted in 1936, and all members of the democratically elected Spanish government found themselves enemies of the state and subject to what has become known as the White Terror. In summer 1939, a neighbour denounced Timoteo to the authorities, and he was abducted by fascist troops/militia and executed in November 1939. His family were left destitute by his execution, and as the family of a republican were blacklisted from any support or employment opportunities. They moved to the Madrid town of Puente de Vallecas, to the house of Timoteo's mother. Ascensión married and raised a family in Madrid. The Franco dictatorship forbade any attempt to exhume the regime's murder victims, and even to question injustices brought about in its name.

After the death of Franco in 1975, Ascensión and her sister Paz began to campaign for the exhumation of her father. When Paz died, Ascensión continued her work, resulting in repeated appeals that were consistently rejected by the Spanish authorities. By then in her 80s, her campaigns finally led her to the International Court of Human Rights, based in Argentina. Despite strong opposition from pro-Franco factions in Spain, the remains of her father were successfully exhumed, identified and reburied by the ARMH and an international forensics team in 2017. Ascensión Mendieta died in 2019, and is buried alongside her father in the civil cemetery of Almudena in Madrid.
