= Joe McGhie (Australian footballer) =

Australian rules footballer (1947–2019)

Personal information
- Full name: Joseph Alfred McGhie
- Born: 28 June 1947
- Died: 9 September 2019 (aged 72)
- Height: 180 cm (5 ft 11 in)
- Weight: 73 kg (161 lb)

Playing career^{1}
Years	Club	Games (Goals)
1966–67	Footscray	11 (0)
- ^{1} Playing statistics correct to the end of 1967.

Joe McGhie (28 June 1947 – 9 September 2019) was an Australian rules footballer who played with Footscray in the Victorian Football League (VFL). His brother Robbie McGhie played football for Richmond.
