= Masroor Jahan =

Indian novelist (1938–2019)

- Born: 8 July 1938; Lucknow, United Provinces, British India
- Died: 22 September 2019 (aged 81); Lucknow, Uttar Pradesh, India
- Occupation: Writer
- Spouse: Syed Murtaza Ali Khan
- Writing career
- Pen name: Masroor Khayal
- Period: 1960–2017
- Genres: Novelist and short story writer
- Notable work: Nai Basti (New Colony) (1982)

Begum Masroor Jahan (8 July 1938 – 22 September 2019) was an Indian novelist and short-story writer in the Urdu language. For her contributions to literature, she was awarded the Uttar Pradesh Urdu Akademi Awards in 2010 and 2015, and the Hindustan Times Women's Award in 2017.

== Life ==
Masroor Jahan (née Khayal) was born in Lucknow to a literary household. Her grandfather, Mehdi Hasan Nasiri Lakhnavi, was a poet and translator, and her father, Hussein Khayal Lakhnavi, was a poet and educator. She was unable to complete her formal education. When sixteen years old, she was given in marriage to Syed Murtaza Ali Khan.

Jahan suffered several losses, including two brothers, and a son predeceased her. She died of a brain stroke in Lucknow on 22 September 2019.

== Career ==
In 1960, Masroor Khayal published her first short story, "Who Was She?" in Qaumi Aavaaz, an Urdu journal based in Lucknow. Her first novel, Decision was published in 1962 in Pakistan. She had been using various noms-de-plume, including Masroor Khayal, but thereafter adopted Masroor Jahan.

Jahan's stories appeared in several journals, including Hareem and Beesveen Saddi (Twentieth Century). Her novels formed the majority of her work, though critics have suggested that her finest creativity was in short stories.

Several of her contemporaries in Urdu literature, including Ismat Chughtai and Qurratulain Hyder, were active in the Progressive Writers' Movement. While she wrote social critiques, she did not join any literary trend.

The book that established her reputation was Taabaan (Sparkling), published in 1970. Her subsequent works became bestsellers, including Jab Gily Mit Gaey (No more complaints) and Kahan Ho Tum (Where are you?, 2012).

Jahan's works criss-crossed layers of society, from the working class to the aristocratic. Whether addressing the suppression of women under the pretext of family honour in the light of the decline of the aristocracy, or their agency in relationships, she was an acute observer of the foibles of human nature. While her cohort weighed against the perfidy of the nawabs, in several stories she presented them in a more humane light. Her short story Kunji, for instance, was a sympathetic portrayal of a homosexual attraction by a nobleman for a dancer. For progressives such as Chughtai, homosexuality was a refuge for the heroes, but in Jahan's work, social mores appear to transcend human desires. Indeed, Jahan was cautious in her portrayal of sexual and psychological problems, resisting the urge to pummel society. Ismat Chughtai appreciatively wrote of her works but criticised her female characters for not being stronger; Jahan took this advice to heart and made her subsequent characters bolder.

Jahan wrote in a sensitive fashion about the connections between her characters, but in her stories addressing the wreckage of families following the Partition of India, she was able to portray the devastation and the meaninglessness of relationships. In her later stories, she was lauded for the nuanced depiction of empathy. In Lutera, a thug kidnaps a married woman; realising she's pregnant, he lets her go. Her husband, though, remains uncaring of her medical condition. Her collection Tere Mere Dukh (Your Sorrows and Mine) was well-received for the flowering of her art in perceiving man's common heritage of pain.

Her novel Nai Basti (New Colony, 1982) was thematically quite different from the others. She had written romances but in this exemplar of social realism, she addressed the issues facing the urban poor living in illegal settlements.

Jahan wrote sixty five novels and five hundred short stories. Her writings have been translated into several languages, including Kashmiri, Malayalam, English and Punjabi.

== Selected works ==
=== Short stories ===
- Boorha Eucalyptus [The Aged Eucalyptus]. 1982.
- Naql-e- Makaani [Migration].
- Tere mere dukh [Your Sorrows and Mine]. Lucknow: Nami Press.
- Kahan ho Tum! Afsanvi Majmu'ah. 2012. ISBN 978-81-8223-951-7.
- جهاںځ, مسرور (2016). Khwab dar Khwab Safar [A Journey Dream After Dream]. Delhi. ISBN 978-9350737446.

=== Novels ===
- Faisla [Decision]. 1962.
- Shizif. 1973.
- Nai Basti [New Colony]. 1982.

== Bibliography ==
- Alavi, Shams Ur Rehman (24 September 2019). "Masroor Jahan bids adieu, literary world mourns the demise of the famed Urdu author". NewsBits.in.
- "HT Woman Awards: Pride, pain and a promise". The Hindustan Times. 15 May 2017.
- "UP Urdu Academy announces top award to Nida Fazli". Business Standard. Lucknow. 26 March 2016.
- Jaffar, Mehru (31 July 2014). "Love and longing in Lucknow's novels". Deutsche Welle.
- Jaffer, Mehru (1 June 2017). "The Talented, Lovely Women of Uttar Pradesh!". The Citizen.
- Kidwai, Shafey (9 August 2019). "On popular demand". The Hindu.
- Naeem, Raza (7 October 2019a). "Masroor Jahan: The Eucalyptus That Was Uprooted". The Wire.
- Naeem, Raza (4 October 2019b). "Farewell to Masroor Jahan and her Lucknow". The Friday Times. Archived from the original on 26 February 2021.
- Naeem, Raza (11 October 2019c). "Farewell to Masroor Jahan and her Lucknow – II". The Friday Times.
- "Awards". Urdu Akademi. Archived from the original on 25 December 2018.
- Zaidi, Ali Jawad (1988). "Urdu Scene: Balanced Growth". Indian Literature. 31 (6): 149–160. JSTOR 23336032.
