= Artie Gaffin =

American stage manager (1948–2019)

- Born: November 26, 1948
- Died: September 13, 2019 (aged 70)
- Known for: Broadway Stage Manager

Arthur Paul Gaffin, better known as Artie Gaffin, (November 26, 1948 – September 13, 2019) was an American stage manager known for his charismatic, generous, and kind work ethic.

== Early life and career ==
Artie Gaffin was born November 26, 1948, in Brooklyn, New York. His father Seth Gaffin was a shoe importer, and his mother Helen Barish was a housewife.

Artie Gaffin began his Broadway career in 1986 as an assistant stage manager on Wild Honey starring Kim Cattrall. He quickly transitioned to become the stage manager of Three Penny Opera starring Sting in 1989.

Other notable Broadway credits include Oh, Hello! on Broadway, the 2014 revival of Cabaret, Pacific Overtures, Nine, A Funny Thing Happened on the Way to the Forum, George Gershwin Alone, and Betrayal. He worked often with Stephen Sondheim, and was considered a top choice to stage manage new musicals.

During his career as a stage manager, Artie taught at the Yale School of Drama.

Artie was described as a kind and generous stage manager. He often supplied snacks and beverages for company members and gave many gifts to his casts and coworkers. His mentorship to dozens of younger stage managers was widely regarded as his greatest legacy.

== Death and legacy ==
Artie Gaffin died September 13, 2019, of an apparent heart attack. After his death on September 18, 2019, The Marquis, American Airlines, New Amsterdam, St. James and Broadhurst Theatres dimmed their lights in honor of Artie Gaffin and his contributions to Broadway.

After his death, outpourings of grief and support for Artie were shared. Broadway League president Charlotte St. Martin said the following about Artie:

"As the backbone of any production, a good stage manager must be a reliable leader, a creative problem solver, and a wise counselor. A great stage manager also has a generous spirit, a big heart, and an unshakeable commitment to the theatre. The outpouring of tributes makes it unanimous: Artie Gaffin was one of the greats. His influence and mentorship touched so many in the industry. He will be missed."

Broadway Cares/Equity Fights AIDS made a contribution in honor of Artie Gaffin to the Stage Managers' Project of the Actors' Fund.

Gaffin was survived by his long time partner Danny Baron since 1980. Baron made a $100,000 contribution to Broadway Cares/Equity Fights AIDS in Gaffin's honor on the first anniversary of his death.
