= Fan Kang =

Chinese economic historian (1924–2019)

Fan Kang (Chinese: 樊亢; May 1924 – 23 September 2019) was a Chinese economic historian. Considered a founder of world economic history in China, she was elected an honorary member of the Chinese Academy of Social Sciences.

== Biography ==
Fan Kang was born in Weihui, Henan, Republic of China in May 1924. She graduated from the Department of English of Northwest University (China) in 1946, and joined the Chinese Communist Party in August 1948.

After the founding of the People's Republic of China in 1949, the new Communist government established Renmin University of China in 1950, and Fan became a founding faculty member of the university. From 1957 to 1959, Fan studied in the Department of Economics of Moscow State University in the Soviet Union, and returned to teach economic history at Renmin University afterwards.

In 1980, Fan transferred to the Institute of World Economics and Politics of the Chinese Academy of Social Sciences (CASS), and was one of the only three scholars studying economic history at the institute at the time. She spent the remainder of her career at the institute. In 1991, she was awarded a special pension for distinguished scholars by the State Council of China. After her retirement, she was elected an honorary member of the CASS.

On 23 September 2019, Fan died at Peking Union Medical College Hospital, aged 95.

== Selected works ==
Fan is considered a founder of the field of world economic history in China. Her main works include:

- Foreign Economic History (Modern Era) 外国经济史 (近代现代), People's Publishing House, 1965 and 1990.
- A Brief Economic History of Major Capitalist Countries 主要资本主义国家经济简史, People's Publishing House, 1973 and 1997.
- The Rise and Decline of Capitalism 资本主义兴衰史, Beijing Publishing House, 1984 and 1992.
- World Economic History 世界经济史, Economic Science Press, 1991 and 1993.
