= Joan Antoni Solans Huguet =

Spanish Catalan architect (1941–2019)

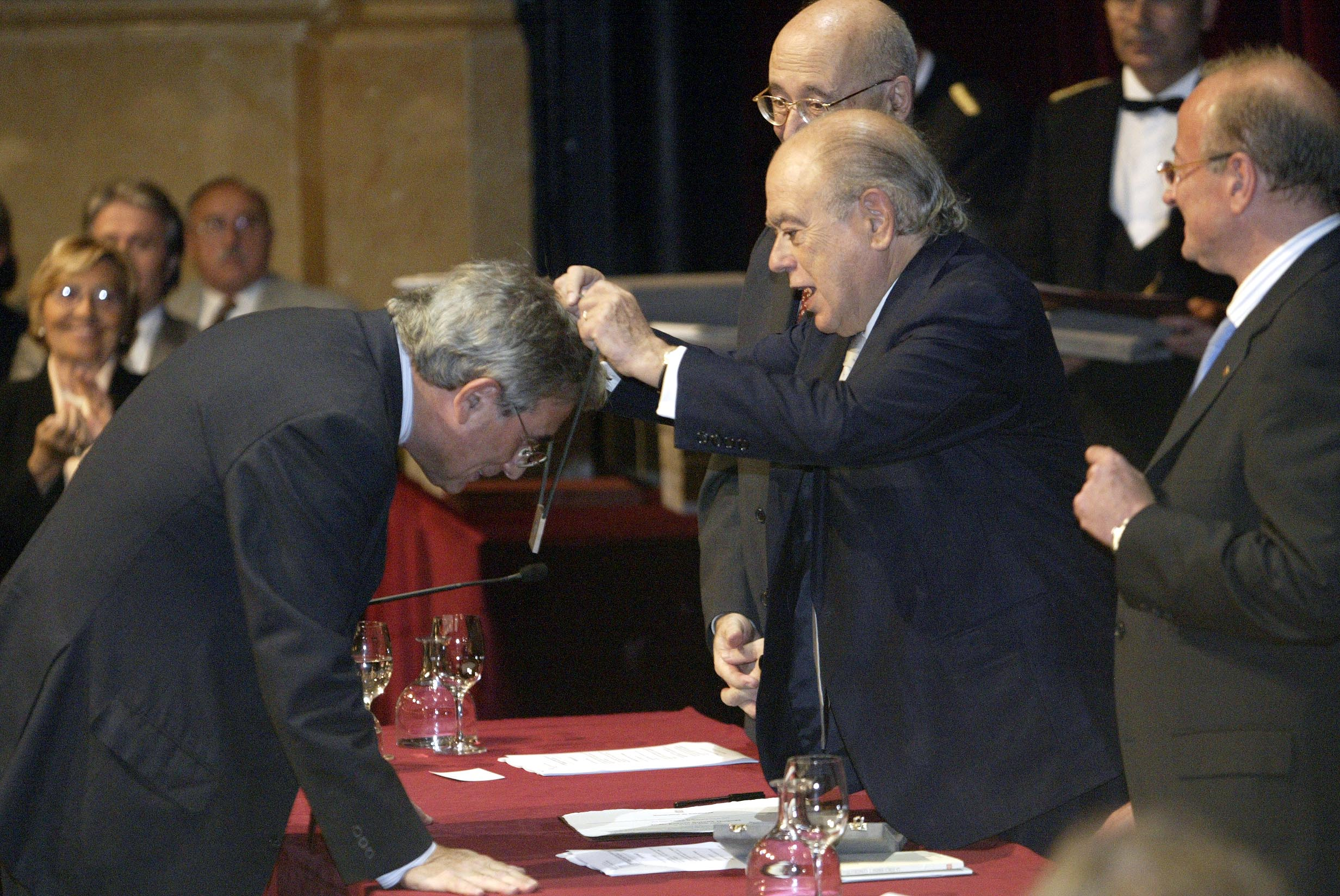
Receiving the Cross of St. George from Catalan President Jordi Pujol.

Joan Antoni Solans i Huguet (15 October 1941 – 2 September 2019) was a Spanish Catalan architect who focused his career on urban planning.

Huget graduated from the University of Barcelona in 1965. He was essentially devoted to urban planning, he was the director of the works of the General Metropolitan Plan of Barcelona, and from 1977 to 1980 he was delegate of Urban Planning Services to the City Council of Barcelona. From 1980 to 1997 he was General Director of Town Planning of the Generalitat de Catalunya during the government of Jordi Pujol and vice president of the Institut Català del Sòl between 1988 and 2000, when he resigned. He was the architect of the new territorial planning of Catalonia and some cities.

His theoretical contributions and his teaching experience have influenced subsequent generations of city planners. In 2003 he received the Cross of St. George. Since 2004 he was a member of the Reial Acadèmia Catalana de Belles Arts de Sant Jordi, being its president since 15 June 2011. Since 2005 he was a member of the Institute for Catalan Studies.

Huget died on 2 September 2019, at age 77 after being hit by a motorist in Barcelona.
