= Nana Yaa Nyamaa II =

Ghanaian royal (1955–2019)

Nana Yaa Nyamaa II (April 1955 – 13 September 2019) was a Ghanaian royal, Queen of Sunyani since 1972 until her death in 2019 at the age of 64 after a long illness.
