= Zhang Zhenxin =

Chinese businessman (1971–2019)

- Traditional Chinese: 張振新
- Simplified Chinese: 张振新
Transcriptions
Standard Mandarin
- Hanyu Pinyin: Zhāng Zhènxīn
- IPA: [ʈʂáŋ ʈʂə̂nɕín]
Yue: Cantonese
- Jyutping: Zoeng^{1} Zan^{3} San^{1}

Zhang Zhenxin (Chinese: 张振新; March 1971 – 18 September 2019) was a Chinese businessman. He founded UCF Holdings Group in 2003 and grew it into a financial conglomerate which controlled three publicly listed companies, including Chong Sing Holdings in Hong Kong. However, Chong Sing fell into debt trouble after its unsuccessful forays into peer-to-peer lending and cryptocurrencies, and the trading of its stock was suspended in July 2019. Zhang died in London two months later from alcohol-related diseases.

== Early life and education ==
Zhang was born in March 1971 in Tongliao, Inner Mongolia, China. In September 1992, he entered Dongbei University of Finance and Economics and graduated in July 1996 with a bachelor's degree in economics. He returned to the university in September 2001, as a graduate student, and earned his master's degree in economics in July 2004.

== Career ==
Zhang served as general manager of the Dalian branch of Shanghai Wanguo Securities. He founded UCF Holdings Group (先锋控股集团) in 2003, a small financial company that provided guarantees and leasing services in Dalian. The company expanded into other financial services including banking, insurance, securities, and fund management. UCF also started a financial technology company, NCF Group, which became listed on Nasdaq through a reverse merger with Hunter Maritime Acquisition Corporation, although it was later delisted from Nasdaq and traded over-the-counter.

In 2013, Zhang began acquiring shares in Credit China Holdings Limited, a company listed on the Hong Kong Stock Exchange. He later accumulated a controlling stake and renamed the company as Chong Sing Holdings Limited (中新控股). Chong Sing made a slew of acquisitions, including the peer-to-peer lender WeShare in 2016. In January 2017, it spent US$30 million to purchase a 6.4% stake in the bitcoin mining company BitFury Group.

In 2015, Zhang purchased an 80% share of the five-star Castlemartyr Resort in County Cork, Ireland, a few months after Kanye West and Kim Kardashian spent part of their honeymoon there.

UCF made headlines in early 2017 when it offered HK$7.1 billion to acquire the insurance company Hong Kong Life. However, the deal collapsed in October 2018 and UCF forfeited its HK$710 million deposit. UCF fell into debt trouble in the second half of 2018, when the Chinese government cracked down on P2P lending, and partly because of losses from its cryptocurrency investments. UCF Pay, a subsidiary of Chong Sing Holdings, was found to have embezzled client funds and had its operations suspended. The share price of Chong Sing fell by 88% in 2019, before trading was suspended in July.

== Death ==
On 18 September 2019, Zhang died at Chelsea and Westminster Hospital in London, England, aged 48. UCF did not disclose the news until 5 October, and said the reason for the delay was because the company was "going through a special period of time". The causes of his death were multiple organ failure related to alcohol dependence and pancreatitis.
