= Janet L. Mitchell =

American physician

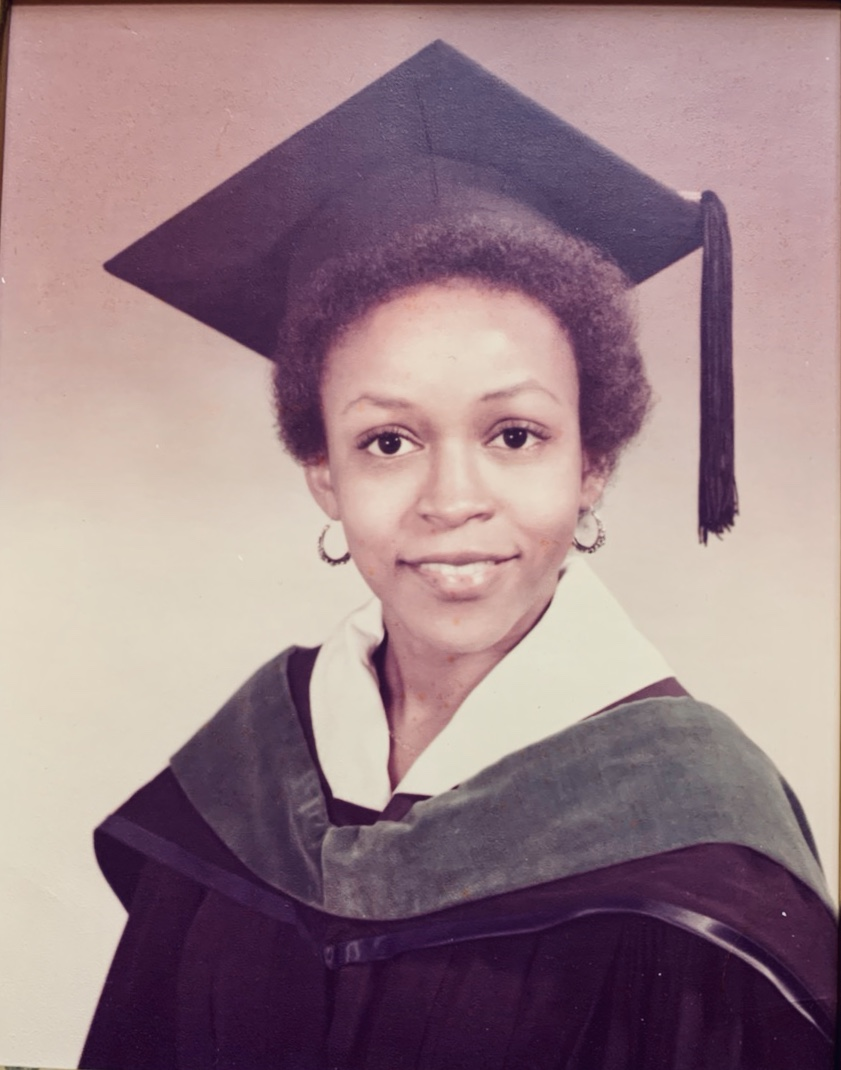
Mitchell, Howard School of Medicine graduation, May 1976

Janet L. Mitchell (March 15, 1950 - September 1, 2019) was an American physician known for her advances in perinatal HIV/AIDS treatment. During the early days of the AIDS epidemic in the U.S. Mitchell developed protocols for health treatment of pregnant women who were HIV positive or at risk for developing AIDS. She advocated against mandatory testing and testifying before Congress, she advocated in favor of an inclusive approach to health care and social services. One of her innovations derived from a study that saw a 70% decrease in HIV transmission to babies when AZT was administered to their mothers during the pregnancy.

== Early life and education ==
Janet Louise Mitchell was born in Lexington, Kentucky to Richard, a horse jockey, trainer, butler and driver and Minnie Mitchell (nee Smith). The family lived in a segregated government housing project with the children attending segregated schools for most of their childhood. Despite the limited opportunities for African-Americans and the fact that Richard, who was born an indentured servant, only had a fifth-grade education, he and his wife stressed the importance of academic achievement in the household. Subsequently, all five of their children went on to attend and graduate from university.

Mitchell attended Mount Holyoke College for her undergraduate education, graduating with a bachelor's degree in 1972. She then attended Howard University College of Medicine. While in medical school she struggled academically, almost dropping out after her first year, later discovering she had dyslexia. Mitchell sought help, continued her studies and graduated in 1976. She returned to school later in her career and earned a master's of public health at Harvard University, graduating in 1987., During this time, she was appointed in 1983 to serve on the newly formed New York State AIDS Advisory Council. She was involved in developing policy for controlling infection via procedures written for healthcare workers. Mitchell often credited her upbringing as being instrumental in her choice of career and her focus on marginalized communities, and in particular, women. In a 2003 interview with Changing the Face of Medicine, she stated, "I grew up in a government project with two wonderful parents. Working at Harlem [Hospital] and doing almost all of my rotations in medical school at [Washington] D.C. General Hospital. I said 'there but by the grace of God go I.' I have ever since devoted myself to the under-served and the most disenfranchised."

== Career ==
In 1988, Mitchell became the department head of obstetrics and gynecology at Harlem Hospital Center, a position she held until 1996. During this time, she was responsible for its perinatal drug addiction program, the largest in New York City. Mitchell cared for uninsured and HIV-positive patients. In 1994, she was commissioned to write a paper for the Institute of Medicine evaluating the disparity of inclusion of minority women in AIDS research. While she noted that all women were routinely omitted from clinical trials, she successfully argued that when women were included in studies, women of color were routinely underrepresented. Her lobbying was successful in a policy shift by the National Institutes of Health to ensure the inclusion of black women in ongoing drug trials for HIV/AIDS in pregnant women. Her research has been primarily in this area; she studied perinatal AIDS education and prevention with the Centers for Disease Control from 1988 to 1992, and pregnancy in African-American women. She served as an assistant Professor of Obstetrics and Gynecology at Columbia University and chair of the Consensus Panel at the Center of Substance Abuse within the supervision of the Department of Health and Human Services and the Public Health Service. The panel developed a Treatment Improvement Protocol in 1993 for pregnant women who were also substance abusers.

In the early days of the AIDS epidemic many programs were tried and Mitchell was often consulted to review solutions. She was called as an expert witness to testify before Congress on children and HIV infection in 1989 and again in 1990 to discuss underrepresentation of minorities and drug abusers. She and others recommended coordinated services between health care and social and psychological help as a means of stemming the epidemic. As a means of confirming this recommendation, Mitchell conducted a study from 1989 to 1992 which evaluated three separate groups of women and the way that health services and education about HIV transmission was delivered to them. Her findings concluded that risk is most successfully reduced if education is incorporated into a routine clinical program meeting the basic health needs of patients.

One of her innovations was the result of a study conducted in 1986 which administered AZT to pregnant women to reduce transmission rate to their babies. The study showed almost 70% reduction in transmission rates for women when started between 13 and 34 weeks of gestation. As a result of her study, use of AZT became the standard of care for at risk and HIV positive mothers. Mitchell kept statistics and performed maternal death reviews for New York City during her tenure at the hospital. During the decade of her employment, maternal deaths in the United States showed that for every 5,102 births, one black mother died, compared to one white mother in 18,868. Mitchell was strongly against policies of mandatory AIDS testing, believing that it was an attempt to identify a problem, rather than take action on the problem.

Mitchell has written more than fifty articles and book chapters related to her areas of specialization. She has received two major grant awards from the Centers for Disease Control, one for a perinatal HIV and Aids education and reduction demonstration project from 1988 to 1992 and the other to study pregnancy and pregnancy outcomes of African-American women in the United States from 1993 to 1997. In 1993 she chaired the consensus panel to develop the Pregnant, Substance-abusing Women, Treatment Improvement Protocol for the Substance Abuse and Mental Health Services Administration under the United States Department of Health and Human Services.

Mitchell has worked as director of outreach, chief of obstetrics, and residency director in the Department of Obstetrics and Gynecology and Reproductive Medicine at Lincoln Medical and Mental Health Center in The Bronx, New York.

== Personal life ==
Mitchell married Arthur Glass Jr. a vice president at the Jackie Robinson Foundation of New York City in 1991, but they later divorced. Mitchell developed early Alzheimer's disease and was placed in long-term care. In 2007, Mitchell was a featured subject in a Nightline program which explored the vulnerabilities of people with early onset dementia.

== Death ==
Dr. Mitchell died in Fort Collins, Colorado on September 1, 2019 from complications of Alzheimer's disease. She was 69 years old.

== Honors and awards ==
- Member, Blue Ribbon Panel of the Campaign for Women's Health (1992)
- Author, Legal and Ethical Issues relating to Inclusion of Women in Clinical Studies, National Academy of Medicine (1993)
- Award for dedicated service to African-American women, Harlem Hospital Center (1993)
- Award for service to minority communities, Black Caucus of Health Care Workers of the American Public Health Association (1993)
- Dr. Linda Laubenstein HIV Clinical Excellence Award, New York State Department of Health (1994)
- Featured physician in the National Library of Medicine exhibit "Changing the Face of Medicine: Celebrating America's Women Physicians", which travelled throughout the U.S. in 2006.
