= Len Clark (countryside campaigner) =

English civil servant (1916–2019)

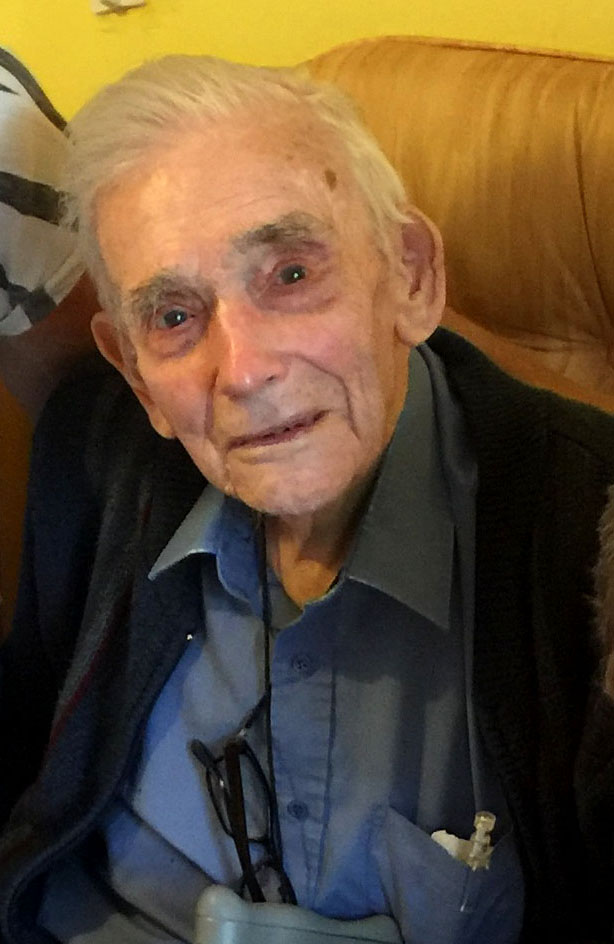
Clark in 2016, one month before his centenary.

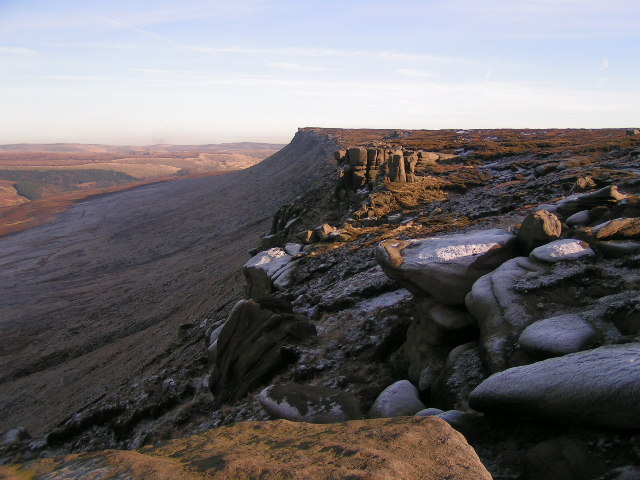
The northern edge of Kinder Scout, a high moorland landscape in the Peak District that became the first English national park in 1951. Clark advised on its purchase, citing an essential link with people in northern cities.

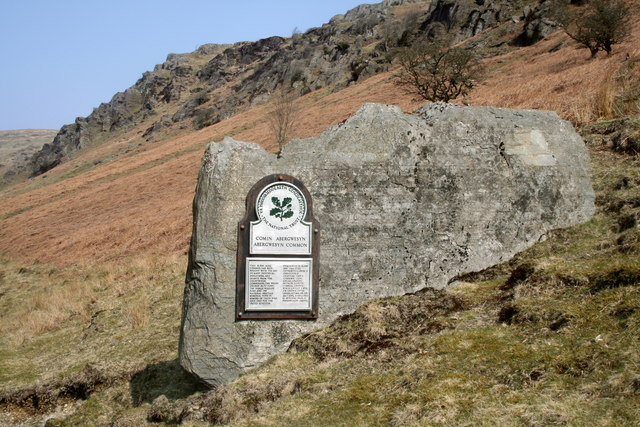
Abergwesyn Common became a National Trust property in 1984. Work goes on to conserve peatlands there.

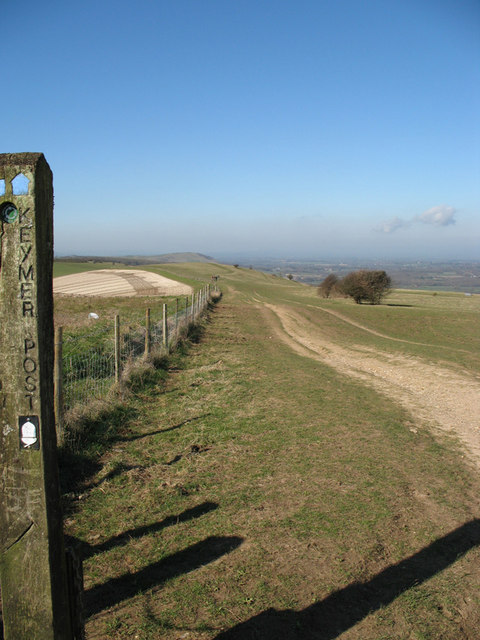
A view from the South Downs facing Clayton Hill. The South Downs and adjoining areas became a national park in 2009 after 4 decades of Clark's support.

Leonard Joseph John Clark CBE (19 August 1916 – 11 September 2019) was an English countryside campaigner and civil servant. He was the last surviving member of the committee that led to the National Parks and Countryside Act in England and Wales being passed in 1949.

== Biography ==
He was born in 1916 in Islington, London, to Edie (née Symonds) and Joseph Clark. His mother was a seamstress and his father a shop assistant. He went to Highbury Grammar School on a scholarship. An article in the News of the World encouraged his teenage interest in hiking, which he did initially in the Chiltern Hills and in Surrey. He passed the London County Council exam and began a career in local government for the Council and then the National Health Service (from which he retired in 1977 as senior administrator of the London Ambulance Service). He joined the Youth Hostel Association (YHA) in 1937. During World War II he was assigned to a non-combat role, having been refused registration as a conscientious objector; he was posted to Hereford and the Welsh capital, Cardiff, where he began a youth hostel club. He hiked in Wales and the Marches. He met a like-minded partner, Isobel Hoggan, through the YHA. On their first date, the couple watched the passage of the National Parks and Countryside Act in Parliament in 1949, on which Clark had worked. They married in 1952 and lived in Guildford and later near Godalming. Hoggan was a committed feminist; both became active Quakers and vegetarians.

Clark's passion was for the countryside. He joined the YHA executive committee in 1948; he was national treasurer and then chairman till 1963. He worked for the general public to gain access to land e.g. working for the National Trust (on the properties and executive committees for 23 years) as their YHA representative (from 1961), the Campaign for National Parks and the Open Spaces Society, the latter from 1978 as commons liaison officer and he was vice-president at the time of his death. He toured widely on his scooter to view potential acquisitions for the National Trust. He supported and argued for the Trust's founders' emphasis on protecting the landscape, rather than ownership of buildings thereon. In 1967, his tact and diplomacy avoided a schism at the Trust and he was on the committee which drove through a change to a more inclusive organisation. Through his influence, the moorland plateau of Kinder Scout in Derbyshire and the archaeological and environmental resources of the Abergwesyn Commons in Wales (which would have been planted with forest) were purchased by the Trust. After a 40-year effort, his campaign for the South Downs to become a national park was successful. He was the chair of the YHA and the National Trust's southern regional committee, voluntary director of the Samaritans in Guildford (active for three decades after his retirement), a member of the Department for Transport's advisory committee and a member of the Campaign for State Education. From 1983 to 1986, he was secretary of the Common Land Forum whose recommendations were passed to the Government. For his 100th birthday, the National Trust planted trees in his honour at its site at Polesden Lacey, Surrey. He was awarded their founders medal and was appointed a CBE for his conservation work.

His wife, Isobel, died in 2016. Clark's memoirs were published in 2018. He died in 2019, aged 103; he was survived by his sons – Alastair, Stuart, and Neil – and his grandchildren.
