= Jarrid Wilson =

American pastor and author

Personal life
- Born: September 19, 1988
- Died: September 9, 2019 (aged 30)

Religious life
- Religion: Protestant
- Church: Harvest Christian Fellowship; Highpoint Church; LifePoint Church
- Profession: Non-fiction writer

Thomas Jarrid Wilson (September 19, 1988 – September 9, 2019) was an American pastor and author.

He worked for 18 months at Harvest Christian Fellowship in Riverside, California, and he had previously pastored at Highpoint Church in Memphis, Tennessee, Home Church Nashville in Nashville, Tennessee, and at LifePoint Church in Smyrna, Tennessee. He and his wife, Juli, founded Anthem of Hope, a program for people with depression.

Wilson had two sons. He died by suicide at the age of 30 on September 9, 2019.

== Selected works ==
- Wilson, Jarrid (2012). 30 Words: A Devotional for the Rest of Us. Whitaker House. ISBN 9781577995265.
- Wilson, Jarrid (2015). Jesus Swagger. Nashville, Tennessee: Thomas Nelson. ISBN 9780718021993. OCLC 944313076.
- Wilson, Jarrid (2016). Wondrous Pursuit: Daily Encounters with an Almighty God. Kirkdale Press. ISBN 9781683590095.
- Wilson, Jarrid (2017). Love Is Oxygen: How God Can Give You Life and Change Your World. Colorado Springs, Colorado: NavPress. ISBN 9781631467608. OCLC 978286625.
