= Ibrahim Sesay (politician) =

Sierra Leonean politician (died 2019)

Ibrahim Sesay (died 19 September 2019) was a Sierra Leonean politician. He was a member of the SLPP and member of parliament as well as deputy minister of Development and Economic Planning. He was a resident of Freetown but represented the Kambia District.
