= James B. Stoltman =

American archaeologist (1935–2019)

- Born: 6 February 1935
- Died: 11 September 2019 (aged 84)
- Occupation: Archaeology professor at the University of Wisconsin-Madison

James B. Stoltman (6 February 1935 – 11 September 2019) was an American archaeologist who specialized in the American Midwest.

Stoltman was born in Minneapolis, Minnesota. He was a professor at the University of Wisconsin-Madison, where he was chairman of the anthropology department. He worked as an assistant professor from 1965 to 1970, an associate professor from 1970 to 1974, a full professor from 1974 to 1998, and a professor emeritus from 1998 to 2019.

He focused on Great Lakes archaeology and research physical ceramic analysis on material from various parts of the world. Stoltman was considered a pioneer in ceramic petrography in the US, following Anna Shepard's expertise. One of his contributions was developing a method for analyzing ceramic temper. He died in Madison, Wisconsin in 2019. The archaeology laboratory at the University of Wisconsin-Madison is named in his honor.

== Selected publications ==
- "Outline of Southeastern United States Prehistory With Particular Emphasis On the PaleoIndian Era," in The Quaternary of the United States (H. E. And David G. Frey Wright (eds.). Stephen Williams, James B. Stoltman, article authors. Princeton: Princeton University Press. 1965
- The Laurel culture in Minnesota. James B. Stoltman, Paul W. Lukens, David L. Webster. Minnesota prehistoric archaeology series, no. 8. St. Paul: Minnesota Historical Society. 1973
- "A Quantitative Approach to the Petrographic Analysis of Ceramic Thin Sections," American Antiquity, Volume 54, Issue 1 January 1989, pp. 147–160
- "Ceramic Petrography as a Technique for Documenting Cultural Interaction: An Example from the Upper Mississippi Valley," American Antiquity Volume 56, Issue 1, January 1991, pp. 103–120
- The Role of Petrography in the Study of Archaeological Ceramics. In: Goldberg P., Holliday V.T., Ferring C.R. (eds) Earth Sciences and Archaeology. Springer, Boston, MA. 2001
- "Petrographic evidence shows that pottery exchange between the Olmec and their neighbors was two-way," PNAS August 9, 2005 102 (32) 11213-11218 (James B. Stoltman, Joyce Marcus, Kent V. Flannery, James H. Burton, and Robert G. Moyle)
- Ceramic Petrography and Hopewell Interaction. The University of Alabama Press, Tuscaloosa.
- "An overview of Driftless Area prehistory." In: The Physical Geography and Geology of the Driftless Area: The Career and Contributions of James C. Knox (James B. Stoltman and Robert F. Boszhardt, authors) 2019
