= Julius H. Baggett =

American politician and lawyer (1925–2019)

Member of the South Carolina House of Representatives
- In office 1967–1968
- In office 1970–1974

Personal details
- Born: February 14, 1925 Florence, South Carolina
- Died: September 18, 2019 (aged 94) Greenwood, South Carolina
- Party: Democratic
- Occupation: lawyer

Julius H. Baggett (February 14, 1925 – September 18, 2019) was an American politician in the state of South Carolina. He served in the South Carolina House of Representatives as a member of the Democratic Party from 1967 to 1968 and from 1970 to 1974, representing McCormick County, South Carolina. He was a lawyer and retired Circuit Court judge. Baggett was an alumnus of Furman University and the University of South Carolina. He died at the age of 94 in 2019.
