= Kees Vermunt =

Dutch footballer and manager (1931–2019)

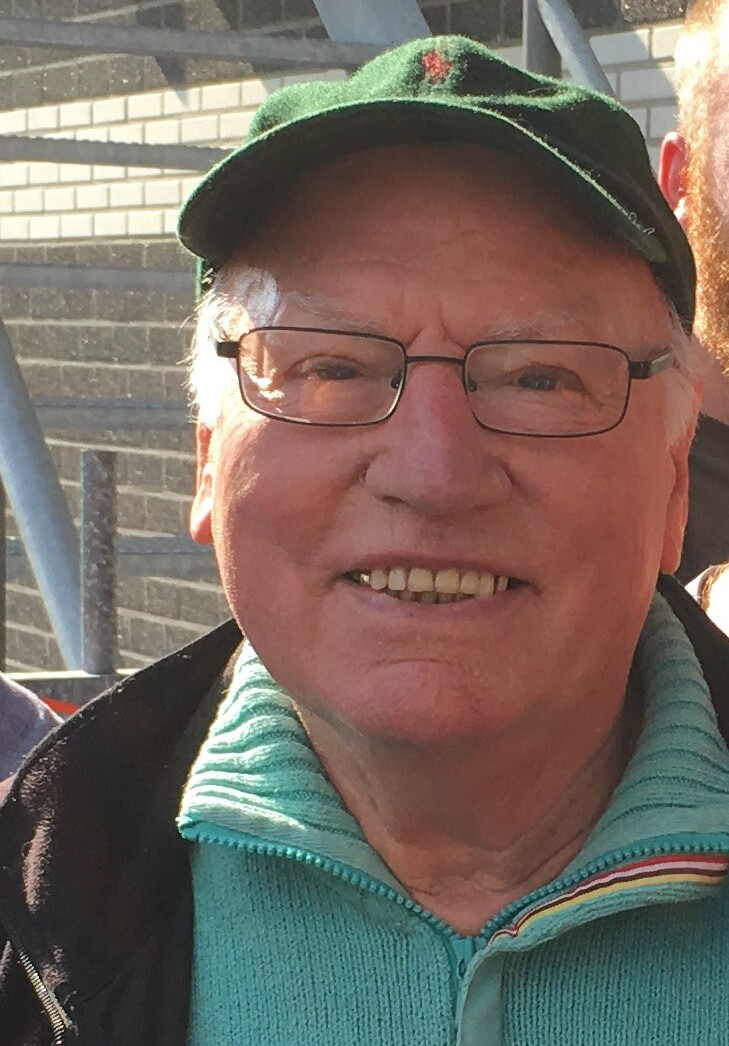
- Vermunt in 2017

Personal information
- Date of birth: 22 May 1931
- Place of birth: Roosendaal, Netherlands
- Date of death: 16 September 2019 (aged 88)
- Place of death: Rucphen, Netherlands

Senior career*
Years	Team	Apps	(Gls)
- RBC

Managerial career
- 1972–1976: RBC
- 1979: RBC
- 1983: RKC Waalwijk
- * Club domestic league appearances and goals

Kees Vermunt (22 May 1931 – 16 September 2019) was a Dutch professional football player and manager, known for his long association with RBC.
