= The Berenstain Bears Play Ball =

- Created by: Stan and Jan Berenstain
- Written by: Stan and Jan Berenstain
- Directed by: Al Kouzel
- Starring: Ron McLarty; Pat Lysinger; Knowl Johnson; Gabriela Glatzer
- Theme music composer: Elliot Lawrence
- Country of origin: United States
- Original language: English

Production
- Producer: Buzz Potamkin
- Running time: 25 minutes
- Production companies: Buzzco Associates; The Joseph Cates Company

Original release
- Network: NBC
- Release: May 6, 1983

Related
- The Berenstain Bears' Comic Valentine (1982); The Berenstain Bears (1985)

The Berenstain Bears Play Ball, also known as The Berenstain Bears' Littlest Leaguer, is a baseball-themed animated television special based on the Berenstain Bears children's book series by Stan and Jan Berenstain. Produced by Buzz Potamkin and directed by Al Kouzel, the program made its debut on NBC on May 6, 1983.

== Development ==
Stan and Jan Berenstain's first animated holiday special aired on NBC in December 1979. The Berenstain Bears' Christmas Tree was the first of five annual animated specials that would air on NBC, produced by Joe Cates and the Joseph Cates Production Company. The Berenstain Bears Meet Bigpaw was the second in this series, followed by the third, The Berenstain Bears' Easter Surprise, and a fourth The Berenstain Bears' Comic Valentine.

The Berenstains utilized rhyming couplets in the script - for both the narrator and the character dialogue. This element had also been used in the Christmas Tree special and was familiar to audiences since a similar type of writing was used in the Berenstain Bears Beginner Books series.

== Cast ==
- Ron McLarty as Papa Bear and the Narrator
- Pat Lysinger as Mama Bear
- Knowl Johnson as Brother Bear
- Gabriela Glatzer as Sister Bear

== Production and casting ==
The 25-minute special was created and written by Stan and Jan Berenstain and featured original music composed and conducted by Emmy-winning musician Elliot Lawrence, with lyrics provided by Stan Berenstain. The score included three original songs.

It was the last of five Berenstain Bears animated specials that aired on NBC from 1979 to 1983. Some of the production staff would continue to work on the next adaptation: 1985's The Berenstain Bears Show, including Joe Cates and Buzz Potamkin. Elliott Lawrence continues to score music for the episodes which are based on his compositions from the five specials, although in faster pace. While they no longer break out in song, the theme music (matching part of Stars and Stripes Forever) resembles the song lyrics from the specials. The program is now produced by Southern Star with new voice actors.

== Premiere ==
The program premiered on NBC on May 6, 1983.

== Plot ==
Papa Bear learns from the newspaper about Little League baseball tryouts taking place in Bear Country. Elated at the idea of Brother Bear becoming a baseball star, Papa enrolls Brother in the tryouts and pressures him to master the game quickly despite Brother's indifference towards Little League. By contrast, Sister shows clear talent and passion for the game but is overlooked by Papa, who insists she should focus on activities typical of girls her age. Even Mama, who is supportive of Sister's interest in the game, laments that girls not being allowed to play baseball is "the way it's always been". Defiant towards this idea, Sister continues to display great interest in baseball.

While Papa tries to teach Brother a baseball lesson, Brother’s friends invite him to go play with them in the woods. A suspicious Papa secretly follows Brother into the woods, where it is revealed that Brother, his friends, and several other cubs who were in line for the Little League tryouts, are playing their own baseball game solely for fun. Papa realizes that he had been focusing too much on competition and helps train Brother and the cubs without the pressure he had put on Brother. Papa also allows Sister to join the practice sessions, where she turns out to be an excellent player.

== Book adaptation ==
The Berenstain Bears Play Ball was published by Scholastic in 1998. The plot of the book closely follows that of the animated special.

== Home media releases ==
In 1984, Embassy Home Entertainment released the special on LaserDisc as a double-feature with The Berenstain Bears' Christmas Tree, called "A Berenstain Bears Celebration". In 1987, the special was made available on VHS by Embassy Home Entertainment as part of their "Children's Treasures" series. In 1990, the special was released on VHS by Kids Klassics. The special was re-released in 1992 by GoodTimes Home Video, in a double-feature with The Berenstain Bears' Christmas Tree. In 2002, the special was released on DVD by GoodTimes, also in a double-feature with The Berenstain Bears' Christmas Tree. In 2008, Sony Wonder also released the special on DVD. In this edition, it was bundled with a few bonus episodes from the 1980s cartoon series.
