= The Berenstain Bears' Comic Valentine =

- Created by: Stan and Jan Berenstain
- Written by: Stan and Jan Berenstain
- Directed by: Mordicai Gerstein; Al Kouzel
- Starring: Ron McLarty; Pat Lysinger; Knowl Johnson; Gabriela Glatzer; Jerry Sroka
- Theme music composer: Elliot Lawrence
- Country of origin: United States
- Original language: English

Production
- Producer: Buzz Potamkin
- Running time: 25 minutes
- Production companies: Perpetual Motion Pictures; The Joseph Cates Company

Original release
- Network: NBC
- Release: February 13, 1982

Related
- The Berenstain Bears' Easter Surprise (1981); The Berenstain Bears Play Ball (1983)

The Berenstain Bears Comic Valentine is a Valentine-themed animated television special based on the Berenstain Bears children's book series by Stan and Jan Berenstain. Produced by Buzz Potamkin and directed by Mordicai Gerstein and Al Kouzel, the program made its debut on NBC on February 13, 1982.

== Development ==
Stan and Jan Berenstain's first animated holiday special aired on NBC in December 1979. The Berenstain Bears' Christmas Tree was the first of five annual animated specials that would air on NBC, produced by Joe Cates and the Joseph Cates Production Company. The Berenstain Bears Meet Bigpaw was the second in this series, followed by the third special The Berenstain Bears' Easter Surprise.

The Berenstains utilized rhyming couplets in the script - for both the narrator and the character dialogue. This element had also been used in the Christmas special and was familiar to audiences since a similar type of writing was used in the Berenstain Bears Beginner Books series.

== Cast ==
- Ron McLarty as Papa Bear, Bigpaw and the Narrator
- Pat Lysinger as Mama Bear and Bertha Bear
- Knowl Johnson as Brother Bear
- Gabriela Glatzer as Sister Bear, Charlene, Honey Bear, Cheerleaders
- Jerry Sroka as Bearcaster

== Production and casting ==
The 25-minute special was created and written by Stan and Jan Berenstain and featured original music composed and conducted by Emmy-winning musician Elliot Lawrence, with lyrics provided by Stan Berenstain. The score included three original songs.

It was the fourth of five Berenstain Bears animated specials that aired on NBC from 1979 to 1983.

== Premiere ==
The program premiered on NBC on February 13, 1982.

== Plot ==
Brother Bear is surprised to find a Valentine addressed to him from a secret admirer by the name of Honey Bear, leaving him to wonder who his admirer is.

Adding to Brother's stress is the hockey championship; a game is scheduled to determine if his team, the Bear Country Cousins, will go on to a Valentine's Day championship game against their rivals, the fearsome Beartown Bullies. Brother leads the Cousins to victory, earning their place in the championship. Afterwards, Brother becomes infatuated with a bear named Charlene. Brother returns home to find another Valentine from Honey Bear, hoping that Charlene is the true identity of his secret admirer.

Sister Bear notices Brother's card and teases him about it. Brother scoffs at the idea of romance despite Sister's love of the holiday. He goes to scout out the training Bullies in a nearby hockey rink but is caught and intimidated into leaving, particularly by their imposing goalie; and finds a third Valentine that he once again believes is from Charlene.

Meanwhile, after being reminded of the holiday's approach, Papa Bear sets out to build the biggest, best Valentine he can gift Mama Bear. After several harebrained attempts to build an extravagant Valentine, Papa is found by Mama and assured that he doesn’t have to build something so huge to show his love for her.

On Valentine's Day, bears from far and wide gather for the championship game between the Cousins and the Bullies, including Bigpaw, who has been invited by Sister. Brother finds a final Valentine from Honey Bear promising to reveal themselves that afternoon, and becomes too distracted to play with the required aggression. The Cousins look to be routed by the Bullies with Brother unable to break through the Bullies' goalie's defense and growing tired. Brother witnesses Charlene ditching her Cousins flag to cheer for the Bullies instead, enraging Brother who finally finds the spirit to turn the tide and win the game for the Cousins.

In the aftermath, Brother is shocked when the goalie for the Bullies reveals themself to be the true identity of Honey Bear, revealing she admires Brother for his prowess at hockey and wants to train with him. Brother accepts, and Honey Bear also introduces Bigpaw to her hulking older sister Bertha, with the two giants forming a bond of friendship. The Bear family, Honey Bear, Bertha, and Bigpaw skate together to celebrate their new bonds of friendship.

== Home media releases ==
In 1984, Embassy Home Entertainment released the special on LaserDisc as a double-feature with The Berenstain Bears' Christmas Tree, called A Berenstain Bears Celebration. In 1987, the special was made available on VHS by Embassy Home Entertainment as part of their "Children's Treasures" series. In 1989, the special was distributed on VHS by Kids Klassics. The special was re-released in 1992 by GoodTimes Home Video, in a double-feature with The Berenstain Bears' Christmas Tree. In 2002, the special was released on DVD by GoodTimes, also in a double-feature with The Berenstain Bears' Christmas Tree. In 2008, Sony Wonder also released the special on DVD. In this edition, it was bundled with a few bonus episodes from the 1980s cartoon series.
