= Buzzco Associates =

Animation studio founded in 1968

Buzzco Associates, Inc.
- Formerly: Perpetual Motion Pictures (1968–1982); Perpetual Animation (1982–1984); Buzzco Productions, Inc. (1982–1984); Buzzco Associates, Inc. (1985 to present)
- Type: Private
- Industry: Animated commercials and short films
- Founded: 1968
- Founder: Buzz Potamkin; Hal Silvermintz
- Headquarters: New York City, New York, U.S.
- Key people: Candy Kugel; Marilyn Kraemer
- Website: buzzco.nyc

Buzzco Associates, Inc. is an animation studio that was founded in 1985 as an offshoot of Perpetual Motion Pictures and Buzzco Productions (as Perpetual Motion Pictures) by Buzz Potamkin with Emmy Award winner, Candy Kugel and Vincent Cafarelli as co-creative directors and Marilyn Kraemer as executive producer. Buzzco Associates is the longest continually operating animation studio in New York's history.

== History ==
Buzzco Associates, Inc., traces its lineage to Perpetual Motion Pictures, founded in 1968 by Buzz Potamkin and Hal Silvermintz. Early work of Buzzco included the "I Want My MTV" campaign, and the "Top of the Hour" network ID for Paramount's MTV. The spots mixed live action with rock stars along music and animation. In 1982, Perpetual Motion Pictures split into Perpetual Animation and Buzzco Productions, Inc., and Vincent Cafarelli and Candy Kugel joined Buzzco. Potamkin left New York in 1984 to form Southern Star Productions in Los Angeles. As part of the continuing partners' agreement in forming Buzzco Associates, Cafarelli, Kugel and Kraemer decided it was important for them to make independent films.

Buzzco continued with production of commercials, titles, insert programming, sales films and segments for such clients as Nickelodeon, Sesame Workshop, MTV, HBO Family and ABC, as well as for educational shows such as PBS's Sesame Street, Between the Lions and Square One Television. Commercial clients often come to Buzzco because of its ability to integrate different print styles into motion. They have often worked with humorous illustrator Norm Bendell, a designer of commercials for First Morris Bank and the flea-control program CIBA.

Talking About Sex: A Guide for Families, created and produced for Planned Parenthood, won the Educational Film Award at the Annecy International Animation Film Festival in 1997.

It's Still Me: A Guide for People with Aphasia & Their Loved Ones, a 17-minute film from 2009, explains aphasia and offers ways of communicating without words. It was inspired by Kugel's mother, who was aphasic for twelve years after a massive stroke.

== Filmography ==
Title	Year(s)	Notes	Client
Scratch Harry	1969	animation	Cannon Film Distributors
Weekend	1974–1979	animated sequences	NBC
The Berenstain Bears' Christmas Tree	1979	TV special	Joseph Cates Company
The Dough Nuts	1980–1981	interstitial series	Greengrass Productions
The Berenstain Bears Meet Bigpaw	1980	TV special	Joseph Cates Company
Strawberry Shortcake in Big Apple City	1981	TV special	Muller Rosen Productions
The Berenstain Bears' Easter Surprise	1981	TV special	Joseph Cates Company
The Berenstain Bears' Comic Valentine	1982	TV special	Joseph Cates Company
Willie Survive	1982	interstitial series	Greengrass/Olin/Lawrence Productions
USA Cartoon Express	1982–1991	openings and bumpers	USA Network
Calliope	1982–1983	animation	USA Network
The Berenstain Bears Play Ball	1983	TV special	Joseph Cates Company
Playboy's Hot Rocks	1983	graphics	The Playboy Channel
Deck the Halls with Wacky Walls	1983	TV special	NBC
Computer Critters	1984	interstitial series	ABC
Zack Of All Trades	1984	interstitial series	ABC
Sunday Showdown	1984	opening titles	USA Network
Teen Wolf	1986	opening and end credits	Southern Star Productions
Munchies	1987	title sequence	New Concorde
ABC Fun Facts	1988–1989	interstitial series	ABC
Sesame Street	1988–1991; 2005	animated sequences	Sesame Workshop
Playboy Late Night	1992	animation	Playboy TV
Square One Television	1992	"The Further Adventures of Zook & Alison"	Children's Television Workshop
Sports Illustrated for Kids: TV Sports Quiz	1993	Buzz Beamer animation	HBO
Money Made Easy: The ABC Kids' Guide to Dollars and Sense	1994	animation	Greengrass Productions
Square One TV Math Talk	1995–1996	animation	Children's Television Workshop
Talking About Sex: A Guide for Families	1996	direct-to-video	Planned Parenthood Federation of America, Inc.
AGTV	1998	opening, closing and bumpers	American Girl
Nick Jr. Show and Tell	1998	interstitial series	Nick Jr. Channel
Elmo's World	2001	"Birthdays, Games, & More!" segue sequences	Sesame Workshop
Maya & Miguel	2004–2007	creative checking	Scholastic
Between the Lions	2006–2010	animation	WGBH/Sirius Thinking
Schoolhouse Rock: Earth	2009	"The Rainforest"	ABC
TED-Ed	2012–2013	seven videos	TED

=== Short films ===
- Woman: Who Is Me? (1976)
- Inbetweening America (1977)
- Confessions of a Starmaker (technical assistance, 1978)
- So What If It Rains? (1979) (animation; produced by Manno Productions and Alternate Choice)
- Audition (1980)
- My Film, My Film, My Film (1983)
- A Warm Reception in L.A. (1987)
- Animated Self-Portrait (1988)
- Snowie and the Seven Dorps (1990)
- Fast Food Matador (1991)
- We Love It (1992)
- The Ballad of Archie Foley (1995)
- KnitWits (1997)
- KnitWits Revisited (1999)
- Life: A New York Ani-Jam (animated contribution, 1999)
- (it was . . .) Nothing At All (2000)
- Piscis (2001)
- Juan Bobo's Birthday Party (2002)
- Command-Z (2005)
- What I Want (music video, 2005)
- Right (2007)
- dEVOLUTION (2008)
- It's Still Me! A Guide For People With Aphasia & Their Loved Ones (2009)
- The Last Time (2012)
- iHeed: Two Simple Ways To Treat Water (2012)
- iHeed: Access to Family Planning is a Human Right (2013)
- Blessings of the Season (2013)
- My Depression (The Up and Down and Up of It) (2014) (animation)
- Vashti (2018)
- I, Candy (2018)

=== Commercials ===
- 3M (1970s)
- American Academy of Pediatrics (1984, 1988)
- American Eagle (1986)
- AnMed Health Medical Center (2003)
- Beau Rivage Casino (2014)
- Bell South (2005)
- Big Bear Supermarkets
- Budget Gourmet (1988)
- Burger King
- CBS (1970s)
- CD 101.9 (1990)
- Cheerios
- Chef Boyardee (1991)
- Chex
- CIBA
- Clearblue Easy (1991)
- The Comedy Channel (1990)
- Connecticut Academy for Education (1993)
- Cosequin (2017)
- Dan-E (2011)
- Diaperene
- Dr. Scholl's (1989)
- FirstBank (1980)
- First Morris Banks
- Fritos (1970s)
- GCI (2000)
- Hawaiian Punch
- HBO (1985)
- HBO Family (2001)
- K-Lite (1989)
- King Features (1982)
- KPPL (1982)
- McGraw-Hill
- MONY (1984)
- The Movie Channel (1987)
- MTV (1981–1984)
- National Science Foundation (1988)
- Nickelodeon (1985, 1998)
- Nick Jr. Channel (2001)
- Ohio Bell (1970s)
- Pinnacle (2000)
- Prell (1981)
- Safelite (2013)
- Salem (1981)
- See 'n Say (2001)
- Skittles (1981)
- Southwestern Bell (1993)
- Sunkist (1990)
- Underalls (1982)
- USA Network (1988)
- Tyco Toys (1999)
- VH-1 (1984–1985)
- Visa (2005)
- The Wall Street Journal
- Welch's (1990; featuring Tom and Jerry)
- WESC (1982)
- WPIX (1984)
- Xerox
- Zoombezi Bay (2014)

Commissioned short films

- ActMedia
- Balloon Museum
- CIBA
- Hewitt Associates, Inc.
- MacMillan Cancer Care
- NexView
- Xerox
