= The Berenstain Bears' Easter Surprise =

1981 animated TV special

- Created by: Stan and Jan Berenstain
- Written by: Stan and Jan Berenstain
- Directed by: Mordicai Gerstein; Al Kouzel
- Starring: Ron McLarty; Pat Lysinger; Bob McFadden; Knowl Johnson; Zachary Danziger
- Theme music composer: Elliot Lawrence
- Country of origin: United States
- Original language: English

Production
- Producers: Buzz Potamkin; Hal Hoffer
- Running time: 25 minutes
- Production companies: Perpetual Motion Pictures; The Joseph Cates Company

Original release
- Network: NBC
- Release: April 14, 1981

Related
- The Berenstain Bears Meet Bigpaw (1980); The Berenstain Bears' Comic Valentine (1982)

The Berenstain Bears' Easter Surprise is an Easter-themed animated television special based on the Berenstain Bears children's book series by Stan and Jan Berenstain. Produced by Buzz Potamkin and Hal Hoffer, and directed by Mordicai Gerstein and Al Kouzel, the program made its debut on NBC on April 14, 1981.

== Development ==
Stan and Jan Berenstain's first animated holiday special aired on NBC in December 1979. The Berenstain Bears' Christmas Tree was the first of five annual animated specials that would air on NBC, produced by Joe Cates and the Joseph Cates Production Company. The Berenstain Bears Meet Bigpaw was the second in this series.

The Berenstains utilized rhyming couplets in the script - for both the narrator and the character dialogue. This element had also been used in the Christmas Tree special and was familiar to audiences since a similar type of writing was used in the Berenstain Bears Beginner Books series.

== Plot ==
The story starts with Papa, Mama, Brother, and Sister Bear going on a picnic before the clock rewinds itself to a time when Sister wasn't born yet and Brother was the only cub of the Bear Family and on the block (referring to The Berenstain Bears' New Baby). During fall, when he isn't playing with his friends down by the bog, he enjoys asking Papa different questions about life. Papa, although he has no idea how to answer most of his son's questions, plays along anyway. As fall transitions to winter, the cycle of questions continues.

During the long cold winter, no one has any explanation for why it doesn't seem (to want) to end. Both Mama and Papa are especially anxious for spring, as they had a special Easter surprise planned, which neither of them care to disclose (although Brother Bear does notice that he can't sit on Mama's lap anymore, and it's not simply because he's getting bigger or taller). When Brother asks about Easter, Papa tells him all about candy and the Easter Bunny, but Mama sings about new life and miracles.

The family decides to pay Boss Bunny, Bear Country's official Easter Bunny responsible for the beginning of spring, a visit. However, to their shock, they find out that he has quit. Papa, while initially just as depressed as Brother is about the loss of Easter, decides to be the Easter Bunny ("I'll Be the Easter Bunny/If You Want Something Done, Then Do it Yourself") and create his own candy and egg factory, but it ultimately ends in disaster.

Brother eventually decides to take matters into his own hands and begins a search to find Boss Bunny on his own. He encounters his friend Bill Bunny, who turns out to be Boss Bunny's son. Bill takes him to a hidden spot no bear has ever been before, and the two then enter the abandoned and dilapidated Easter Factory and find Boss Bunny who is asleep. They ask him to resume his duties of bringing spring and Easter back, but he complains that the workload and responsibility of transitioning the seasons has become too much for him to handle in his old age, and he is simply too burnt out to continue. Despite Brother's pleading, Boss refuses to reconsider until he sees the Great Spring Rainbow, which relieves his ailments, revives his energy, and immediately puts his factory back in business.

On Easter morning, Brother finds his Easter candy, but Mama has an additional Easter surprise for him: Baby Sister Bear. When Brother asks where she came from, Papa is left speechless, but Mama reminds Brother about the miracle of new life (and Brother quickly notices that he can sit on Mama's lap again).

== Cast ==
- Ron McLarty as Papa Bear and the Narrator
- Pat Lysinger as Mama Bear
- Bob McFadden as Boss Bunny
- Knowl Johnson as Brother Bear
- Zachary Danziger as Bill Bunny

== Production and casting ==
The 25-minute special was created and written by Stan and Jan Berenstain and featured original music composed and conducted by Emmy-winning musician Elliot Lawrence, with lyrics provided by Stan Berenstain. The score included three original songs. The Berenstain Bears' Easter Surprise is the only one of the five specials in which Sister Bear's voice actress Gabriela Glatzer does not voice Sister Bear. However, this special featured the debut of Sister Bear in a silent cameo as a baby towards the conclusion of the film.

It was the third of five Berenstain Bears animated specials that aired on NBC from 1979 to 1983.

== Home media releases ==
In 1984, Embassy Home Entertainment released the special on LaserDisc as a double-feature with The Berenstain Bears' Christmas Tree, called "A Berenstain Bears Celebration". In 1987, the special was made available on VHS by Embassy Home Entertainment as part of their "Children's Treasures" series. In 1989, the special was distributed on VHS by Kids Klassics. The special was re-released in 1992 by GoodTimes Home Video, in a double-feature with The Berenstain Bears' Christmas Tree. In 2002, the special was released on DVD by GoodTimes, also in a double-feature with The Berenstain Bears' Christmas Tree. In 2008, Sony Wonder also released the special on DVD. In this edition, it was bundled with a few bonus episodes from the 1980s cartoon series.

== See also ==
- List of Easter television episodes
