= Berenstain Bears (disambiguation) =

The Berenstain Bears is a series of children's books created by Stan and Jan Berenstain.

Berenstain Bears may also refer to:

- The Berenstain Bears (1985 TV series), an Australian-American animated television series based on the book series
- The Berenstain Bears (2002 TV series), a Canadian animated television series based on the book series

== See also ==
- List of Berenstain Bears books
