= List of Berenstain Bears books =

This list of Berenstain Bears books includes many in the picture book series (such as "Beginner Books" and "First Time Books") and the illustrated children's novels, such as those in the "Big Chapter Books" series. Since the first Berenstain Bears installment was published in 1962, the series has sold close to 260 million copies.

In addition to writing children's literature, the authors Stan and Jan Berenstain also wrote three books that feature the Berenstain Bears: two parenting books, What Your Parents Never Told You About Being a Mom or Dad (1995) and The Berenstain Bears and the Bear Essentials (2005), and their autobiography, Down a Sunny Dirt Road (2002).

== Publication summary ==
Titles marked with an asterisk (*) were adapted into episodes of the 1985 TV series.

Titles marked with two asterisks (**) were adapted into episodes of the 2002 TV series.

Title	Year	Publisher	Notes/Series
The Big Honey Hunt	1962	Random House	Beginner Books
The Bike Lesson: Another Adventure of the Berenstain Bears (later published simply as The Bike Lesson)	1964	Random House	Beginner Books
The Bears' Picnic: A Sequel to The Big Honey Hunt (later published as The Bears' Picnic)	1966	Random House	Beginner Books
The Bear Scouts	1967	Random House	Beginner Books
The Bears' Vacation	1968	Random House	Beginner Books
Inside, Outside, Upside Down	1968	Random House	Bright & Early
Bears on Wheels	1969	Random House	Bright & Early/Step-into-Reading
The Bears' Christmas	1970	Random House	Beginner Books
Old Hat, New Hat	1970	Random House	Bright & Early
The B Book	1971	Random House	Bright & Early
Bears in the Night	1971	Random House	Bright & Early
C Is for Clown (later published as The C Book)	1972	Random House	Bright & Early
The Berenstain Bears' Nursery Tales	1973	Random House	Pictureback
The Bears' Almanac	1973	Random House	Bear Facts Library/Beginner Books
The Berenstain Bears' New Baby	1974	Random House	Pictureback/First Time Books
He Bear, She Bear	1974	Random House	Bright & Early
The Bear Detectives*	1975	Random House	Beginner Books
The Bears' Nature Guide	1975	Random House	Bear Facts Library
The Berenstain Bears' Counting Book	1976	Random House	Board Book
The Berenstain Bears' Science Fair	1977	Random House	Bear Facts Library
The Spooky Old Tree	1978	Random House	Bright & Early
The Berenstain Bears Go to School**	1978	Random House	Pictureback/First Time Books
Papa's Pizza: A Berenstain Bear Sniffy Book**	1978	Random House	—
The Berenstain Bears and the Missing Dinosaur Bone*	1980	Random House	Beginner Books
The Berenstain Bears and the Mysterious Numbers	1980	Fisher Price	Talk-to-Me
The Berenstain Bears' Christmas Tree	1980	Random House	—
The Berenstain Bears Go to the Doctor**	1981	Random House	First Time Books
The Berenstain Bears and the Sitter**	1981	Random House	First Time Books
The Berenstain Bears' Moving Day**	1981	Random House	First Time Books
The Berenstain Bears Visit the Dentist**	1981	Random House	First Time Books
The Berenstain Bears: How to Get Along With Your Fellow Bear	1982	Kidstuff/IJE	Book and audio
The Berenstain Bears Get in a Fight*	1982	Random House	First Time Books
The Berenstain Bears Go to Camp**	1982	Random House	First Time Books
The Berenstain Bears in the Dark*	1982	Random House	First Time Books
The Berenstain Bears' Storybook Treehouse	1982	Random House	—
The Berenstain Bears and the Messy Room*	1983	Random House	First Time Books
The Berenstain Bears and the Truth*	1983	Random House	First Time Books
The Berenstain Bears and the Wild, Wild Honey*	1983	Random House	Mini-storybook
The Berenstain Bears Go Fly a Kite*	1983	Random House	Mini-storybook
The Berenstain Bears' Soccer Star*	1983	Random House	Mini-storybook
The Berenstain Bears to the Rescue*	1983	Random House	Mini-storybook
The Berenstain Bears and the Trouble with Money**	1983	Random House	First Time Books
The Berenstain Bears' Olympics	1983	Texas Instruments	Magic Wand Speaking Books
The Berenstain Bears On the Job**	1983	Texas Instruments	Magic Wand Speaking Books
Baby Bear's Toys 'n Noises	1984	Stahlwood	Bath Book
The Berenstain Bears and Mama's New Job**	1984	Random House	First Time Books
The Berenstain Bears and the Big Election**	1984	Random House	Mini-storybook
The Berenstain Bears and the Dinosaurs	1984	Random House	Mini-storybook
The Berenstain Bears and the Neighborly Skunk*	1984	Random House	Mini-storybook
The Berenstain Bears and Too Much TV**	1984	Random House	First Time Books
The Berenstain Bears Meet Santa Bear	1984	Random House	First Time Books
The Berenstain Bears Shoot the Rapids*	1984	Random House	Mini-storybook
The Berenstain Bears and Too Much Junk Food**	1985	Random House	First Time Books
The Berenstain Bears Forget Their Manners*	1985	Random House	First Time Books
The Berenstain Bears Learn About Strangers*	1985	Random House	First Time Books
The Berenstain Bears on the Moon	1985	Random House	Bright & Early
The Berenstain Bears' Toy Time	1985	Random House	Cuddle cloth book
The Berenstain Bears' Bath Book	1985	Random House	Bath Book
The Berenstain Bears' Knight to Remember*	1986	Random House	Happy House
The Berenstain Bears and the Week at Grandma's**	1986	Random House	First Time Books
The Berenstain Bears Get Stage Fright*	1986	Random House	First Time Books
The Berenstain Bears: No Girls Allowed*	1986	Random House	First Time Books
The Berenstain Bears and Too Much Birthday*	1986	Random House	First Time Books
The Berenstain Bears Go Out for The Team**	1986	Random House	First Time Books
The Berenstain Bears and The Trouble with Friends*	1986	Random House	First Time Books
The Berenstain Bears Meet Questron: Left, Right, Stop, Go	1987	Questron Electronic Books	—
The Berenstain Bears Meet Questron: One, Two, Three - How Many...	1987	Questron Electronic Books	—
The Berenstain Bears and the Bad Habit**	1987	Random House	First Time Books
The Berenstain Bears and the Big Road Race**	1987	Random House	First Time Readers
The Berenstain Bears and the Missing Honey*	1987	Random House	First Time Readers
The Berenstain Bears Blaze a Trail*	1987	Random House	First Time Readers
The Berenstain Bears and the Not-So-Buried Treasure*	1987	Random House	Happy House
The Berenstain Bears and the Mansion Mystery*	1987	Random House	Happy House
The Berenstain Bears and the Coughing Catfish*	1987	Random House	Happy House
The Berenstain Bears on the Job**	1987	Random House	First Time Readers
The Berenstain Bears and the Trouble at School**	1987	Random House	First Time Books
The Berenstain Bears and the Bad Dream**	1988	Random House	First Time Books
The Berenstain Bears and the Double Dare**	1988	Random House	First Time Books
The Berenstain Bears and the Ghost of the Forest*	1988	Random House	First Time Readers
The Berenstain Bears Get the Gimmies**	1988	Random House	First Time Books
The Berenstain Bears: Ready, Get Set, Go!	1988	Random House	First Time Readers
The Berenstain Bears and the In-Crowd**	1989	Random House	First Time Books
The Berenstain Bears and Too Much Vacation**	1989	Random House	First Time Books
The Berenstain Bears Trick or Treat**	1989	Random House	First Time Books
The Berenstain Bears and the Prize Pumpkin**	1990	Random House	First Time Books
The Berenstain Bears and the Slumber Party**	1990	Random House	First Time Books
The Berenstain Bears and the Trouble with Pets**	1990	Random House	First Time Books
The Berenstain Bears and the Attic Treasure**	1990	McDonald's	Published in 1996 by Family Time Books
The Berenstain Bears and the Eager Beavers	1990	McDonald's	Published in 1996 by Family Time Books
The Berenstain Bears: Life with Papa*	1990	McDonald's	Published in 1996 by Family Time Books
The Berenstain Bears and the Substitute Teacher*	1990	McDonald's	Published in 1996 by Family Time Books
The Berenstain Bears Are a Family	1991	Random House	First First Time Books (Also Toddler Books, 1996)
The Berenstain Bears at the Super-Duper Market	1991	Random House	First First Time Books (Also Toddler Books, 1996)
The Berenstain Bears: Don't Pollute (Anymore)**	1991	Random House	First Time Books
The Berenstain Bears and the Four Seasons**	1991	Random House	First First Time Books (Also Toddler Books, 1996)
The Berenstain Bears Say Goodnight	1991	Random House	First First Time Books (Also Toddler Books, 1996)
The Berenstain Bears and the Trouble with Grownups**	1992	Random House	First Time Books
The Berenstain Bears and Too Much Pressure**	1992	Random House	First Time Books
The Berenstain Bears and the Big Red Kite**	1992	Western	Cub Club
The Berenstain Bears and the Broken Piggy Bank	1992	Western	Cub Club
The Berenstain Bears Get Jealous	1992	Western	Cub Club
The Berenstain Bears' Home Sweet Tree**	1992	Western	Cub Club
The Berenstain Bears: Hug and Make Up**	1992	Western	Cub Club
The Berenstain Bears Learn to Share	1992	Western	Cub Club
The Berenstain Bears on Time**	1992	Western	Cub Club
The Berenstain Bears and the Perfect Fishing Spot	1992	Western	Cub Club
The Berenstain Bears and the Spooky Shadows	1992	Western	Cub Club
The Berenstain Bears on the Road	1992	Random House	Form Book
The Berenstain Bears Visit the Fun Park**	1992	Western	Cub Club
The Berenstain Bears' Big Rummage Sale	1992	Golden	Golden Sound Story
The Berenstain Bears' Home Sweet Tree	1993	Play-Along Entertainment	—
The Berenstain Bears and the Drug Free Zone	1993	Random House	Big Chapter Books
The Berenstain Bears and the New Girl in Town	1993	Random House	Big Chapter Books
The Berenstain Bears Gotta Dance!	1993	Random House	Big Chapter Books
The Berenstain Bears and the Nerdy Nephew**	1993	Random House	Big Chapter Books
The Berenstain Bears and the Red-Handed Thief	1993	Random House	Big Chapter Books
The Berenstain Bears Accept No Substitutes	1993	Random House	Big Chapter Books
The Berenstain Bears and the Female Fullback**	1993	Random House	Big Chapter Books
The Berenstain Bears and the Wheelchair Commando	1993	Random House	Big Chapter Books
The Berenstain Bears: All Year 'Round	1993	Western	Cub Club
The Berenstain Bears and the Baby Chipmunk**	1993	Western	Cub Club
The Berenstain Bears and the Bedtime Battle	1993	Western	Cub Club
The Berenstain Bears and the Excuse Note**	1993	Western	Cub Club
The Berenstain Bears and the Family Get Together**	1993	Western	Cub Club
The Berenstain Bears Get a Checkup	1993	Western	Cub Club
The Berenstain Bears at the Giant Mall**	1993	Western	Cub Club
The Berenstain Bears and the Good Deed	1993	Western	Cub Club
The Berenstain Bears and the Hiccup Cure**	1993	Western	Cub Club
The Berenstain Bears and the Jump Rope Contest**	1993	Western	Cub Club
The Berenstain Bears Learn About Colors	1993	Western	Cub Club
The Berenstain Bears' Pet Show**	1993	Western	Cub Club
The Berenstain Bears and the Spooky Old House	1993	Western	Cub Club
The Berenstain Bears Visit Farmer Ben	1993	Western	Cub Club
The Berenstain Bears and the Wishing Star**	1993	Western	Cub Club
The Berenstain Bears with Nothing to Do**	1993	Western	Cub Club
The Berenstain Bears and the Secret Clubhouse	1994	Colorforms	My First Colorforms Books
The Berenstain Bears and Their Forest Friends	1994	Colorforms	My First Colorforms Books
The Berenstain Bears and the Bully	1993	Random House	First Time Books
The Berenstain Bears and the New Neighbors**	1994	Random House	First Time Books
The Berenstain Bears and the Galloping Ghost	1994	Random House	Big Chapter Books
The Berenstain Bears and the Giddy Grandma**	1994	Random House	Big Chapter Books
The Berenstain Bears and the Dress Code	1994	Random House	Big Chapter Books
The Berenstain Bears and the School Scandal Sheet	1994	Random House	Big Chapter Books
The Berenstain Bears at Camp Crush	1994	Random House	Big Chapter Books
The Berenstain Bears at the Big Bear Fair	1994	Western	Cub Club
The Berenstain Bears and the Big Picture	1994	Western	Cub Club
The Berenstain Bears and the Birthday Boy**	1994	Western	Cub Club
The Berenstain Bears Get Lost in a Cave**	1994	Western	Cub Club
The Berenstain Bears and the Soccer Tryouts**	1994	Western	Cub Club
The Berenstain Bears and the Summer Job**	1994	Western	Cub Club
The Berenstain Bears and the Talent Show**	1994	Western	Cub Club
The Berenstain Bears Visit Uncle Tex	1994	Western	Cub Club
The Berenstain Bears in the Movies	1994	Yes! Entertainment	Where Is It? Storybook
The Berenstain Bears and the Green-Eyed Monster**	1995	Random House	First Time Books
The Berenstain Bears and Too Much Teasing	1995	Random House	First Time Books
The Berenstain Bears Count Their Blessings**	1995	Random House	First Time Books
The Berenstain Bears and the Media Madness	1995	Random House	Big Chapter Books
The Berenstain Bears in the Freaky Funhouse	1995	Random House	Big Chapter Books
The Berenstain Bears and the Showdown at Chainsaw Gap	1995	Random House	Big Chapter Books
The Berenstain Bear Scouts and the Humongous Pumpkin*	1995	Scholastic	Bear Scouts
The Berenstain Bear Scouts in Giant Bat Cave*	1995	Scholastic	Bear Scouts
The Berenstain Bear Scouts Meet Bigpaw	1995	Scholastic	Bear Scouts
The Berenstain Bears' Family Tree House	1995	Yes! Entertainment	Pop-Up Book
The Berenstain Bear Scouts and the Coughing Catfish	1996	Scholastic	Bear Scouts
The Berenstain Bears: Cook It!	1996	Random House	First Time Do-It!
The Berenstain Bears: Draw It!**	1996	Random House	First Time Do-It!
The Berenstain Bears: Fly It!**	1996	Random House	First Time Do-It!
The Berenstain Bears: Grow It!**	1996	Random House	First Time Do-It!
The Berenstain Bears at the Teen Rock Café	1996	Random House	Big Chapter Books
The Berenstain Bears in Maniac Mansion	1996	Random House	Big Chapter Books
The Berenstain Bears in Big Bear City	1996	Random House	Peek-a-board
The Berenstain Bears Visit the Big City	1996	Hasbro/Playskool	Magic Touch Talking Books
The Berenstain Bears: When We Grow Up	1996	Hasbro/Playskool	Magic Touch Talking Books
The Berenstain Bears: A Visit to the Big Museum	1996	Hasbro/Playskool	Magic Touch Talking Books
The Berenstain Bears: Yike! Yike! Where's My Trike?	1996	Random House	Peek-a-board
The Berenstain Bear Scouts Save That Backscratcher	1996	Scholastic	Bear Scouts
The Berenstain Bears: Scrub a Dub Dub	1996	Family Time	Bath Book
The Berenstain Bear Scouts and the Terrible Talking Termite*	1996	Scholastic	Bear Scouts
The Berenstain Bear Scouts and the Sci-Fi Pizza*	1996	Scholastic	Bear Scouts
The Berenstain Bear Scouts Ghost Versus Ghost	1996	Scholastic	Bear Scouts
The Berenstain Bears: Welcome to Bear Country	1996	Family Time	Pop-Up Book
The Berenstain Bears' All-Time Favorite Nursery Songs	1997	Family Time	—
The Berenstain Bears at the Big Fun Park	1997	Family Time	Board Book
The Berenstain Bears' Easter Magic	1997	Family Time	Board Book
The Berenstain Bears Go Out to Eat	1997	Family Time	Board Book
The Berenstain Bears Go to the Movies**	1997	Family Time	Board Book
The Berenstain Bears: Pick Up and Put Away**	1997	Family Time	Board Book
The Berenstain Bears and the Homework Hassle**	1997	Random House	First Time Books
The Berenstain Bears and the Blame Game	1997	Random House	First Time Books
The Berenstain Bears and the Bermuda Triangle	1997	Random House	Big Chapter Books
The Berenstain Bears and the Ghost Of The Auto Graveyard	1997	Random House	Big Chapter Books
The Berenstain Bears and the Haunted Hayride	1997	Random House	Big Chapter Books
The Berenstain Bears and Queenie's Crazy Crush	1997	Random House	Big Chapter Books
The Berenstain Bears' Home Sweet Tree	1997	Random House	Big Flap Book
The A Book	1997	Random House	Bright & Early
The Berenstain Bear Scouts and the Sinister Smoke Ring	1997	Scholastic	Bear Scouts
The Berenstain Bear Scouts and the Magic Crystal Caper*	1997	Scholastic	Bear Scouts
The Berenstain Bear Scouts and the Run-Amuck Robot	1997	Scholastic	Bear Scouts
The Berenstain Bear Scouts and the Ice Monster*	1997	Scholastic	Bear Scouts
The Berenstain Bears' Thanksgiving	1997	Scholastic	—
The Berenstain Bears' Great Scuba Dive	1997	Family Time	Bath Book
The Berenstain Bears: Back to School	1997	Family Time	GT Publishing
The Berenstain Bears' Bedtime Stories	1997	Family Time	GT Publishing
The Berenstain Bears Get the Grouchies	1997	Family Time	GT Publishing
The Berenstain Bears Help Around the House	1997	Family Time	GT Publishing
The Berenstain Bears Hold Hands at the Big Mall	1997	Family Time	GT Publishing
The Berenstain Bears on the Road	1997	Family Time	GT Publishing
The Berenstain Bears Say Please and Thank You**	1997	Family Time	GT Publishing
The Berenstain Bears in the Spooky Fun House	1997	Family Time	Pop-Up Book
The Berenstain Bears Get Their Kicks	1998	Random House	First Time Books
The Berenstain Bears Lend a Helping Hand**	1998	Random House	First Time Books
The Berenstain Bears Go Platinum	1998	Random House	Big Chapter Books
The Berenstain Bears and the Big Date	1998	Random House	Big Chapter Books
The Berenstain Bears and the Love Match	1998	Random House	Big Chapter Books
The Berenstain Bears and the Perfect Crime (almost)	1998	Random House	Big Chapter Books
The Berenstain Bears Get the Don't Haftas	1998	Random House	Jellybean Books
The Berenstain Bears Get the Screamies	1998	Random House	Jellybean Books
The Berenstain Bears by the Sea**	1998	Random House	Step-into-Reading/Beginner Books
The Berenstain Bears Ride the Thunderbolt (as Visit Fun Park)**	1998	Random House	Step-into-Reading
Big Bear, Small Bear**	1998	Random House	Step-into-Reading
The Berenstain Bear Scouts and the Missing Merit Badges	1998	Scholastic	Bear Scouts
The Berenstain Bear Scouts and the Search For Naughty Ned	1998	Scholastic	Bear Scouts
The Berenstain Bears Play Ball!	1998	Scholastic	—
The Berenstain Bears' Comic Valentine	1998	Scholastic	—
The Berenstain Bears' Easter Surprise	1998	Scholastic	—
The Berenstain Bear Scouts Scream Their Heads Off	1998	Scholastic	Bear Scouts
The Berenstain Bear Scouts and the Really Big Disaster	1998	Scholastic	Bear Scouts
The Berenstain Bear Scouts and the Evil Eye	1998	Scholastic	Bear Scouts
The Berenstain Bear Scouts and the Ripoff Queen	1998	Scholastic	Bear Scouts
The Berenstain Bears' Mad, Mad, Mad Toy Craze	1999	Random House	First Time Books
The Berenstain Bears Think of Those in Need**	1999	Random House	First Time Books
The Berenstain Bears and the Big Question**	1999	Random House	First Time Books
The Berenstain Bears and the G-Rex Bones	1999	Random House	Big Chapter Books
The Berenstain Bears Lost in Cyberspace	1999	Random House	Big Chapter Books
The Berenstain Bears Wax Museum	1999	Random House	Big Chapter Books
The Berenstain Bears Go Hollywood	1999	Random House	Big Chapter Books
The Berenstain Bears Get the Noisies	1999	Random House	Jellybean Books
The Berenstain Bears Get the Scaredies	1999	Random House	Jellybean Books
The Berenstain Bears Go Up and Down**	1999	Random House	Step-into-Reading
The Berenstain Bears and the House of Mirrors**	1999	Random House	Step-into-Reading
The Berenstain Bears Catch the Bus**	1999	Random House	Step-into-Reading
Berenstain Baby Bears: My New Bed	1999	Random House	Baby Bears
Berenstain Baby Bears: My Trusty Car Seat	1999	Random House	Baby Bears
Berenstain Baby Bears: My Potty and I	1999	Random House	Baby Bears
Berenstain Baby Bears: Pacifier Days	1999	Random House	Baby Bears
The Berenstain Bear Scouts and the White Water Mystery	1999	Random House	Bear Scouts
The Berenstain Bear Scouts and the Stinky Milk Mystery	1999	Random House	Bear Scouts
The Berenstain Bears' Book of Values	1999	Berenstain Entertainment	Cloth Book
The Berenstain Bears' Red Roadster	2000	Ertl	—
The Berenstain Bears: The Whole Year Through	2000	Scholastic	—
The Berenstain Bears: That Stump Must Go**	2000	Random House	Beginner Books
The Birds, the Bees, and the Berenstain Bears	2000	Random House	First Time Books
The Berenstain Bears: Baby Makes Five	2000	Random House	First Time Books
The Berenstain Bears and the Big Blooper**	2000	Random House	First Time Books
The Berenstain Bears: No Guns Allowed	2000	Random House	Big Chapter Books
The Berenstain Bears and the Great Ant Attack	2000	Random House	Big Chapter Books
The Berenstain Bears: Phenom in the Family	2000	Random House	Big Chapter Books
The Berenstain Bears Get the Twitchies	2000	Random House	Jellybean Books
The Berenstain Bears Go In and Out	2000	Random House	Step-into-Reading
Berenstain Baby Bears: Me First! Me First!	2000	Random House	Baby Bears
Berenstain Baby Bears: My Everyday Book	2000	Random House	Baby Bears
The Berenstain Bears' Dollars and Sense	2001	Random House	First Time Books
The Berenstain Bears and the Tic-Tac-Toe Mystery	2001	Random House	Step-into-Reading
The Berenstain Bears and the Escape of the Bogg Brothers	2001	Random House	Step-into-Reading
The Berenstain Bears and the Missing Watermelon Money	2001	Random House	Step-into-Reading
The Berenstain Bears and the Excuse Note**	2001	Random House	First Time Books
The Berenstain Bears and the Runamuck Dog Show	2001	Random House	Stepping Stone
The Berenstain Bears and the Wrong Crowd	2001	Random House	Stepping Stone
The Berenstain Bears and the Goofy Goony Guy	2001	Random House	Stepping Stone
The Berenstain Bears and the Haunted Lighthouse**	2001	Random House	Stepping Stone
The Berenstain Bears and the Real Easter Eggs	2002	Random House	First Time Books
The Berenstain Bears' Funny Valentine	2002	Random House	First Time Books
The Berenstain Bears, Ride Like the Wind	2002	Random House	Stepping Stone
The Berenstain Bears and the Report Card Trouble	2002	Random House	First Time Books
The Berenstain Bears and the Papa's Day Surprise	2003	Random House	First Time Books
The Berenstain Bears: Too Small for the Team	2003	Random House	Stepping Stone
The Berenstain Bears Save Christmas	2003	HarperCollins	—
The Berenstain Bears Go to Grizzlyland	2003	Fisher Price	Power Touch
The Berenstain Bears and the Mama's Day Surprise	2004	Random House	First Time Books
The Berenstain Bears We Like Kites	2004	Random House	Step-into-Reading
Brother Bear Loves Dinosaurs	2004	HarperCollins	Board Book
Sister Bear Learns to Share	2004	HarperCollins	Board Book
The Berenstain Bears and the Baby Chipmunk	2005	HarperCollins	I Can Read
The Berenstain Bears and the Trouble with Chores	2005	HarperCollins	First Time Books
The Berenstain Bears and the Wishing Star	2005	HarperCollins	I Can Read
The Berenstain Bears: Bedtime Battle	2005	HarperCollins	First Time Books
The Berenstain Bears and Too Much Car Trip	2005	HarperCollins	First Time Books
The Berenstain Bears: Clean House	2005	HarperCollins	I Can Read
The Berenstain Bears Go Back to School	2005	HarperCollins	—
The Berenstain Bears Go On a Ghost Walk	2005	HarperCollins	First Time Books
The Berenstain Bears' New Pup	2005	HarperCollins	I Can Read
The Berenstain Bears Play T-Ball	2005	HarperCollins	I Can Read
The Berenstain Bears' Seashore Treasure	2005	HarperCollins	I Can Read
The Berenstain Bears' Dinosaur Adventure	2005	HarperCollins	—
The Berenstain Bears Down on the Farm	2006	HarperCollins	I Can Read
The Berenstain Bears Out West	2006	HarperCollins	I Can Read
The Berenstain Bears Hug and Make Up	2006	HarperCollins	First Time Books
The Berenstain Bears' Trouble with Commercials	2007	HarperCollins	First Time Books
The Berenstain Bears' New Kitten	2007	HarperCollins	I Can Read
The Berenstain Bears and the Big Spelling Bee	2007	HarperCollins	First Time Books
The Berenstain Bears Trim the Tree	2007	HarperCollins	Lift the Flap
The Berenstain Bears Lose a Friend	2007	HarperCollins	First Time Books
The Berenstain Bears' Baby Easter Bunny	2008	HarperCollins	Lift the Flap
The Berenstain Bears' Big Bedtime Book	2008	HarperCollins	—
The Berenstain Bears and the Bad Influence	2008	HarperCollins	First Time Books
The Berenstain Bears' Really Big Pet Show	2008	HarperCollins	First Time Books
The Berenstain Bears: God Loves You	2008	Zonderkidz	Living Lights
The Berenstain Bears and the Golden Rule	2008	Zonderkidz	Living Lights
The Berenstain Bears Go To Sunday School	2008	Zonderkidz	Living Lights
The Berenstain Bears Say Their Prayers	2008	Zonderkidz	Living Lights
The Berenstain Bears' Valentine Party	2008	HarperCollins	Lift the Flap
The Berenstain Bears' Sleepover	2008	HarperCollins	I Can Read
The Berenstain Bears' Family Reunion	2009	HarperCollins	I Can Read
The Berenstain Bears Love Their Neighbors	2009	Zonderkidz	Living Lights
The Berenstain Bears Play a Good Game	2009	Zonderkidz	Living Lights
The Berenstain Bears Safe and Sound!	2009	HarperCollins	First Time Books
The Berenstain Bears' Class Trip	2009	HarperCollins	I Can Read
The Berenstain Bears' Faithful Friends	2009	Zonderkidz	Living Lights
The Berenstain Bears Give Thanks	2009	Zonderkidz	Living Lights
The Berenstain Bears' Sick Days	2009	HarperCollins	First Time Books
The Berenstain Bears' Christmas Tree	2009	Zonderkidz	Living Lights
Reading Is Fun with The Berenstain Bears	2009	HarperCollins	I Can Read
The Berenstain Bears Go Out to Eat	2009	HarperCollins	First Time Books
The Berenstain Bears Discover God's Creation	2010	Zonderkidz	Living Lights
The Berenstain Bears and The Gift of Courage	2010	Zonderkidz	Living Lights
The Berenstain Bears and a Job Well Done	2010	Zonderkidz	Living Lights
The Berenstain Bears Kindness Counts	2010	Zonderkidz	Living Lights
The Berenstain Bears Go on Vacation	2010	HarperCollins	First Time Books
The Berenstain Bears All Aboard!	2010	HarperCollins	I Can Read
The Berenstain Bears and the Haunted House	2010	HarperCollins	Lift the Flap
The Berenstain Bears and the Joy of Giving	2010	Zonderkidz	Living Lights
The Berenstain Bears' Computer Trouble	2010	HarperCollins	First Time Books
The Berenstain Bears' Jobs Around Town	2011	Zonderkidz	I Can Read
The Berenstain Bears' Neighbor in Need	2011	Zonderkidz	I Can Read
The Berenstain Bears' Kitten Rescue	2011	Zonderkidz	I Can Read
The Berenstain Bears and the Forgiving Tree	2011	Zonderkidz	Living Lights
The Berenstain Bears' Holy Bible (NiRV)	2011	Zonderkidz	Living Lights
The Berenstain Bears Follow God's Word	2011	Zonderkidz	Living Lights
The Berenstain Bears Come Clean for School	2011	HarperCollins	
The Berenstain Bears Get Ready for Christmas	2011	Zonderkidz	Lift the Flap
The Berenstain Bears' Gossip Gang	2011	Zonderkidz	Living Lights
The Berenstain Bears Here's the Church Here's the Steeple	2011	Zonderkidz	Lift the Flap
The Berenstain Bears Let the Bible Be Your Guide	2011	Zonderkidz	Living Lights
The Berenstain Bears and the Little Lost Cub	2011	Zonderkidz	I Can Read
The Berenstain Bears and Mama's Helpers	2011	Zonderkidz	I Can Read
The Berenstain Bears and the Nutcracker	2011	HarperCollins	First Time Books
The Berenstain Bears and the Perfect Fishing Spot	2011	Zonderkidz	Living Lights
The Berenstain Bears Reap the Harvest	2011	Zonderkidz	Living Lights
The Berenstain Bears Say Please and Thank You	2011	HarperCollins	Big Book
The Berenstain Bears' Shaggy Little Pony	2011	HarperCollins	I Can Read
The Berenstain Bears Show Some Respect	2011	Zonderkidz	Living Lights
The Berenstain Bears and the Trouble with Secrets	2011	Zonderkidz	Living Lights
The Berenstain Bears' Winter Wonderland	2011	HarperCollins	Lift the Flap
The Berenstain Bears' Old-Fashioned Christmas	2012	HarperCollins	
The Berenstain Bears' Dinosaur Dig	2012	HarperCollins	First Time Books
The Berenstain Bears and the Tooth Fairy	2012	HarperCollins	First Time Books
The Berenstain Bears at the Aquarium	2012	HarperCollins	I Can Read
The Berenstain Bears: Mama For Mayor	2012	HarperCollins	I Can Read
The Berenstain Bears: We Love Our Mom!	2012	HarperCollins	First Time Books
The Berenstain Bears: Faith Gets Us Through	2012	Zonderkidz	Living Lights
The Berenstain Bears: God Made the Seasons	2012	Zonderkidz	Living Lights
The Berenstain Bears: Good Deed Scouts to the Rescue	2012	Zonderkidz	I Can Read
The Berenstain Bears Help the Homeless	2012	Zonderkidz	I Can Read
The Berenstain Bears Honey Hunt Helpers	2012	Zonderkidz	I Can Read
The Berenstain Bears: God Bless the Animals	2012	Zonderkidz	Living Lights
The Berenstain Bears and the Easter Story	2012	Zonderkidz	Living Lights
The Berenstain Bears All Things Bright and Beautiful	2012	Zonderkidz	Living Lights
The Berenstain Bears Get Involved	2012	Zonderkidz	Living Lights
The Berenstain Bears: God Bless Our Home	2012	Zonderkidz	Living Lights
The Berenstain Bears We Love Our Dad	2013	Harper Festival	—
The Berenstain Bears The Trouble with Things	2013	Zonderkidz	Living Lights
The Berenstain Bears Storybook Bible	2013	Zonderkidz	Living Lights
The Berenstain Bears' Night Before Christmas	2013	HarperCollins	
The Berenstain Bears Go Green	2013	HarperCollins	
The Berenstain Bears Thank God for Good Health	2013	Zonderkidz	I Can Read
The Berenstain Bears God Made the Colors	2013	Zonderkidz	I Can Read
The Berenstain Bears Good Deed Scouts Help Their Neighbors	2013	Zonderkidz	I Can Read
The Berenstain Bears Piggy Bank Blessings	2013	Zonderkidz	I Can Read
The Berenstain Bears Do Not Fear God Is Near	2013	Zonderkidz	I Can Read
The Berenstain Bears Thanksgiving Blessings	2013	Zonderkidz	Living Lights
The Berenstain Bears Valentine Blessings	2013	Zonderkidz	Living Lights
The Berenstain Bears Keep the Faith	2014	Zonderkidz	Living Lights
The Berenstain Bears Blessed Are the Peacemakers	2014	Zonderkidz	Living Lights
The Berenstain Bears Holy Bible	2014	Zonderkidz	Living Lights
The Berenstain Bears Biggest Brag	2014	Zonderkidz	Living Lights
The Berenstain Bears God Made You Special	2014	Zonderkidz	Living Lights
The Berenstain Bears Thanksgiving All Around	2014	HarperCollins	Lift the Flap
The Berenstain Bears Country Cookbook	2015	Zonderkidz	Living Lights
The Berenstain Bears God Bless Our Country	2015	Zonderkidz	Living Lights
The Berenstain Bears Harvest Festival	2015	Zonderkidz	Living Lights
The Berenstain Bears Storybook Bible for Little Ones	2015	Zonderkidz	Living Lights
The Berenstain Bears and the Very First Christmas	2015	Zonderkidz	Living Lights
The Berenstain Bears and Easter Sunday	2016	Zonderkidz	Living Lights
The Berenstain Bears Mother's Day Blessings	2016	Zonderkidz	Living Lights
The Berenstain Bears: We Love Soccer	2016	Zonderkidz	Living Lights
The Berenstain Bears' Easter Sunday	2016	Zonderkidz	Living Lights
The Berenstain Bears: Easter Blessings	2016	Zonderkidz	Living Lights
The Berenstain Bears: All God's Creatures	2016	Zonderkidz	Living Lights
The Berenstain Bears: Under the Sea	2016	Zonderkidz	Living Lights
The Berenstain Bears Take Off!	2016	Zonderkidz	Living Lights
The Berenstain Bears Visit the Firehouse	2016	Zonderkidz	Living Lights
The Berenstain Bears' Pirate Adventure	2016	Zonderkidz	Living Lights
The Berenstain Bears Around the World	2016	Zonderkidz	Living Lights
The Berenstain Bears' Book of Prayers	2016	Zonderkidz	Living Lights
The Berenstain Bears: Love One Another	2016	Zonderkidz	Living Lights
The Berenstain Bears: Light-Up Tree House	2016	Zonderkidz	Living Lights
The Berenstain Bears and the Christmas Angel	2016	Zonderkidz	Living Lights
The Berenstain Bears' Bedtime Devotional	2016	Zonderkidz	Living Lights
The Berenstain Bears: We Love Baseball	2017	Zonderkidz	Living Lights
The Berenstain Bears: Sister Bear and the Golden Rule	2017	Zonderkidz	Living Lights
The Berenstain Bears: Bless Our Pets	2017	Zonderkidz	Living Lights
The Berenstain Bears: Welcome to Bear Country	2017	Zonderkidz	Living Lights
The Berenstain Bears Show and Tell	2017	Zonderkidz	Living Lights
The Berenstain Bears: Bless Our Gramps and Gran	2017	Zonderkidz	Living Lights
The Berenstain Bears: God's Wonderful World	2017	Zonderkidz	Living Lights
The Berenstain Bears Play Football!	2017	Zonderkidz	Living Lights
The Berenstain Bears: Brother Bear and the Kind Cub	2017	Zonderkidz	Living Lights
The Berenstain Bears: We Love the Library	2017	Zonderkidz	Living Lights
The Berenstain Bears' Bedtime Blessings	2017	Zonderkidz	Living Lights
The Berenstain Bears: Big Machines	2017	Zonderkidz	Living Lights
The Berenstain Bears and the Ducklings	2018	Zonderkidz	Living Lights
The Berenstain Bears Just Grin and Bear It!	2018	HarperCollins	
The Berenstain Bears: Long Long Ago	2018	Zonderkidz	Living Lights
The Berenstain Bears: We Love Our Dad/We Love Our Mom	2018	Zonderkidz	Living Lights
The Berenstain Bears: Little Book of Prayers and Poems	2018	Zonderkidz	Living Lights
The Berenstain Bears Play a Fair Game	2018	Zonderkidz	Living Lights
The Berenstain Bears: Father's Day Blessings	2018	Zonderkidz	Living Lights
Halloween Is Sweet	2020	Random House	
The Berenstain Bears: Love Is Kind	2020	Living Lights	
Too Loose, Too Tight, Just Right	2026	Random House BFYR	posthumous, updated by Mike Berenstain
