= Buzz Potamkin =

American television producer (1945–2012)

- Born: Marshall Potamkin; November 22, 1945; United States
- Died: April 22, 2012 (aged 66); New York City, New York, U.S.
- Other name: Mars Potamkin
- Occupation: Television producer
- Spouse: Rosie Potamkin

Marshall "Buzz" Potamkin (November 22, 1945 – April 22, 2012) was an American television producer and director. He is known for founding his own television advertisement production studio, Perpetual Motion Pictures a.k.a. Buzzco Associates, and helping to establish Southern Star Productions. Along with advertisements, Potamkin focused on producing made-for-television animation, beginning with several television films based on the Berenstain Bears series of children's books

Potamkin went on to produce series for Hanna-Barbera after its 1991 acquisition by Turner Entertainment Co., in particular for Turner's Cartoon Network. This included producing every episode of Cartoon Network's animated showcase series, What a Cartoon!, a project developed for aspiring animators to make pilot shorts that the network could choose to develop into full-fledged series.

Over the course of his 36-year career in animation, Potamkin was nominated for 3 Primetime Emmy Awards, 2 Daytime Emmy Awards, and 1 CableACE Award.

== Career ==
Potamkin is known for founding Perpetual Motion Pictures (later called Buzzco Associates) with Candy Kugel and Vincent Cafarelli in 1968, which led to the production of hundreds of television advertisements, including the Hawaiian Punch series, MTV's "Top of the Hour" (the moon man), and MTV's "I Want My MTV" campaign. He also established the companies Visionary Media, Project X, and Southern Star Productions, an Australian/American subsidiary of Hanna-Barbera. Potamkin produced the animated specials The Berenstain Bears' Christmas Tree in 1979 and Cartoon All-Stars to the Rescue in 1990, among others.

After working at The Walt Disney Company for a short period in 1991, Potamkin was hired by Fred Seibert as Hanna-Barbera Cartoons' Executive Producer & Head of TV, where he oversaw all the studio's output and produced shorts for Cartoon Network's What a Cartoon! series through 1996.

Potamkin died from pancreatic cancer on April 22, 2012, and was survived by his wife Rosie.

== Filmography ==
Year	Work	Credit	Notes
1979	The Berenstain Bears' Christmas Tree	Producer	TV movie
1980	The Berenstain Bears Meet Bigpaw	Producer	TV movie
1981	Strawberry Shortcake in Big Apple City	Producer	TV short
1981	The Berenstain Bears' Easter Surprise	Producer	TV movie
1982	The Berenstain Bears' Comic Valentine	Producer	TV movie
1983	The Berenstain Bears Play Ball	Producer	TV movie
1983	Deck the Halls with Wacky Walls	Producer	TV movie
1985	ABC Weekend Special	Supervising producer	Episode "The Velveteen Rabbit"
1985	The Berenstain Bears Show	Producer/director	TV series
1985–88	CBS Storybreak	Supervising producer	TV series
1986–87	Teen Wolf	Executive producer	TV series
1988	Mad Scientist	Producer	Video short
1989	Marvin: Baby of the Year	Producer/director	TV short
1990	Fox's Peter Pan & the Pirates	Executive producer	TV series
1990	Cartoon All-Stars to the Rescue	Producer	TV short
1992	The Addams Family	Executive producer	TV series
1993	SWAT Kats: The Radical Squadron	Executive producer	TV series
1993	The Halloween Tree	Executive producer	TV movie
1993–95	2 Stupid Dogs	Executive producer	TV series
1993–96	Captain Planet and the Planeteers	Executive producer	TV series
1994	Scooby-Doo! in Arabian Nights	Executive producer	TV movie
1994	A Flintstones Christmas Carol	Executive producer	TV movie
1995–97	What a Cartoon!	Executive producer	TV series (shorts)
1995	Daisy-Head Mayzie	Executive producer	TV short
1995	Aaron's Magic Village	Producer	(U.S. version)
1995	Jonny Quest vs. The Cyber Insects	Executive producer	TV movie
1996	Dexter's Laboratory	Executive producer	TV series
1996	Big Bag	Executive producer	TV series
1996–97	The Real Adventures of Jonny Quest	Executive producer	TV series
1997; 2004	Johnny Bravo	Executive producer	TV series
1997; 2004	South Park	Producer/directed	TV series, uncredited
1998	Buster & Chauncey's Silent Night	Producer/director	Video

== Accolades ==
Year	Award	Category	Work	Shared with	Result
1986	Daytime Emmy Awards	Outstanding Animated Program	CBS Storybreak	Paul Bogrow, Steve Lumley, Allan Stevens, and Chris Cuddington	Nominated
1988	Daytime Emmy Awards	Outstanding Animated Program	CBS Storybreak	Paul Bogrow and Gordon Kent	Nominated
1995	CableACE Awards	Children's Special or Series - 6 and Younger	Daisy-Head Mayzie	Audrey Geisel, Christopher O'Hare, and Margot McDonough	Won
1995	Primetime Emmy Awards	Outstanding Animated Program (for Programming One Hour or Less)	Daisy-Head Mayzie	Audrey Geisel, Christopher O'Hare, Tony Collingwood, and Dr. Seuss	Nominated
1995	Primetime Emmy Awards	Outstanding Animated Program (for Programming One Hour or Less)	Dexter's Laboratory	Genndy Tartakovsky and Larry Huber for "Changes"	Nominated
1996	Primetime Emmy Awards	Outstanding Animated Program (for Programming One Hour or Less)	Cow and Chicken	Larry Huber, David Feiss, Pilar Menendez, and Sam Kieth for "No Smoking"	Nominated
