= The Berenstain Bears Meet Bigpaw =

- Title screen from the original NBC TV special (1980)
- Created by: Stan and Jan Berenstain
- Based on: The Berenstain Bears by Stan and Jan Berenstain
- Written by: Stan and Jan Berenstain
- Directed by: Mordicai Gerstein; Al Kouzel
- Starring: Ron McLarty; Pat Lysinger; Jonathan Lewis; Gabriela Glatzer; Bob Kaliban
- Narrated by: Ron McLarty (uncredited)
- Theme music composer: Elliot Lawrence
- Country of origin: United States
- Original language: English

Production
- Producer: Buzz Potamkin
- Editor: Neil Lawrence
- Running time: 23 minutes
- Production companies: Perpetual Motion Pictures; The Joseph Cates Company

Original release
- Network: NBC
- Release: November 20, 1980

Related
- The Berenstain Bears' Christmas Tree (1979); The Berenstain Bears' Easter Surprise (1981)

The Berenstain Bears Meet Bigpaw is a Thanksgiving-themed animated television special based on the Berenstain Bears children's book series by Stan and Jan Berenstain. Produced by Buzz Potamkin and directed by Mordicai Gerstein and Al Kouzel, the program made its debut on NBC on November 20, 1980. The television special inspired a book, The Berenstain Bears' Thanksgiving, published by Scholastic in 1997.

== Development ==
Stan and Jan Berenstain's first animated holiday special aired on NBC in December 1979. The Berenstain Bears' Christmas Tree was the first of five annual animated specials that would air on NBC, produced by Joe Cates and the Joseph Cates Production Company. The Berenstain Bears Meet Bigpaw was the second in this series.

== Cast ==
- Ron McLarty as Papa Bear and the Narrator
- Pat Lysinger as Mama Bear and the Hedgehog
- Jonathan Lewis as Brother Bear
- Gabriela Glatzer as Sister Bear
- Bob Kaliban as Bigpaw
- Animators (Vinnie Bell, Vincent J. Cafarlli, Jack Dazzo, Candy Kugel, Jan Siochak) as The Bear Country Forces Members

The Berenstains utilized rhyming couplets in the script - for both the narrator and the character dialogue. This element had also been used in the Christmas special and was familiar to audiences since a similar type of writing was used in the Berenstain Bears Beginner Books series.

The special is officially the first appearance of the Bigpaw character in the Berenstain Bears series. A precursor to Bigpaw, Great Natural Bear, appeared in The Bears' Almanac in 1973 and is the basis on which Bigpaw was developed. Bigpaw appears in several subsequent books and the CBS cartoon series.

== Production and casting ==
The 25-minute special was created and written by Stan and Jan Berenstain and featured original music composed and conducted by Emmy-winning musician Elliot Lawrence, with lyrics provided by Stan Berenstain. The score included three original songs: "Thankfulness", "Bigpaw", and "A Stranger's Just Somebody (You Don't Already Know)".

The special starred Ron McLarty, Gabriela Glatzer, Jonathan Lewis, and Pat Lysinger as Papa, Sister, Brother, and Mama Bear, respectively. McLarty also doubled as the show's narrator. All four actors were reprising their vocal roles from The Berenstain Bears' Christmas Tree. Bob Kaliban was the voice of Bigpaw.

It was the second of five Berenstain Bears animated specials that aired on NBC from 1979 to 1983.

== Premiere ==
The program premiered on NBC on Thursday, November 20, 1980, at 8:30 PM ET. Its lead-in was Daffy Duck's Thanks-for-Giving Special and it competed against The Waltons on CBS and NFL football on ABC. The special was sponsored by Kellogg's.

== Plot ==
VHS editions of Bigpaw. The special was originally released by Embassy Home Entertainment (1987) and then by Kids Klassics (1989). The special has also been made available on LaserDisc and DVD.

Thanksgiving is approaching in Bear Country. The Bear Family attempt to discern their fortunes by reading the harvest honeycomb when an ominous footprint appears in the bottom of the pan. Mama interprets this as a sign that the Thanksgiving Legend of Bigpaw is coming to pass. According to this legend, Mama states and warns the cubs that if the bears were selfish, greedy and unkind to the needy and do not share in the bounties of nature, Bigpaw will come and gobble up Bear Country county by county. Papa believes the story to be nonsense, unaware that Bigpaw is real and is entering Bear Country as they speak, with the animals of the forests on the outskirts of the country fleeing in terror.

Papa considers himself a bear "for all seasons", telling the cubs how he takes care of the Earth and all of its creatures year-round - and especially on days like Easter, Christmas, and Arbor Day. But when it comes to Thanksgiving, Papa seems to care more about eating a feast than giving thanks. Brother and Sister decide to go and gather mixed nuts for Papa. While Mama continues the Thanksgiving preparations at home ("Thankfulness"), Papa visits a pumpkin patch but learns from a hedgehog who fled the forest that the terrifying Bigpaw is real and is on the move through Sinister Bog, where Brother and Sister are gathering nuts.

Brother and Sister feel the earth trembling as Bigpaw approaches ("Bigpaw"). Terrified, the cubs lose their balance and begin to fall from the tree. They are saved from injury, though, by landing in the enormous hand of Bigpaw. Instead of hurting them, Bigpaw gently places them safely upon the ground and the cubs immediately realize that Bigpaw is not a creature to fear.

Meanwhile, back at the village square, Papa has gathered members of Bear Country, rallying a group of citizens to seek out Bigpaw and "get him before he gets us". Mama thinks the bears are getting carried away and convinces them to use their heads and think things through ("A Stranger's Just Somebody (You Don't Already Know)"). Bigpaw has climbed a high mountain to take a nap and his yawn echoes through the valley. But the fearful bears interpret his yawn as a terrifying roar and Papa - seeing Bigpaw's giant shadow - assembles "The Bear Country Forces". Brother and Sister try to tell Papa of Bigpaw's kindness, but he doesn't listen.

Upon the mountain, Bigpaw was setting in for his nap when he heard the sound of the angry bears approaching. Afraid of the approaching bears, Bigpaw builds a tall stack of boulders to use as weapons against the approaching mob until Sister and Brother intervene, placing themselves between Bigpaw and the angry members of Bear Country. Bigpaw holds back his tower of rock, gently picks up Brother and Sister, who explain how kind the giant is.

Everyone realizes the truth and celebrates the averted disaster. The Bear Family invites Bigpaw to Thanksgiving dinner the following day, at which time Bigpaw presents Papa with his favorite treat - mixed nuts ("Thankfulness - Reprise").

== Book adaptation ==
Cover of storybook version of "Meet Bigpaw", entitled "The Berenstain Bears' Thanksgiving", published by Scholastic (1997).

A storybook version of the film was published by Scholastic in 1997 under the title The Berenstain Bears' Thanksgiving. The book closely follows the plot of the television special. As of August 2016, the book is out of print but can be easily found on the secondhand market. The Berenstain Bear Scouts Meet Bigpaw (1995) has a similar plot.

== Home media ==
In 1984, Embassy Home Entertainment released the special on LaserDisc as a double-feature with The Berenstain Bears' Christmas Tree, called "A Berenstain Bears Celebration". In 1987, the special was made available on VHS by Embassy Home Entertainment as part of their "Children's Treasures" series. In 1989, the special was distributed on VHS by Kids Klassics. The special was re-released in 1992 by GoodTimes Home Video, in a double-feature with The Berenstain Bears' Christmas Tree. In 2002, the special was released on DVD by GoodTimes, also in a double-feature with The Berenstain Bears' Christmas Tree. This is the only Berenstain Bears special that was never reissued with the 1980s TV series by Sony Wonder.
