= The Memory of Running =

2004 novel by Ron McLarty

- Author: Ron McLarty
- Language: English
- Publication date: 2004

The Memory of Running is a 2004 novel by Ron McLarty. Narrated by obese, single, and suddenly orphaned Vietnam War-veteran Smithy Ide, the book relates, in alternating chapters, his bike ride across the country, from East Providence, Rhode Island to Los Angeles, to claim the body of his late, mentally unbalanced sister, and an examination of the broken life which had led him here.

McLarty had had no luck finding a publisher for his novel until Stephen King, in his column in Entertainment Weekly, praised the novel (at the time only available as an audiobook) and chastised the publishing industry for being unwilling to publish it.

Swedish singer-songwriter David Fridlund wrote a song inspired by the novel with the same title.

The novel is mentioned in the closing moments of an episode of HBO's In Treatment (season 3, episode 8).
