= Buster & Chauncey's Silent Night =

- Film poster
- Directed by: Buzz Potamkin
- Written by: George Taweel; Rob Loos
- Produced by: Buzz Potamkin
- Starring: Phil Hartman; Jim Cummings; Tom Arnold; Marie Osmond; Townsend Coleman
- Edited by: Cecil Hooker
- Music by: Score: John Van Eps; Songs: Lynn Ahrens; Stephen Flaherty
- Production companies: Columbia TriStar Home Video Project X Productions; Tundra Productions
- Distributed by: Columbia TriStar Home Video
- Release date: October 13, 1998
- Running time: 49 minutes
- Country: United States
- Language: English

Buster & Chauncey's Silent Night is a 1998 American direct-to-video animated feature film, inspired by the tale of the creation of the Christmas carol "Silent Night". It was directed and produced by Buzz Potamkin and stars the voices of Phil Hartman, Jim Cummings, Marie Osmond, Tom Arnold and Lea Michele in her film debut, and the songs were written by Lynn Ahrens and Stephen Flaherty. Buster & Chauncey's Silent Night marks the final film role of Hartman, who was murdered by his wife five months before the film's release.

== Synopsis ==
In 1818, two mouse musicians named Buster and Chauncey visit the Alpine town of Oberndorf, Austria, where they plan to perform for the country's Queen during its annual Christmas pageant, which is organized by Oberndorf's Mayor Huffenmeier. At Oberndorf, an orphan girl named Christina is given asylum on the local church as she intends to go to Vienna where her aunt and uncle live, but a pair of thieves, who claim to be the Duke of Raoche and his niece Lady Gretchen, watching over the preparations for the pageant, have their sights set on seizing the riches stored inside the church. Buster and Chauncey also get settled in the church for the preparations, but a cat named Dolf chases them causing a mess inside the church that Mayor Huffenmeier blames Christina for, but the church priest, Father Joseph, doesn't think Christina caused the mess. However, the Duke and Lady Gretchen manage to steal the riches and also kidnap Christina, leaving her necklace on the place where the riches were so Father Joseph and Mayor Huffenmeier believe she stole them. Buster, Chauncey, and a bird named Fritz later help Christina escape and the Duke and Lady Gretchen are caught, with the riches being recovered, proving that Christina is innocent all along, but the previous chase caused damage to the church's organ. Later on, the melody Chauncey has been playing repeatedly on his violin inspires the organist. Father Joseph, who has written a poem, uses the melody to compose "Silent Night" and perform it for the first time. The Queen then offers to take Christina to Vienna and Christina says goodbye to her new friends, Buster and Chauncey.

== Cast ==
Name	Character
Jim Cummings	Buster
Phil Hartman	Chauncey
Tom Arnold	Fritz
Marie Osmond	Queen Therese IV
Townsend Coleman (speaking); Gregg Edelman (singing)	Father Joseph
Harry Goz	Mayor Huffenmeier
Lea Michele	Christina
Paul Kandel	Duke of Raoche
Judith Blazer	Lady Gretchen
Earl Hammond	Additional voices
Ellen Bernfeld	Additional voices
Peppy Castro	Additional voices
Madeline Doherty	Additional voices
Joy Hermalyn	Additional voices

== Production ==
Silent Night was the first in-house animated production for Columbia TriStar Home Video, and was produced by Buzz Potamkin through his own company, Project X Productions. It was Phil Hartman’s last film work; the film was released five months after his murder. Marie Osmond, one of its stars, sang the title tune. The film features future Glee actress Lea Michele in one of her first film roles.

== Songs ==
All lyrics are written by Lynn Ahrens; all music is composed by Stephen Flaherty.

No.	Title	Performer(s)	Length
1.	"Christmas in Oberndorf"	Lea Michele, Jim Cummings, Phil Hartman & Chorus
2.	"Holiday for Thieves"	Paul Kandel & Judith Blazer
3.	"Things That I've Collected"	Lea Michele
4.	"Silent Night"	Gregg Edelman, Lea Michele & Marie Osmond

== Release ==
On October 13, 1998, Columbia TriStar released Buster & Chauncey's Silent Night on videocassette. The film aired on the primetime lineup of cable's Disney Channel two months later. Overseas, it was also shown in Canada (on national network CTV and cable station Teletoon). In Latin America, the film airs occasionally on Cartoon Network since 2001, and on Disney Channel since 2012; on Great Britain's Five; and on the Movie Channel in Israel. The film was reissued on DVD on September 19, 2000; by late 2002, the film had sold over 800,000 copies in the U.S. Plans for a sequel were discussed shortly after the original release, but never materialized.

== Reception ==
Reviews were generally negative. At the DVD Verdict review site, "Judge" Gary Militzer gave it an overall score of 43. While criticizing the animation and storyline—along with puns relating to the word "mouse"—he added, "Think of all the great memories we have watching those enduring Christmas specials like Rudolph the Red-Nosed Reindeer, Frosty the Snowman, 'Twas the Night Before Christmas, or my personal favorite, A Christmas Story. Unfortunately [this film] certainly cannot stand alongside those timeless, beloved holiday classics." Similarly, Brian Webster of the Apollo Movie Guide gave it a 42. "[This] is an example of a less ambitious animated film," he said, "[which] has more in common with Saturday morning cartoons than it does with recent animated successes." Both he and Militzer not only observed the accents of the characters—the main characters speak like Americans, while the thieves and some townspeople have peculiar German tones—but also "out of sync" animation. Lois Alter Mark of Entertainment Weekly commented, "Probably not [a good choice for youngsters]. The scattershot story and uninspired animation won't hold most kids' attention." Writing in the Los Angeles Times, Lynne Heffley said, "The animation is standard, but the message about the meaning of the season, based on the writing of the soulful Christmas carol, comes through."

== See also ==
- List of American films of 1998
- List of animated feature films
- List of Christmas films
