= Mike Berenstain =

American writer and illustrator (born 1951)

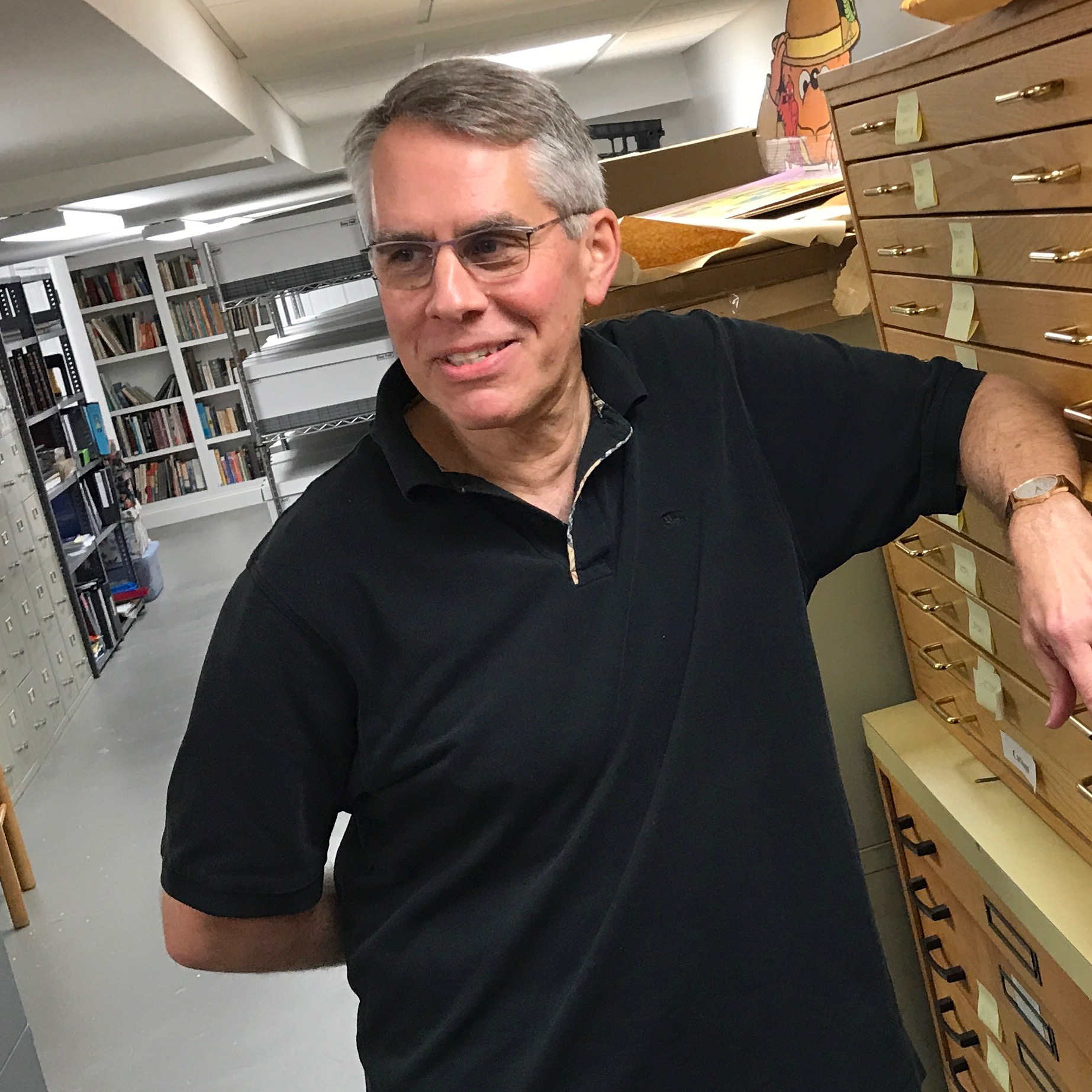
- Berenstain in 2017
- Born: Michael Berenstain; December 21, 1951 (age 74); Philadelphia, Pennsylvania, U.S.
- Occupations: Writer; illustrator
- Years active: 1976–present
- Parent: Stan and Jan Berenstain

Michael Berenstain (born December 21, 1951) is an American writer and illustrator of children's books. He is the son of Stan and Jan Berenstain and the current author of the Berenstain Bears series of picture books.

== Biography ==
Michael was born in Philadelphia, Pennsylvania. He studied at Philadelphia College of Art and the Pennsylvania Academy of Fine Arts. His earliest work in the U.S. Library of Congress catalog was published in 1976: K'tonton on an Island in the Sea by Sadie Rose Weilerstein, which he illustrated as Michael Berenstain or Michael Berenstein (Philadelphia: Jewish Publication Society of America). The third K'tonton book, it features "Adventures of a thumb-sized Jewish boy who must fend for himself when stranded on an island." During the next three years he wrote and illustrated four instructive picture books published by David McKay, The Castle Book and sequels on ships, armor, and lighthouses. He first collaborated with his parents by illustrating two picture books (The Day of the Dinosaur and After the Dinosaurs --by Random House, 1987 and 1988). He wrote and illustrated several other dinosaur books --known as the I Love Dinosaurs book series-- himself (including King of the Dinosaurs, The Biggest Dinosaurs, The Spike-Tailed Dinosaur, The Horned Dinosaur, and Flying Dinosaurs). These five books are the five sequels to The Day of the Dinosaur.

He is credited as a creator of his family's bear family beginning in 1995 as illustrator of the Bear Scouts subseries. Michael continued the Berenstain Bears with his mother following his father's death in 2005, and took over sole authorship of the series after his mother's death in 2012. His older brother, Leo Berenstain, is involved in management of the franchise.

Michael's father was a secular Jew, and his mother was an Episcopalian. He and his brother were raised in a secular household. Berenstain began investigating Christianity after he married and sent his children to Quaker schools. He was baptized in a Presbyterian church and eventually partnered with Zondervan, an evangelical Christian publishing company, to produce faith-based Berenstain Bears books.
