= The Big Honey Hunt =

1962 children's book by Stan and Jan Berenstain

- Original cover
- Author: Stan and Jan Berenstain
- Published: 1962 (Random House)
- Media type: Hardcover
- Pages: 72
- ISBN: 0-394-80028-1

The Big Honey Hunt is a children's book by Stan and Jan Berenstain, the first in the long running Berenstain Bears series. It was first published in 1962, by Beginner Books, an imprint of Random House, co-founded and managed by Dr. Seuss. The book introduces a family of anthropomorphic bears: Papa Bear, Mama Bear, and Small Bear (later known in the series as Brother Bear following the introduction of Sister Bear).

== Plot ==
At the beginning of the book, around the Berenstain Bears' table, Mama discovers that they are out of honey and tells Papa to go get some more. He agrees and takes Small Bear along with him, but ignores Mama's advice to go to the store to buy the honey and tries to collect wild honey instead. To that end, Papa and Small Bear follow around a bee as it flies from tree to tree. At each tree, Papa declares that he is sure there is honey inside of it, but instead variously encounters an owl, a porcupine, and a family of skunks. When they do finally find a tree full of honey, it is protected by a swarm of bees. The bees chase them down to the river, where they jump in to avoid them. After the bees leave and the bears exit the water, Papa gives up and readily buys the honey from the store, as Mama suggested before.

== Background ==
Stan and Jan Berenstain, a husband and wife team from Pennsylvania, were already successful illustrators and cartoonists by the time The Big Honey Hunt was published, with their work appearing in magazines like The Saturday Evening Post and Good Housekeeping throughout the 1940s and 1950s. By the early 1960s, partly influenced by their son Leo's love for Dr. Seuss (aka Ted Geisel) books, the Berenstains decided to create books for young children. For their first book, they decided to use bears as the main characters because they were widely popular and were easy to draw. According to their other son Mike Berenstain, Stan and Jan based their family of bear characters partly on themselves and their two sons. For the relationship between the father and son, in particular, they used the 1931 film The Champ as a reference.

They decided to publish their first book with Random House, under the banner of Dr. Seuss' Beginner Books label. They took their first effort, Freddy Bear's Spanking, about a small bear who tries to avoid a spanking from his parents by suggesting a list of other punishments, to their first meeting with Geisel. Geisel praised the basic premise of the book but criticized many aspects of its execution. He became their first editor, and they spent the next two years revising their book to suit Geisel's rigorous standards. Freddy Bear's Spanking slowly became The Big Honey Hunt, and in the process, the Berenstains began to develop a formula for writing and illustrating children's books. According to their 2002 memoir, Down a Sunny Dirt Road, this included "easy words, short sentences, word/picture clues, rollicking rhythm, resolute rhyme... shameless slapstick and outrageous jokes".

== Style and themes ==
The reissued cover, showing the updated character design of Papa Bear and Brother Bear.

Like later books in the series, The Big Honey Hunt focuses on a family of anthropomorphic bears: Papa Bear, Mama Bear, and Small Bear, who was later renamed Brother Bear when Sister Bear arrived in 1974. The Berenstains described the characters thusly: "A bluff, overenthusiastic Papa Bear who wore bib overalls and a plaid shirt and... a wise Mama Bear who wore a blue dress with white polka dots... and a bright, lively little cub". Like other Berenstain Bears books, especially other early books in the series, The Big Honey Hunt features Papa Bear ignoring the advice of the wise Mama Bear, getting into trouble, and finally relenting. The book, like other early Berenstain Bears books, focuses primarily on the relationship between father and son while Mama Bear plays only a secondary role. Later books began to focus more on other relationships, especially after the introduction of Sister Bear.

The book's visuals also differ from later books in the series, particularly in character design. In The Big Honey Hunt and other early Berenstain Bears books, the bears have larger and more pronounced ears and noses, thicker eyebrows, and lighter fur than their later redesigns. The plaid shirt Papa wears under his overalls is red and white instead of yellow and black.

== Publication and legacy ==
The Big Honey Hunt was published in 1962 by Beginner Books, an imprint of Random House co-founded and edited by Dr. Seuss. The book was well-received, with The New York Times praising its "good, simple vocabulary" and "natural repetition".

Initially, after its release, Stan and Jan proposed creating a series based around their bear characters to be published by Beginner Books, but Seuss encouraged them to do something different. They began work on a book about a penguin, which they worked on for a few months. In the meantime, however, Random House salesmen had been marketing The Big Honey Hunt and it had been selling well. Seuss revisited their idea of turning the book into a series, which spawned The Bike Lesson, and eventually many other books featuring the Berenstain Bears.

The book was originally published with the authors' full names, Stanley and Janice, printed on the cover, but Seuss shortened their names to Stan and Jan in later editions, saying, "That's what you call each other. And that's what I call you. Besides, it fits on one line". The pair used the moniker "Stan and Jan Berenstain" throughout the rest of their career.

In 2002, in celebration of the 40th anniversary of the book's original publication, the Berenstains published an edition with an updated cover. In 2012, another update of the cover added a "50th-anniversary" logo but left the cover art unchanged from the 2002 edition.
