= Calliope (TV series) =

US television program

- Genre: Children's
- Developed by: Kay Koplovitz
- Written by: Eugene Francis; Peter Pileski
- Directed by: Peter Pileski
- Presented by: Eugene Francis
- Country of origin: United States
- Original language: English
- No. of seasons: 15

Production
- Executive producer: Gordon Beck
- Editor: Ron Harris
- Running time: 60 minutes (including commercials)
- Production companies: USA Network; Buzzco Associates

Original release
- Network: Madison Square Garden Network (1978–80); USA Network (1980–93)
- Release: September 1978 – 1993

Related
- USA Cartoon Express

Calliope (/kəˈlaɪ.əpi/ kə-LY-ə-pee) is a children's program that showed various live-action and animated short films. These often included European features and shorts such as Cosgrove Hall's "Cinderella" and "The Pied Piper of Hamelin", and FilmFair's Paddington.

== Overview ==
The series consisted of various short films, framed around an elderly man named Gene (voiced by Eugene Francis) and his dog Eliza viewing them. Twice an episode, pictures of kids from across the United States were shown in "Gene's Pix of the Week". Gene would also pose two questions to viewers; those who submitted their answers to an address would receive a Calliope balloon.

== Short films ==
In its early years, Calliope obtained many of its short films from Learning Corporation of America and Phoenix Films. Other shorts featured on Calliope included:

- A Visit to Apple Cider Country (1977, Canada)
- The Boyhood of Thomas Edison (1977, USA)
- Britannica's Tales Around the World (1991, USA)
- Clever Hiko-Ichi (1974, USA/Japan)
- Come See the Dolphins (1974, USA)
- Dinosaur (1980, USA)
- Emily and the Three Little Old Ladies (1980)
- The Happy Tuesday Recycling Jug Band Truck (Revisited) (1976, USA)
- Henry's Cat (1983–87, UK)
- Kids on Smoking (1979, USA)
- King Rollo (1980, UK)
- The Legend of Sleepy Hollow (1972, USA)
- Lilliput Put
- Little Train, Little Train (1972, USA)
- Mr. Hiccup
- Sacajawea (1990, USA)
- The Tender Tale of Cinderella Penguin (1981, Canada)
- The Universe and I (1976–77, USA)
- Victor & Maria (1982, UK)
- The Wizard's Son (1981, USA)
- The World According to Nicholas (1980)

== See also ==
- Pinwheel on Nickelodeon
- Big Bag on Cartoon Network
- List of animated short series
