= The Berenstain Bears' Christmas Tree =

1979 TV special directed by Mordicai Gerstein

- Title screen from the original NBC TV special (1979)
- Created by: Stan and Jan Berenstain
- Written by: Stan and Jan Berenstain
- Directed by: Mordicai Gerstein
- Starring: Ron McLarty; Gabriela Glatzer; Jonathan Lewis; Pat Lysinger
- Narrated by: Ron McLarty (uncredited)
- Theme music composer: Elliot Lawrence
- Country of origin: United States
- Original language: English

Production
- Producer: Buzz Potamkin
- Running time: 25 minutes
- Production companies: Perpetual Motion Pictures; The Joseph Cates Company

Original release
- Network: NBC
- Release: December 3, 1979

Related
- The Berenstain Bears Meet Bigpaw (1980)

The Berenstain Bears' Christmas Tree is a Christmas-themed animated television special based on the Berenstain Bears children's book series by Stan and Jan Berenstain. Produced by Buzz Potamkin and directed by Mordicai Gerstein, the program made its debut on NBC on December 3, 1979. The television special inspired a book by the same name, published by Random House in 1980.

== Plot ==
Cover of Embassy Home Entertainment VHS release (1987).

In Bear Country, Christmas is hours away, and the Bear family—Papa, Mama, Brother, and Sister—are caught up in the festivities. Their house is adorned with holly, presents are wrapped, and a Christmas salmon awaits its fate on the dinner table. The only task remaining is fetching the perfect tree: tall, straight, full, fat, and brimming with nooks and crannies for hanging their cherished ornaments. Papa enthusiastically rallies the family to unpack their impressive collection of "tree things". Out of all their decorations, their greatest pride is an exquisite eighteen-pointed Christmas tree star so radiant it outshines the night sky. Papa boasts that their display will draw bears from far and wide, declaring it the epitome of Christmas spirit. In his excitement, however, he overlooks the deeper meaning of the holiday: Christmas is about giving and thinking of others, not mere show and display.

Mama suggests buying a pre-cut tree from Grizzly Gus down the road, warning of impending snow. But Papa, trusting the lack of pain in his left big toe as a weather predictor, dismisses the idea. He scorns Gus's "overgrown evergreen weeds" and insists on chopping the finest tree himself, no matter the distance or difficulty. Ignoring the cubs' reminders of Mama's instruction and the diminishing time, Papa leads Brother and Sister into the wilderness with his ax, determined to find the perfect tree.

Their quest begins promisingly when Papa spots an immensely tall and lush specimen, but he discovers the tree houses a skunk, squirrels, a grouse, a chipmunk, and a murder of twenty-six crows. The unhappy animals make their displeasure known, and Papa reluctantly moves on, but the thought of ruining their home and their own Christmas does not fully register amid his obsession with ornaments. Undeterred, Papa presses forward, vowing to conquer streams, hills, fog, or bogs in his search. As afternoon wanes and Mama's predicted snow begins to fall, Papa targets another stately tree. This one shelters an eagle, a hawk, a wolf, and a great snowy owl. When Papa prepares to chop, the enraged birds and wolf ferociously protest; the eagle swoops down, snatches the ax and hurls it back, forcing the bears to flee.

The snow escalates into a fierce blizzard, but the bears trudge up a steep mountain until Papa spies yet another "perfect" tree. The cubs urge him to hurry, but as he approaches, he notices a tiny glowing window in the trunk. Peering inside, Papa witnesses a family of snowbirds joyfully decorating a humble twig with weed seeds for their Christmas. The simple scene strikes him profoundly, and he comes to understand that rather than grand displays, Christmas is about compassion and considering the needs of family, friends, neighbors, and even nature's creatures. Humbled, Papa shoulders his ax and spares the tree.

Turning to the cubs' concerns about their own decorations, he announces they will buy from Grizzly Gus after all. To speed their descent through the deep snow, Papa chops an old stump into three pairs of skis, and the family glides home. However, they find Gus's lot sold out, with only scattered needles remaining. Sister nearly weeps before beholding a miraculous sight: their home has been beautifully decorated by the animals Papa had spared, returning the kindness. All the Bear family's stored ornaments now adorn the foliage of their tree home, with the glittering star atop. As the bears stand speechless in awe, the true Christmas Star bathes the night sky, filling the citizens of Bear Country with warmth. The Bear family leads the crowd in a carol about the Christmas Star and its meaning.

The next day, at Christmas dinner, Sister playfully questions Papa's new philosophy in light of the salmon on the table. Chuckling, Papa declares that the family is willing to "make an exception".

== Cast ==
- Ron McLarty as Papa Bear and the Narrator
- Gabriela Glatzer as Sister Bear
- Jonathan Lewis as Brother Bear
- Pat Lysinger as Mama Bear

== Development ==
Stan and Jan Berenstain first pitched their idea for a holiday special in November 1978. They were told that there was not a market for new animated television specials, and the husband and wife team nearly gave up on the project. In February 1979, however, they received an invitation from producer Joseph Cates to discuss the idea further.

A deal with Perpetual Motion Pictures was soon solidified, and, over the course of the next several months, the Berenstain's collaborated with Mordicai Gerstein and Buzz Potamkin to develop a script and sketch nearly 20,000 original drawings needed for the animators. The Berenstain's drew for three straight weeks, struggling with some of the sketches. According to Stan and Jan: "Back views of the bears are especially challenging (we've never seen them from the back before)".

Soon after, the Berenstain's auditioned for vocal talent:

Auditioning voices: we listen to eight Papas, six Mamas and four-and-twenty Sister and Brother Bears in six hours. Actors are selected. Two days in the space station atmosphere of a high-powered sound recording studio: sound engineer Bob Lifton laughs at two of the show's ninety-seven jokes. Since he does sound for Saturday Night Live this is considered a good omen.

By mid-June, Stan and Jan saw the first bits of animation, and the completed special was viewed by the Berenstain's on November 10, just over three weeks prior to the national broadcast.

== Production and casting ==
The 25-minute special was created and written by Stan and Jan Berenstain and featured original music composed and conducted by Emmy-winning musician Elliot Lawrence, with lyrics provided by Stan Berenstain. The score included three original songs: "Christmas Day is Here (It's Almost Here)", "We Need a Tree for Christmas", and "The Christmas Star".

The Christmas special starred Ron McLarty (billed as Ron McLarity), Gabriela Glatzer, Jonathan Lewis, and Pat Lysinger as Papa, Sister, Brother, and Mama Bear, respectively. McLarty also doubled as the show's narrator.

It was the first of five Berenstain Bears animated specials that aired on NBC from 1979 to 1983. Lawrence and Berenstain would provide music and lyrics for each of four subsequent Berenstain Bears NBC specials. Most of the voice actors reprised their roles in future specials, as well.

== Premiere and reception ==
The program premiered on NBC on December 3, 1979, at 8:00 PM ET (pre-empting Little House on the Prairie). The broadcast was sponsored by Kellogg's and competed against 240-Robert on ABC and The White Shadow on CBS.

Alexis Greene, writing for The New York Times, called the special "charming", and noted its "imaginative" animation.

== Book adaptation ==
Cover of original storybook published by Random House (1980).

The plot of the storybook, published by Random House in 1980, closely follows the storyline of the television special. The Random House edition remained in print for nearly three decades until a newer storybook version was released by Zondervan in 2009. As part of the "Berenstain Bears Living Lights" series, this new edition generally follows the original plot, but focuses more closely on the Christian aspect of the holiday, including depictions of a manger scene and several Bible verses in the updated text.

== Home media releases ==
In 1984, Embassy Home Entertainment released the special in Betamax format, as well as on LaserDisc as a double-feature with The Berenstain Bears Meet Bigpaw, called "A Berenstain Bears Celebration". In 1987, the special was made available on VHS by Embassy Home Entertainment as part of the "Children's Treasures" series. In 1989, the special was distributed on VHS by Kids Klassics. In 2002, the special was released on DVD by Good Times, also in a double-feature with The Berenstain Bears Meet Bigpaw. In 2008, Sony Wonder also released the special on DVD. In this edition, the Christmas special was bundled with four bonus episodes from the 1980s cartoon series.
