= Ron McLarty =

American actor (1947–2020)

- Born: Ronald William McLarty; April 26, 1947; East Providence, Rhode Island, U.S.
- Died: February 8, 2020 (aged 72); New York City, U.S.
- Education: Rhode Island College
- Occupations: Actor; Playwright; Narrator; Novelist
- Years active: 1971–2014
- Spouses: Diane Tesitor (m. 1969; died 2002); Kate Skinner (m. 2004)
- Children: 3
- Website: www.ron-mclarty.com

Ronald William McLarty (April 26, 1947 – February 8, 2020) was an American actor, playwright, and novelist. He also worked as an audiobook narrator, in which role he recorded over 100 titles and received many Audie Awards.

McLarty appeared in numerous television series, films and stage productions. He also wrote dozens of plays and 10 novels, notably The Memory of Running (2004).

== Career ==
McLarty began his career in theatre during the early 1970s with one of his earliest professional performances being the role of Lucky in Michael Weller's Moonchildren for the play's American premiere at the Arena Stage in Washington, D.C. in November 1971. McLarty continued with the production when it moved to Broadway in 1972.

McLarty also co-starred on Spenser: For Hire, as Boston homicide detective Sgt. Frank Belson.

Although he enjoyed a successful career as an actor, he had not had much luck finding a publisher for his novel The Memory of Running, until Stephen King happened upon an audiobook version, narrated by McLarty, and praised it as "the best book you can't read". This led to the book's publication by Viking Press, and its rapid rise to bestseller status. McLarty was an accomplished narrator: besides Running, he provided narration for a number of audiobooks, including Hunter S. Thompson's Fear and Loathing in Las Vegas and the unabridged audiobook Decision Points by George W. Bush (the abridged version is narrated by the former president himself).

A graduate of Rhode Island College, class of 1969, McLarty was commencement speaker and received a Doctor of Humanities degree from RIC in 2007.

== Death ==
McLarty died on February 8, 2020, at 72 years old, having lived with dementia since 2014. He was survived by his wife, three sons, and seven grandchildren.

== Novels ==
- Mislaid. Lulu Publishing Services, 2020, softcover ISBN 978-1-6847-1801-6, ebook ISBN 978-1-7169-1557-4
- The Dropper. New York: Random House, Books on Tape, 2009 (audiobook), ISBN 0-307-70459-9
  - The Dropper was scheduled to be released as a Trade Hardcover and Signed Limited Edition by Cemetery Dance Publications in Spring 2012. ISBN 978-1-58767-275-0
- Art in America. New York: Viking Press, 2008, ISBN 0-670-01895-3
- Traveler. New York: Viking Press, 2007, ISBN 0-670-03474-6
- The Memory of Running. New York: Viking Press, 2004, ISBN 0-670-03363-4

== Filmography ==
=== Film ===
Year	Title	Role	Notes
1977	The Sentinel	Real Estate Agent	
1978	Bloodbrothers	Mac	
1982	Vigilante	Doctor	Uncredited
1983	Touched	George	
1983	Daniel	Prison Guard	
1983	Enormous Changes at the Last Minute	John Raferty	
1984	The Flamingo Kid	Pat McCarty	
1986	Heartburn	Detective O'Brien	
1989	The Feud	Dolf Beeler	
1995	Two Bits	Irish Man	
1997	The Postman	Old George	
2010	How Do You Know	George's Lawyer	
2014	St. Vincent	Principal O'Brien	(final film role)

=== Television ===
Year	Title	Role	Notes
1979	The Berenstain Bears' Christmas Tree	Papa Bear/Narrator	Voice, Television specials
1980	The Berenstain Bears Meet Bigpaw	Papa Bear/Narrator	Voice, Television specials
1981	The Berenstain Bears' Easter Surprise	Papa Bear/Narrator	Voice, Television specials
1982	The Berenstain Bears' Comic Valentine	Papa Bear/Narrator/Big Paw	Voice, Television specials
1983	The Berenstain Bears Play Ball	Papa Bear/Narrator	Voice, Television specials
1983	Tiger Town	Buddy	TV movie
1985–1988	Spenser: For Hire	Sgt. Frank Belson	65 episodes
1987	The Father Clements Story	O'Hare	TV movie
1990	Cop Rock	Detective Lieutenant Ralph Ruskin	12 episodes
1991	A Little Piece of Heaven	Agent Mr. Jack Daniels	TV movie
1991–2008	Law & Order	Scoler/Judge William Wright	7 episodes
1996	Champs	Coach Harris	12 episodes
2000	Sex and the City	Dr. Talley	Episode: "Hot Child in the City"
2000–2002	Courage the Cowardly Dog	The General / Police / Additional voices	Voice, 39 episodes
2005	Law & Order: Trial by Jury	Judge William Wright	Episode: "Truth or Consequences"
2005	Trump Unauthorized	Fred Trump	TV movie
2005	Into the Fire	Walter Hartwig Sr.	TV movie
2006	Law & Order: Special Victims Unit	Judge Joseph Malloy	Episode: "Infected"
2008	The Return of Jezebel James	Ronald Tompkins	7 episodes (3 aired episodes)
2013	Person of Interest	Lou Mitchell	Episode: "All In"

=== Videogames ===
Year	Title	Role	Notes
2003	Batman: Dark Tomorrow	Commissioner James Gordon	

== Audiobooks ==
A partial list:

Title	Author	Un-/Abridged	Read by	Published
The Memory of Running	Ron McLarty	UNABRIDGED	Ron McLarty	2004-01-16
Zero Day	David Baldacci	UNABRIDGED	Ron McLarty, Orlagh Cassidy*	2011-04-11
Brian's Hunt	Gary Paulsen	UNABRIDGED	Ron McLarty	2003-12-23
The Gift	Danielle Steel	UNABRIDGED	Ron McLarty	2012-07-20
'Salem's Lot	Stephen King	UNABRIDGED	Ron McLarty	2008-02-05
Blaze	Stephen King	UNABRIDGED	Ron McLarty	2008-01-22
Valhalla Rising: A Dirk Pitt Adventure	Clive Cussler	ABRIDGED	Ron McLarty	2001-08-13
The Great Brain	John D. Fitzgerald	UNABRIDGED	Ron McLarty	2002-05-28
Miracles and Massacres	Glenn Beck	UNABRIDGED	Ron McLarty	2013-11
Decision Points	George W. Bush	UNABRIDGED	Ron McLarty	2010-11-08
The Longest Ride	Nicholas Sparks	UNABRIDGED	Ron McLarty, January LaVoy	2013-09-17

- McLarty and Cassidy also narrated books 2 and 3 in the John Puller series, The Forgotten and The Escape.
