= Knowl Johnson =

American actor

- Born: September 16, 1970 (age 55); Greenwich, Connecticut, United States
- Occupation: Voice actor/actor
- Years active: 1981–1991

Knowl Johnson (born September 16, 1970) is an American actor. He is known for his vocal work as Brother Bear in several of the Berenstain Bears television specials such as The Berenstain Bears' Easter Surprise (1981), The Berenstain Bears' Comic Valentine (1982), and The Berenstain Bears Play Ball (1983).

== Film credits ==
Aside from his voice acting career, Johnson has appeared in several motion pictures, including Steel Magnolias (1989), Lean on Me (1989) and Toy Soldiers (1991).
