= The Berenstain Bears (1985 TV series) =

1985 American-Australian TV series or program

- Genre: Children's series Comedy
- Based on: Berenstain Bears by Stan and Jan Berenstain
- Developed by: Joe Cates
- Directed by: Buzz Potamkin
- Creative director: Chris Cuddington
- Voices of: Ruth Buzzi; Brian Cummings; David Mendenhall; Christina Lange; Frank Welker; Josh Rodine; Marissa Mendenhall
- Theme music composer: John Philip Sousa (melody)
- Opening theme: "We Are The Berenstain Bears" performed by the cast
- Ending theme: "We Are The Berenstain Bears" (instrumental)
- Composer: Elliot Lawrence
- Countries of origin: Australia; United States
- Original language: English
- No. of seasons: 2
- No. of episodes: 26 (list of episodes)

Production
- Producer: Buzz Potamkin
- Editor: Robert Ciaglia
- Running time: 22 minutes
- Production companies: The Joseph Cates Company; Southern Star/Hanna-Barbera Australia

Original release
- Network: CBS
- Release: September 14, 1985 – December 6, 1986

Related
- The Berenstain Bears Play Ball; The Berenstain Bears (2002 TV series)

The Berenstain Bears Show (also known as "The Berenstain Bears") is an animated children's television series aimed at preschool and elementary school children, based on the children's book series of the same name by Stan and Jan Berenstain, produced by Southern Star/Hanna-Barbera Australia. It aired in the United States from September 14, 1985, to December 6, 1986 on CBS with 26 half-hour episodes (or 52 11-minute shorts) produced. Reruns of the show would continue to air on the network until September 5, 1987. Each show consisted of two episodes, the first being an adaptation of one of the books, the second being an original story.

The series was nominated in 1987 for a Daytime Emmy award for Outstanding Performer in Children's Programming; it was also nominated that year for a Humanitas Prize in the category of Non-Prime Time Children's Animated Show.

A second Berenstain Bears series aired on Treehouse TV in Canada from 2002 to 2003 and on PBS Kids in the United States from 2003 to 2004, but produced in Toronto by Nelvana Limited.

== Plot ==
The series is set in a forested land populated only by anthropomorphic bears and primarily centers around the Berenstain Bears. The Berenstain Bears are a family residing in the rural community of Bear Country. The family consists of Papa Q. Bear, his wife, Mama Bear, and their two cubs, Brother and Sister Bear. The series teaches lessons, continues from the TV specials, and expands Bear Country as well as character development. Each episode follows the struggles of the family, mainly the cubs (siblings).

The characters and setting are from various books written by Stan & Jan Berenstain as well as from several television specials by Joe Cates. Other characters are Actual Factual, Big Paw, Mayor Horace J. Honeypot, Farmer Ben, Cousin Fred, and Grizzly Gramps & Gran.

Characters also added are Officer Marguerete, Scout Leader Jane, Lizzy Bruin, Queen Nectar, and Old Jake the Catfish (Queen Nectar and Jake are not bears, but they do talk and interact with the cubs).

The occasional main antagonists of the series are the "swindler" con artist Raffish Ralph and sometimes Weasel McGreed, seen in only six episodes. To a lesser extent, Too-Tall Grizzly is another antagonist, albeit a minor one, serving as the school bully.

Other episodes involve "The Bear Detectives" and their sniffer hound, Snuff, Papa Q. Bear's attempts of honey collecting, interaction with forest animals, and attempts by Weasel McGreed to take over Bear Country.

== Voice cast ==
The main shot from the opening, showing all four main characters.

- Brian Cummings as Papa Q. Bear, Actual Factual, Bigpaw, Horace J. Honeypot, Too-Tall, additional voices
- Ruth Buzzi as Mama Bear, Grizzly Gran, Scout Leader Jane, Queen Nectar, Teacher Jane, additional voices
- David Mendenhall as Brother Bear
- Christina Lange as Sister Bear
- Marissa Mendenhall as Lizzy Bruin, additional voices
- Josh Rodine as Cousin Fred
- John Stephenson as Billy Bunny
- Frank Welker as Raffish Ralph, Weasel McGreed, Snuff, Grizzly Gramps, Farmer Ben, Mr. Skunk, additional voices

== Episodes ==
Season	Episodes	Originally released	
Season	Episodes	First released	Last released
1	13	September 14, 1985	December 7, 1985
2	13	September 13, 1986	December 6, 1986

== Production ==
From 1979 to 1983, The Berenstain Bears made their first television introduction on a series of holiday specials that aired on NBC. The specials were created and written by Stan & Jan Berenstain, produced by Joe Cates, and directed by Buzz Potamkin. They continued to make one holiday special each year for five years.

After the release of The Berenstain Bears Play Ball, the team began developing a TV series based on the books and to a lesser extent, the same TV specials produced. Joe Cates and Buzz Potamkin produced this TV series as well and Elliott Lawrence continuing to score the music for the episodes which were based on his compositions from the five specials, but in a faster tempo. Some of the production staff who worked on the specials would continue to help out on the show's development. In addition to creating the original books, Stan and Jan Berenstain were producers on the show, and wrote some of the scripts.

Since Joe Cates was responsible for contracting NBC to fund the TV specials, he tried to pitch the show to the network, but his efforts would be ineffective due to a change in network leadership at the time. However, CBS got interested in the project and would soon strike a deal to pick up the series for a first 13-episode season as an attempt to lure a new audience for their Saturday morning "Kids Just Wanna Have Fun" lineup. The series noticeably taught life lessons through 80s era storytelling.

In addition to adapting existing works, CBS executives wanted the series to have an original story tied in to the episodes. Rumoredly, some of the pre-existing episodes that were planned (mainly the adaptation of the books "Too Much TV" and "Too Much Junk Food") were turned down by the executives because of unhealthy habits. Many of the original segments would end up being turned into books.

The program was produced by Southern Star Productions/Hanna-Barbera Australia with new voice actors. The characters do not talk in rhyme, and the TV series has an updated appearance, 80s synth-tunes, no longer carrying the rustic design of the earliest books. The series expanded tremendously on Bear Country which includes many characters and landmarks as well as the economy and government. As a result, the episodes have faster timing, and the characters seem much busier compared with the TV specials. The stories are now told without a narrator and are 11–12 minutes in length.

One of the major focuses on the program was Papa Bear as the comic relief, more so than he was in the books. Stan Berenstain was not a fan of this, thus explaining that Papa Bear came off as a "selfish, bumbling idiot." He was more complimentary of the way Papa Bear was portrayed in the 2002 TV series.

Some of the characters that were introduced on the TV series, such as Raffish Ralph, would be featured in future books.

== Broadcast ==
The show aired briefly on TLC's Ready Set Learn! block from November 2, 1998 to January 8, 1999, when a contract dispute forced TLC to pull the show off the schedule.

During the early-mid 2000s, reruns were later seen on the DIC Kids Network syndicated programming block which primarily aired on some stations of FOX, the also now-defunct UPN, and The WB, but the episodes were edited and time-compressed by DIC (now known as WildBrain). The series hasn't been seen on American broadcast television since late 2008.

In Australia, where Southern Star is based in, the series aired on Network Ten.

== Home media releases ==
A few episodes were released on VHS and then in later years DVD from various home entertainment labels, such as Random House Home Video, Goldstar Video, Feature Films for Families and Sony Pictures Home Entertainment (formerly known as Columbia TriStar Home Entertainment), albeit with slight alterations (such as an alternate design for the episode title cards).

All of the episodes are available to watch for free on YouTube via the official Berenstain Bears channel, though with varied video quality.
