= Berenstain Bears =

Children's book series by Stan and Jan Berenstain

- Author: Stan and Jan Berenstain (1962–2012); Mike Berenstain (2012–present)
- Illustrator: Stan and Jan Berenstain; Mike Berenstain
- Cover artist: Stan and Jan Berenstain; Mike Berenstain
- Country: United States
- Language: English
- Genre: Children's literature
- Publisher: Random House, Harper
- Published: 1962–present
- No. of books: 400

The Berenstain Bears is a children's literature franchise created by Stan and Jan Berenstain and continued by their son, Mike Berenstain. The books feature a family of anthropomorphic grizzly bears who generally learn a moral or safety-related lesson in the course of each story.

Since the 1962 debut of the first Berenstain Bears book, The Big Honey Hunt, the series has grown to over 400 titles, which have sold approximately 260 million copies in 23 languages. The Berenstain Bears franchise has also expanded well beyond the books, encompassing television series and a wide variety of other products and licenses. While enjoying decades of popularity and receiving numerous awards, the series has been criticized for its perceived saccharine tone and formulaic storytelling.

== History ==
Stanley Berenstain and Janice Grant met in 1941, on their first day of drawing class at the Philadelphia Museum School of Industrial Art, where they formed an immediate bond. After being separated during World War II, during which Stan served in the Army as a medical illustrator and Janice worked as a drafter for the United States Army Corps of Engineers and an aircraft riveter, they were reunited and married in 1946. While initially working as art teachers, the Berenstains pursued a joint career in cartooning and gradually found success working together on illustrations, humorous sketches and cover art for publications including The Saturday Review of Literature, Collier's, McCall's, Good Housekeeping, and The Saturday Evening Post. In 1951, they published Berenstains' Baby Book, a humorous how-to aimed at adults and based on their experiences raising their infant son Leo in downtown Philadelphia. Nearly two dozen other books followed; described by Stan as "cartoon essays", the titles included Marital Blitz, How To Teach Your Children About Sex Without Making A Complete Fool of Yourself, and Have A Baby, My Wife Just Had A Cigar!

In the early 1960s, the Berenstains sought to enter the field of writing for young children. For their first children's book, they chose to cast bears as the main characters, primarily because "bears are furry and appealing." Stan also observed that female bears are "terrifyingly good mothers" while the males are "lousy fathers". (The Berenstains did not consider the similarity to their last name in making the choice) In their 2002 memoir, they said that they knew from the start that their book would "have three characters: a bluff, overenthusiastic Papa Bear who wore bib overalls and a plaid shirt and ...a wise Mama Bear who wore a blue dress with white polka dots ... and a bright, lively little cub."

The Berenstains' first bear story, titled Freddy Bear's Spanking, arrived on the desk of Theodor Geisel, better known as Dr. Seuss, who had found phenomenal success in 1957 with The Cat in the Hat and was now editor of a Random House series called "Beginner Books". Geisel took on the manuscript, but spent the next two years ruthlessly challenging the Berenstains to make improvements to the writing and structure and to connect with their characters on a deeper level. He asked questions such as "What kind of pipe tobacco does Papa Bear smoke?" and urged them to analyze the relationship between Papa Bear and Small Bear, to which Stan responded, mystified, "Well, he's the father, and he's the son"; however, Jan attributed the inspiration for the characters' dynamic to the 1931 film The Champ.

The Big Honey Hunt in its original 1962 publication, left, and its 2002 reissue

The book was finally published in 1962 under the title The Big Honey Hunt, with no plans to revisit the bears in a sequel. Geisel had told the Berenstains to feature a different animal in their next story, as "there are already too many bears ... Sendak's got some kind of bear. There's Yogi Bear, the Three Bears, Smokey Bear, the Chicago Bears ... for your next book you should do something as different from bears as possible." They had started work on a new project featuring a penguin when Geisel called and told them: "We're selling the hell out of the bear book." The second bear book, The Bike Lesson, appeared in 1964, featuring the names Stan and Jan Berenstain instead of Stanley and Janice; Geisel had changed the credit without consulting them. Geisel was also responsible for adding the name "Berenstain Bears" to the covers of the book.

Over the next several decades, Stan and Jan collaborated on hundreds of books from their home studio outside Philadelphia. After developing a storyline together, one of them (usually Stan) would develop a first draft, which the other would then refine into an 1100-word manuscript. They also worked together on the illustrations. In 2002, the couple released a memoir of their career titled Down A Sunny Dirt Road.

Their sons Leo and Mike also entered the family business. Mike became a published author and illustrator starting in 1976, and Leo published a book of short stories in 1992. In the 1990s, the men worked on the Berenstain Bears "Big Chapter Book" series (published under the names Stan and Jan Berenstain). Following Stan's death from lymphoma in 2005, Mike collaborated with his mother on writing and illustrating Berenstain Bears installments, while Leo has been involved with the business side of the franchise. Jan Berenstain died in February 2012 following a stroke. Mike Berenstain continues to write and illustrate new books in the series and has incorporated faith-based themes in recent years.

== Characters ==
The Berenstain Bears: Papa (top right), Mama (top left), Brother (bottom right), Sister (bottom left), Honey (center)

The Berenstain Bears, who reside "in a big treehouse down a sunny dirt road deep in Bear Country", consists of Papa Bear, an over-eager, bumbling carpenter; wise Mama Bear, a housewife and perfectionist; and their children, Brother Bear (originally Small Bear), and later additions Sister Bear and Honey Bear. Sister Bear was introduced in the 1974 book The Berenstain Bears' New Baby. Honey Bear's imminent arrival was announced in early 2000 in The Birds, the Bees, and the Berenstain Bears, along with a reader contest to name the new bear; her birth was featured later that year in The Berenstain Bears and Baby Makes Five.

The early Beginner Books about the bears generally follow a basic formula, so described by the Berenstains: "Papa sets out to instruct Small Bear in some aspect of the art of living and ends up badly the worse for wear, with Small Bear expressing his appreciation for the fine lesson Papa has taught him." According to The Washington Post's Paul Farhi, "The action usually starts when the kids face a problem. They turn to Papa, who offers a "solution" that only makes the problem—or the kids' fears about it—even worse. Enter Mama, who eventually sets everyone straight."

== Themes ==
The litany of issues confronted by the Berenstain Bears over their fifty years of publication includes bullying, messiness, poor sportsmanship, visiting the dentist, online safety, and childhood obesity, among countless others. The Berenstains often drew inspiration from their own family experiences, which Stan credited for the series' continued relevance: "Kids still tell fibs and they mess up their rooms and they still throw tantrums in the supermarket ... Nobody gets shot. No violence. There are problems, but they're the kind of typical family problems everyone goes through." The couple also pointed out, in response to criticism of the characterization of Papa and Mama Bear, that the characters were heavily inspired by Stan and Jan Berenstain themselves.

== Reception ==
The Berenstain Bears series had sold over 240 million copies by 2003. Of their books, 35 are in the Publishers Weekly top 250 titles of all time, and 15 are in the top 100 children's paperbacks. The series has received praise and awards for its contributions to children's literature as well as condemnation for promoting outdated gender roles, simplistic and unrealistic messages, and not keeping up with the times.

=== Criticism ===
Critics of the series have called it "syrupy", "unsatisfying", "infuriatingly formulaic", "hokey", "abominable", and "little more than stern lectures dressed up as children's stories".

Upon the death of Stan Berenstain in 2005, The Washington Post published an "Appreciation" piece which many Post readers found surprisingly unappreciative in its tone. Written by Paul Farhi, who had previously rebuked the Berenstain Bears as the most popular example of a lamentable and misguided "self-help" genre aimed at children, the 2005 piece revived his earlier sentiments:

The larger questions about the popularity of the Berenstain Bears are more troubling: Is this what we really want from children's books in the first place, a world filled with scares and neuroses and problems to be toughed out and solved? And if it is, aren't the Berenstain Bears simply teaching to the test, providing a lesson to be spit back, rather than one lived and understood and embraced? Where is the warmth, the spirit of discovery and imagination in Bear Country? Stan Berenstain taught a million lessons to children, but subtlety and plain old joy weren't among them.

Subsequent letters from readers condemned Farhi for expressing such harshness toward the recently deceased; one wrote, "In the name of fairness, please be sure to allow the Berenstain family the opportunity to someday retort in Farhi's obituary." Readers also defended the books' "warmth" and their enduring popularity among young children.

Slate's Hanna Rosin drew criticism for the writing of Jan Berenstain's death, "As any right-thinking mother will agree, good riddance. Among my set of mothers the series is known mostly as the one that makes us dread the bedtime routine the most." (Rosin subsequently apologized and admitted she "was not really thinking of [Berenstain] as a person with actual feelings and a family, just an abstraction who happened to write these books".)

=== Awards and praise ===
The Berenstain Bears series has been awarded the Ludington Award from the Educational Paperback Association for their contribution to children's literature, the Drexel Citation from Drexel University, several Philadelphia Literary Children's Roundtable Honors, and many other state reading association awards. Following Jan Berenstain's death in 2012, acclaimed children's author Jerry Spinelli said that "the Berenstains made a wonderful and lasting contribution to children's literature". Author and professor Donna Jo Napoli said, "Those bears have helped so many children through so many kinds of challenges that kids face, in such a cheerful and kind of energetic way." The Washington Post's Alexandra Petri wrote that the books were "timeless, timely, and kind-hearted, like all the best literature", and acknowledged the Post's 1989 piece by saying, "This is one of the times the kids have the right idea and Charles Krauthammer does not."

== Franchise ==
Since the Berenstain Bears' creation, the characters have been widely licensed for a broad array of products. The franchise exploded in size in the 1980s, when King Features began aggressively promoting the Bears to marketers amidst a surge in popularity following a series of animated television specials. As of 1983, the Berenstain Bears had been licensed to approximately 40 companies for more than 150 types of products, with projected annual sales of $50 million.

=== Television ===
From top: the 1979 special The Berenstain Bears' Christmas Tree; the 1985 series; the 2002 series.

The Berenstain Bears first appeared on television in five animated specials on NBC, airing as follows:

- The Berenstain Bears' Christmas Tree (December 3, 1979)
- The Berenstain Bears Meet Bigpaw (November 20, 1980)
- The Berenstain Bears' Easter Surprise (April 14, 1981)
- The Berenstain Bears' Valentine Special (promotional title) (broadcast as The Berenstain Bears' Comic Valentine and released on home video as The Berenstain Bears and Cupid's Surprise) (February 13, 1982)
- The Berenstain Bears' Littlest Leaguer (also called The Berenstain Bears Play Ball) (May 6, 1983)

The first special starred Ron McLarty, Gabriela Glatzer, Jonathan Lewis, and Pat Lysinger as Papa, Sister, Brother and Mama, respectively. Most reprised their roles in the subsequent specials.

From 1985 through 1986, an animated series titled The Berenstain Bears Show aired as part of CBS' Saturday-morning cartoon block. The series was nominated in 1987 for a Daytime Emmy Award for Outstanding Performer in Children's Programming; it was also nominated that year for a Humanitas Prize in the category of Non-Prime Time Children's Animated Show.

A second TV series, also called The Berenstain Bears, debuted on Treehouse TV in 2002, then on PBS, a year after. The series was produced by the Canadian company Nelvana and consisted of 40 30-minute episodes adapted from the books. However, the series are considered separate adaptations and were never aired together. Even though the 2002 series is not a remake but a continuation of the episodes, some characters' personalities changed while other characters no longer appeared. (However, new characters appeared.) The original specials and TV series have a rustic design and interaction with other forest animals, while the Nelvana series completely embraced rural life with slower timing. Although Canadian laws required Nelvana to employ only Canadian writers and artists, the Berenstains provided detailed reviews of each script. They also sought to exert their influence on some details, according to Stan. "Our bears don't wear shoes, and Papa wouldn't wear his hat in the house ... And we try to keep complete, total banality out of the stories." Common practicalities of animation did force some minor costume changes from the books, such as eliminating polka dots and plaids. (This issue also occurred in previous animated series and specials. Only a limited amount of polka dots was allowed in the five specials.) The show's theme song is performed by Lee Ann Womack.

In 2011, 20 episodes of the Nelvana series were dubbed in the Native American Lakota language and began airing on public television in North and South Dakota under the title Matȟó Waúŋšila Thiwáhe ("The Compassionate Bear Family"). The translated series was a collaboration of the Standing Rock Indian Reservation and the nonprofit Lakota Language Consortium, with Mike Berenstain and Nelvana waiving all licensing fees for the venture. The Berenstain Bears is the first animated series to be translated into a Native American language in the United States.

=== Software and video games ===
Several computer games and other software adaptations of the Berenstain Bears books have been released, including the following:

- 1983: Berenstain Bears, by Coleco for the Atari 2600 gaming system. A rare and collectible cartridge that was playable only with the KidVid controller accessory.
- 1990: Berenstain Bears Learn About Counting, MS-DOS game to teach counting.
- 1990: Berenstain Bears: Junior Jigsaw, MS-DOS game featuring putting together a simple jigsaw puzzle.
- 1991: Berenstain Bears: Fun With Colors, MS-DOS game that teaches basic colors.
- 1992: Berenstain Bears Learning Essentials, MS-DOS game that teaches pre-school knowledge.
- 1993: Berenstain Bears On Their Own: And You On Your Own, a CD-i game.
- 1993: The Berenstain Bears: Learning At Home, Volume 1, computer software from Compton's New Media. Noted for requiring "a whopping 20 megabytes of hard-disk space".
- 1993: Berenstain Bears Treehouse Classroom, MS-DOS game.
- 1993: The Berenstain Bears: Learning At Home, Volume 2, computer software from Compton's New Media.
- 1994: Berenstain Bears Learn About Letters, computer software from Softprime Inc. Reviewed by The New York Times as "mediocre".
- 1994: The Berenstain Bears' Camping Adventure, for the Game Gear and Genesis, as part of their "Sega Club" children's lineup.
- 1994: Berenstain Bears: A School Day, a video game for the Sega Pico. A Sega Genesis demo was distributed via Sega Channel.
- 1995: The Berenstain Bears Get in a Fight, computer software from Random House/Broderbund as part of the Living Books series. An animated point-and-click adaptation of the book of the same name, featuring a brief video interview with the Berenstains. The Milwaukee Journal said, "The quality of the disc's illustrations and the bluegrass banjo soundtrack by Tony Furtado are first-rate." Living Books later released a second Berenstain Bears installment, The Berenstain Bears in the Dark.
- 1996: Berenstain Bears in the Dark, for Windows.
- 1999: Life's Little Lessons with the Berenstain Bears: Clean Up, Pick Up, and Recycle, Microsoft Windows game.
- 2000: Extreme Sports with the Berenstain Bears, video game from Sound Source Interactive for the Game Boy Color. It was included on a list of the "20 Worst Video Games Ever Made" by Electronic Gaming Monthly.
- 2001: Berenstain Bears and the Spooky Old Tree, video game for the Nintendo Game Boy Advance.
- 2005: Life's Little Lessons with the Berenstain Bears: When Little Bears are Scaredy Bears, Microsoft Windows game.
- 2006: Life's Little Lessons with the Berenstain Bears: Little Bears Make Big Helpers, Microsoft Windows game.

=== Museum exhibits ===
In late 2002, an exhibit titled "The Berenstain Bears Celebrate: The Art of Stan and Jan Berenstain" opened at the James A. Michener Art Museum in the Berenstains' home of Bucks County, Pennsylvania. Organized by the Norman Rockwell Museum in Stockbridge, Massachusetts, and timed to coincide with the release of the Berenstains' memoir Down A Sunny Dirt Road, the exhibit provided a retrospective of the couple's artwork, influences and techniques, as well as the evolution of their famous bears. The exhibit was subsequently hosted by the Rockwell Museum in 2003.

In 2005, the Lied Discovery Children's Museum in Las Vegas, Nevada, opened "Growing Up With the Berenstain Bears", an exhibition offering children the chance to experience life-size versions of Bear Country landmarks. The Youth Museum Exhibit Collaborative and the Berenstains themselves assisted in the exhibit's development. The exhibition visited eight other museums in the United States and Canada before returning to Lied Discovery Children's Museum in 2010.

The National Museum of Play in Rochester, New York, is host to a permanent exhibit, "The Berenstain Bears – Down a Sunny Dirt Road". Opened in 2008, the original exhibition features interactive 3D playsets such as Mama Bear's Quilt Shop, Papa Bear's Woodworking Shop, and Dr. Bearson's Dentist Office.

=== Stage show ===
The off-Broadway musical The Berenstain Bears LIVE! in Family Matters, the Musical debuted in June 2011 at MMAC (Manhattan Movie and Arts Center) in New York City, after having toured the country in an earlier version. Originally scheduled to run from June to September 4, the show was extended through October and subsequently moved to the Marjorie S. Deane Little Theatre for an open-ended run. The show was produced by Berenstain fan Matt Murphy, whose previous work included Memphis and Altar Boyz. Improper Magazine called it "a genuinely enjoyable and enriching experience for kids", while The New York Times said that "little theatergoers will enjoy the actors" but the story was "a bit too tidy and tame".

=== Cancelled feature film ===
A planned Berenstain Bears feature film adaptation was announced in 2009 by Walden Media and director Shawn Levy, whose company 21 Laps would produce the film. The project was envisioned as a comedy with both live action and animated elements, and an original storyline that would combine details from several Berenstain books. "I'd like the film to be un-ironic about its family connections but have a wry comedic sensibility that isn't oblivious to the fact that they're bears", Levy said. Comparing it to the film Elf, Levy said he thought the Berenstain Bears film would be "witty but never sarcastic". As of January 2012, the project was reportedly in the script phase, but the company's option has since expired.

=== Social issues ===
In 2007, the Berenstain Bears became the "spokesbears" for Prevent Child Abuse America. Said PCA America President and CEO Jim Hmurovich: "This is a great example of a socially conscious and child-focused business taking a stand on an issue that has great consequences for all of us. This helps us begin having a more honest conversation about how each of us has a role to prevent the abuse and neglect of our nation's children."

The Berenstains were approached by former U.S. Surgeon General C. Everett Koop, who asked them to write an anti-smoking book for children. They declined, but the idea did lead to a 1988 book about peer pressure, The Berenstain Bears and the Double Dare. In 1997, they published The Berenstain Bear Scouts and the Sinister Smoke Ring; Florida governor Lawton Chiles purchased 600,000 copies of the book to distribute to children as part of his anti-smoking campaign.

Beginning in 2008, a number of Berenstain Bears titles of a specifically religious nature have been released by Mike Berenstain. These include The Berenstain Bears: God Loves You, The Berenstain Bears Say Their Prayers and a Berenstain Bears Bible – Complete New International Reader's Version written at a third-grade reading level. The titles are part of a series called Living Lights and are published by the Christian company Zondervan and HarperCollins.

In August 2012, the publishers of the series faced controversy regarding the fast food restaurant Chick-fil-A's plan to distribute titles in the series as part of a kids' meal promotion, with gay rights advocates urging the publishers to pull out of the promotion, due to the Chick-fil-A founder's controversial statements regarding same-sex marriage. HarperCollins went ahead with the promotion, stating that it was not their "practice to cancel a contract with an author, or any other party, for exercising their first amendment rights."

=== Other products ===
In the 1980s, the prominent vaccine manufacturer Lederle Laboratories licensed the Berenstain Bears for a promotional campaign encouraging children to get vaccinated. As part of the campaign, Lederle distributed Berenstain Bears stuffed animals and books to every pediatrician's office in the United States.

In the 1990s and 2000s, many Cedar Fair theme parks, including Cedar Point, featured kids' play areas called "Berenstain Bear Country" that were themed to the franchise. The Berenstain Bears could also be found at the parks as costumed characters.

A musical album titled The Berenstain Bears Save Christmas: The Musical! was released by Good Mood Records in 2006. Adapted from the 2003 book The Berenstain Bears Save Christmas, the album teamed the Berenstains with the father-son composing team of Elliot Lawrence and Jamie Broza, the former of whom composed music for the holiday television specials and original television series.

Other products that have featured the Berenstain Bears include clothing, Happy Meals, cereal, chocolate, crackers, greeting cards, puzzles, embroidery kits, and notepads.

== Name discrepancy ==
Many people incorrectly remember the name of the series as the "Berenstein Bears". This confusion has generated multiple explanations of the memories, including an unannounced name change, time travel, or parallel universes, and has been described as an instance of the Mandela effect. According to Mike Berenstain, confusion over the name has existed since his father's childhood, when a teacher told him there was no such name as "Berenstain" and the correct spelling was "Bernstein". A few examples of the "Berenstein" spelling have been found in references to and knockoffs of official merchandise and publications, and cartoons for the series used an ambiguous pronunciation which may contribute to the false memory.
