= Elliot Lawrence =

American jazz pianist and bandleader (1925–2021)

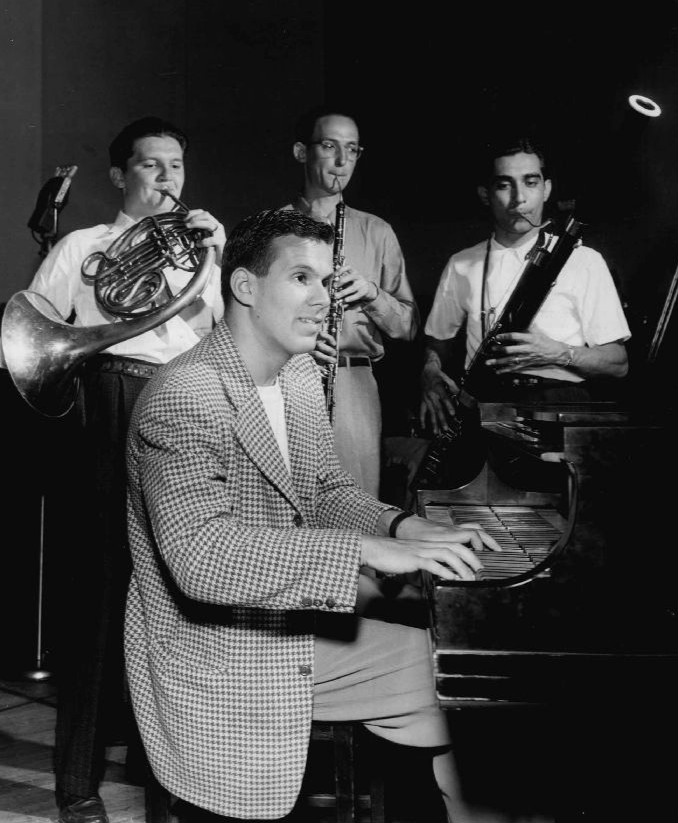
- Lawrence at the piano with french horn, cor anglais, and bassoon players, 1946

Background information
- Born: Elliot Laurence Broza; February 14, 1925; Philadelphia, Pennsylvania, U.S.
- Died: July 2, 2021 (aged 96) Manhattan, New York, U.S.
- Genres: Jazz, big band
- Occupations: Musician, bandleader
- Instrument: Piano
- Years active: 1940s–2021
- Labels: Columbia, Decca, SESAC, Fantasy, King, Vik

Elliot Lawrence Broza (February 14, 1925 – July 2, 2021), known professionally as Elliot Lawrence, was an American jazz pianist and bandleader.

Son of the broadcaster Stan Lee Broza, Lawrence led his first dance band at age 20, but he played swing at the time its heyday was coming to a close. He recorded copiously as a bandleader for Columbia, Decca, King, Fantasy, Vik, and SESAC between 1946 and 1960. Lawrence was music director for the Tony awards show.

== Life and career ==
Elliot Lawrence was born Elliot Lawrence Broza on February 14, 1925, in Philadelphia, Pennsylvania. His parents, Stan Lee Broza and Esther Broza, were radio and television pioneers. In 1927, they created and produced the Horn and Hardart Children's Hour, which ran on WCAU radio from 1927 to 1958 and concurrently on television from 1948 to 1958. Stan Lee Broza was the first president of the Broadcast Pioneers of Philadelphia from 1962 to 1963. Stan Lee hosted the Children's Hour and Esther produced it. Celebrities who appeared on the show as children include Eddie Fisher, Frankie Avalon, Joey Bishop, Bernadette Peters and best selling author Jacqueline Susann. The idea for the Children's Hour came to Stan Lee when a new shopping mall in Philadelphia was looking to sponsor a show on the radio. He had the idea of creating a variety show in which talented children would sing and perform. While looking for sponsors, one of Stan Lee's first customers was William S. Paley, who bought advertising time on WCAU for his father's cigar shop. William Paley went on to become the chairman of CBS. Stan Lee Broza and Esther Broza were pioneers of broadcasting and of the variety show. Both are in the Philadelphia Broadcasters Hall of Fame.

Lawrence grew up in this show business environment and began studying piano at the age of three. His first public performance was at age four conducting the orchestra on the Children's Hour stage show. At the age of six he wrote his first composition, "Falling Down Stairs," and was stricken with polio. Lawrence suffered from the illness for six months, after which he recovered. By the age of 12, Elliot had formed his first band, a 15-piece unit called The Band Busters, and had already begun doing club dates on the weekends. Elliot finished high school at age 16 and entered the University of Pennsylvania. During his junior year his band, now named The Elliot Broza Orchestra, began playing college proms around Pennsylvania. At Penn, he majored in symphonic conducting under Harl McDonald, who offered him a position as assistant conductor of the Philadelphia Orchestra upon graduation. In 1944, after three years at Penn, Elliot graduated with a Bachelor of Music degree and received the Thornton Oakely Award, given each year to the undergraduate who has contributed most to the arts.

Elliot took the name Elliot Lawrence to distinguish himself from his family name when he became the music director of WCAU'S House Band in 1945. The band premiered on the radio on January 18, 1945, as The Elliot Lawrence Orchestra in a weekly half-hour broadcast "Listen to Lawrence." The Elliot Lawrence Band, of which he was the piano player and leader, soon incorporated classical instruments like oboe, French horn, English horn and bassoon. Listen to Lawrence was nationally broadcast on CBS radio in 1945 shortly after a rave review in the March 1945 issue of Metronome magazine by George T. Simon. Elliot's theme song was "Heart to Heart."

From 1946 to 1954, Lawrence's Band toured, performing at dances, concerts, college proms, and headline gigs around the United States year round, while recording albums for Decca, Columbia, RCA, Fantasy, and Vik records. In 1949, the band performed a three-week stint with the Nat King Cole Trio at the Paramount Theater in New York City, during which time it recorded Gerry Mulligan's "Elevation," later named "one of the top 50 best jazz recordings of the 20th century" by the Smithsonian Institution. The Elliot Lawrence Band performed in Philadelphia at the World Series in 1950, playing his original song "The Fightin' Phils." By this time, however, the band had become known for their "sweet" commercial sound. From 1947 to 1949 the band was the "campus choice" in Billboard's most promising new orchestra polls. Elliot was also voted one of America's "most eligible bachelors" by Look magazine in 1949.

Recording landed him in New York City in 1955 where, as the big band era came to a close, the Ray Bloch agency signed Elliot to a contract and he began to do radio shows such as The Red Buttons show and the Jack Sterling Show as well as weekend gigs with his big band. He was a host of the DuMont Television Network program Melody Street (1953–1954). In 1953 he was asked to go to the Soviet Union with The Ed Sullivan Show to be part of the first American band to broadcast from the Soviet Union. On the show were Marge and Gower Champion, the well known dancing and theatrical couple. Gower asked Elliot to be the musical director of his next show, Bye Bye Birdie (1960) for which he was nominated for a Tony award. In 1959, he conducted in the Naumburg Orchestral Concerts, in the Naumburg Bandshell, Central Park, in the summer series.

After 1960, Lawrence gave up jazz and began composing and arranging for television, film, and stage. He won the Tony Award for his second show, How to Succeed in Business Without Really Trying in 1962. This led to a 16-year career as a Broadway Conductor and musical director and later to his almost 50-year career as the "go to" conductor for big television events and specials.

=== Television ===
Among his many television credits, Elliot was the musical director and conductor for every Tony Award telecast from 1965 (its first year on television) to 2011, and other big gala shows like Night of the 100 Stars 1 (1982) 1 and 2 (1985), the Bicentennial Celebration for the Statue of Liberty (1986 at Giants Stadium) and The Kennedy Center Honors (from 2000 to 2006).

=== Film ===
As a composer, Elliot Lawrence scored the movies Network and The French Connection.

== Awards ==
As a musical director Elliot won nine Emmy awards for musical direction and been nominated for many others.

== Personal life ==
In 1956 on a blind date in New York City, Elliot met Amy Jane Bunim. They were married three months later. Elliot and Amy had four children: Alexandra, Daniel, James and Mariana (Mia). They were still married.

He died on July 2, 2021, at the age of 96 in Manhattan.

== Discography ==
- Dream with the Elliot Lawrence Orchestra (Fantasy, 1956)
- The Honey Dreamers with the Elliot Lawrence Orchestra Sing Gershwin (Fantasy, 1956)
- Plays Tiny Kahn and Johnny Mandel Arrangements (Fantasy, 1956)
- Plays Gerry Mulligan Arrangements (Fantasy, 1956)
- Big Band Modern (Jazztone, 1957)
- Swinging at the Steel Pier (Vogue, 1956)
- Elliot Lawrence Plays for Swinging Dancers (Fantasy, 1957)
- Dream On...Dance On (Fantasy, 1958)
- Hi Fi-ing Winds (Vik, 1958)
- Music for Trapping (Tender, That Is) (Top Rank, 1959)
- Big Band Sound (Fantasy, 1959)
- Elevation (First Heard, 1980)
- The Uncollected Elliot Lawrence and His Orchestra 1946 (Hindsight, 1982)
- The Music of Elliot Lawrence (Mobile Fidelity, 1995)

With Serge Chaloff, Al Cohn, Zoot Sims and Herbie Steward

- The Four Brothers... Together Again! (Vik, 1957)

=== Advertising ===
- N.W. Ayer (music consultant/producer) 1978 – 2002 including the award-winning;
- U.S Army (Be All You Can Be)
- AT&T Reach Out and Touch Someone (composed by David Lucas)

=== Broadway ===
- Bye Bye Birdie 1960
- How to Succeed In Business Without Really Trying 1961
- Here's Love 1963
- Golden Boy 1964
- The Apple Tree 1966
- Golden Rainbow 1968
- La Strada 1969
- 1776 1969
- Georgy 1970
- Sugar 1972

=== Film ===
- The French Connection (first 10 minutes) 1971
- Network 1976
- The Cradle Will Fall 1983

=== Radio ===
- The Jack Sterling Radio Show (1950–1957)
- The Red Buttons Show (1952–1955)

=== Television ===
- The Cavalcade of Stars (series) 1956
- Jazz: It's My Beat 1957
- The State Department Tour of Russia with Ed Sullivan 1959
- The Mighty Heroes 1966 animated series
- Tony Award Show (1967 (first network televised) – 2010)
- That's Life (TV musical sitcom) 1968
- Dames at Sea (1971), TV adaptation of stage musical
- S'wonderful, S'marvelous, S'Gershwin 1972
- The Anne Bancroft Special: Annie and the Hoods 1974
- Search for Tomorrow 1974–1986
- Miss Universe Pageant 1975–1986
- Miss USA Pageant 1975–1986
- The Edge of Night 1976–1984
- Saturday Night Live with Howard Cosell 1976
- The Anne Bancroft Christmas Special 1977
- The David Frost Show 1978
- CBS: On the Air - A Celebration of 50 Years (1978)
- Miss Teenage America 1978, 1979
- The Emmy Awards Show 1978 – 1986
- Texas 1980–1982
- As the World Turns 1981–1993
- Night of 100 Stars 1 (1982) and 2 (1985)
- Parade of Stars 1983
- Cole Porter in Paris 1984
- Guiding Light 1984 – 1986
- The Plácido Domingo Special 1985
- NBC 60th Anniversary Celebration (1986)
- The Berenstain Bears (6 TV specials, 1985–87)
- The Kennedy Center Honors 1987–2005
- Irving Berlin 100th Anniversary Show 1988
- The Goodwill Games 1989, 1990
- The Songwriters Hall of Fame
