= Stan and Jan Berenstain =

American author and illustrator duo

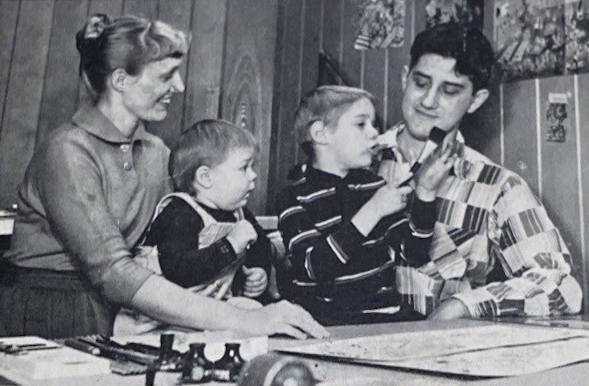
- Jan, Mike, Leo and Stan Berenstain in 1956
- Occupations: Writers; illustrators
- Known for: The Berenstain Bears
- Children: 2, including Mike Berenstain
- Stan Berenstain
- Birth name: Stanley Melvin Berenstain
- Born: September 29, 1923; Philadelphia, Pennsylvania, U.S.
- Died: November 26, 2005 (aged 82); Solebury Township, Pennsylvania, U.S.
- Years active: 1951–2005
- Spouse: Janice Marian Grant (m. 1946)
- Jan Berenstain
- Birth name: Janice Marian Grant
- Born: July 26, 1923; Philadelphia, Pennsylvania, U.S.
- Died: February 24, 2012 (aged 88); Doylestown, Pennsylvania, U.S.
- Years active: 1951–2012
- Spouse: Stanley Melvin Berenstain (m. 1946; died 2005)

Stanley Melvin Berenstain (September 29, 1923 – November 26, 2005) and Janice Marian Berenstain (née Grant; July 26, 1923 – February 24, 2012) were American writers and illustrators best known for creating the children's book series The Berenstain Bears.

Both Stan and Jan were born and raised in Philadelphia, Pennsylvania. Jan attended Radnor High School in Radnor, Pennsylvania. Stan was Jewish and Jan was an Episcopalian. They were married for 59 years until Stan's death in 2005.

== Early careers ==
Stan Berenstain and Janice Grant met on their first day of art school at the Philadelphia Museum School of Industrial Art in 1941. During World War II, Stan served in the Army as a medical illustrator while Jan was a draft artist for the Army Corps of Engineers in addition to working in an aircraft factory. Jan fashioned a pair of wedding rings from spare aluminum collected at the latter job, and the two got married on April 17, 1946.

== Books ==
In an interview about the books, the Berenstains said that a big reason behind their inspiration was some of the experiences parents faced, as well as some childhood tribulations when they were kids themselves. The Berenstains also noted that there were some issues which seemed to appear in every generation, such as kids throwing tantrums in public places, which made important subject matter for their stories. However, they deliberately wanted to steer clear of overly heavy issues, such as violence. In their later years, critics sometimes dismissed the books for having social attitudes stuck in the 1950s along with the bears' clothing styles and penchant for activities such as playing jacks and hopscotch, even though they did change with the times somewhat by introducing things like video games and cell phones.

In 1951, the couple published Berenstains' Baby Book, which dealt with the issues of pregnancy and child-rearing. Although containing practical advice, the book used humor and reminded parents not to take every situation too seriously. They would go on to publish another two books on parenting, How to Teach Your Children About Sex Without Making a Complete Fool of Yourself and What Your Parents Never Told You about Being a Mom or Dad.

== Cartoons and children's books ==
The Berenstains were successful cartoonists with several adult humor books and magazine credits to their names before their first Berenstain Bears book.

They produced together the magazine cartoon feature It's All in the Family from 1956 to 1989 in McCall's and Good Housekeeping. It's All in the Family (unrelated to the similarly named TV series) depicted the antics of a suburban family with mother, father, eldest and youngest sons, and middle daughter. It's All in the Family was not a conventional comic strip in the sense of a sequential progression of panels. Each issue featured a single situation, often seasonally appropriate, such as the daughter preparing, cooking, and serving a family meal for the first time or the costume preparations, rehearsal, and performance of the youngest child's Christmas pageant. Within a given issue, each It's All in the Family drawing was a stand-alone panel with a caption gag, rather than one panel of a sequential strip, but individual panels in order depicted the complete arc (preparation, completion, aftermath) of that issue's family experience.

In the early 1960s, inspired by their children's enthusiasm for Dr. Seuss books, the Berenstains decided to attempt a series with animal protagonists themselves, settling on bears — not because of their surname as was commonly believed, but because "bears are furry and appealing." They published their first book featuring the Berenstain Bears, The Big Honey Hunt, in 1962. At the time, their inspiration, Theodor Geisel (Dr. Seuss), was working as an editor in the children's division of Random House Publishing and eagerly approved the concept. He edited several books in the Berenstain Bears series and created a lasting franchise including many more books, television series, toys, and stage productions. Over 300 books were published in 23 languages.

Jan was inducted into Radnor High School's Hall of Fame on October 20, 2006.

== Personal lives and deaths ==
The Berenstains were married for 59 years until Stan's death from cancer in his home on November 26, 2005. They had two sons, Leo (born 1948) and Mike (born 1951). Mike Berenstain is a writer/illustrator who has been a published author since 1976. He worked with his parents on several Berenstain Bears books, and has continued to create new books in the franchise on his own.

Jan Berenstain died of a stroke on February 24, 2012, at the age of 88.

== Selected works ==
- The Berenstains' Baby Book (1951, MacMillan)
- Sister (1952, Schuman cartoons)
- Tax-Wise (1952, Schuman)
- Marital Blitz (1954, Dutton)
- Baby Makes Four (1956, MacMillan)
- It’s All in the Family (1958, Dutton)
- Lover Boy (1958, MacMillan)
- And Beat Him When He Sneezes (1960, McGraw Hill)
  - Have a Baby, My Wife Just Had a Cigar (1960, Dell, retitled reprint)
- Bedside Lover Boy (1960, Dell)
- Call Me Mrs. (1961, MacMillan)
- It's Still in the Family (1961, Dutton)
- Office Lover Boy (1962, Dell)
- The Facts of Life for Grown-ups (1963, Dell)
- Flipsville-Squareville (1965, Delacorte)
- Mr. Dirty vs. Mrs. Clean (1967, Dell)
- You Could Diet Laughing (1969, Dell)
- Be Good or I'll Belt Ya! (1970, Dell)
- Education Impossible (1970, Dell)
- How to Teach Your Children about Sex without Making a Complete Fool of Yourself (1970, Dutton)
- Never Trust Anyone Over 13 (1970, Bantam)
- How to Teach Your Children about God without Actually Scaring Them out of Their Wits (1971, Dutton)
- Are Parents for Real? (1972, Bantam)
- The Day of the Dinosaur (1987, Random House, First Time Readers); illustrated by Michael Berenstain (Mike)
- After the Dinosaurs (1988, Random House, First Time Readers)
- What Your Parents Never Told You about Being a Mom or Dad (1995) parenting advice
- Down A Sunny Dirt Road (2002) autobiography
- The Berenstain Bears and The Bear Essentials (2005) parenting advice
- Nothing Ever Happens at the South Pole (2012, HarperCollins, published posthumously) children's book
