= John Bartholomew (disambiguation) =

John Bartholomew (1831–1893) was the second in a line of Scottish cartographers which included:

- John Bartholomew Sr. (1805–1861), father of John
- John George Bartholomew (1860–1920), son of John
- John "Ian" Bartholomew (1890–1962), son of John George
- John Christopher Bartholomew (1923–2008), son of Ian

John Bartholomew may also refer to:

- John Bartholomew (priest) (1790–1865), Archdeacon of Barnstaple
- John Bartholomew Gough (1817–1886), American temperance orator
- John Bartholomew (Australian politician) (1858–1928), Queensland parliamentarian
- John Eric Bartholomew (1926–1984), English comedian known by his stage name Eric Morecambe
- John Logan Bartholomew (born 1984), American film and television actor
- John Bartholomew (chess player) (born 1986), American chess player
- John B. Bartholomew (1916–1983), American journalist and radio and television broadcaster
- John Bartholomew (Vermont politician)

== See also ==
- Collins Bartholomew (formerly "John Bartholomew and Son Ltd."), map publishers established by John Senior and John
