= Leslie's directory for Perth and Kinross =

British directory

- Cover page of the 1911–12 edition, by which time the directory's title had been changed from the original
- Categories: Business
- Frequency: Annually
- Founder: D. Leslie
- First issue: 1885 (141 years ago)
- Final issue: 1939 (87 years ago)
- Country: Scotland

Leslie's directory for Perth and Kinross was an annual book of post office directories for Perth and Kinross, published between 1885 and 1939. It included registers of proprietors, gentry, factors, farmers, merchants, public officials and clergy "in the county and vicinity of Perth".

Some issues included an enlarged plan of Perth and its suburbs, prepared from Ordnance Surveys and actual surveys. These were the work of John George Bartholomew, of John Bartholomew and Son, in Edinburgh.

It was initially both compiled and published by D. Leslie, whose office was at 54 and 58 Princes Street in Perth originally, then 20 St John Street (with printing works at 32 to 38 Canal Street). Prior to publishing the directories, Leslie was a cartographer. In 1837, he published a Directory Map of Perth.

After Leslie's retirement, publishing duties passed to (as of at least 1911) Watson & Annandale and (from 1919) K. Annandale.

In 1930, 45 years into its 54-year run, the directory's named changed to Leslie's directory for Perth and Perthshire.
