= Edinburgh Geographical Institute =

Scottish map publisher

Coordinates: 55°56′07″N 3°10′38″W

The Edinburgh Geographical Institute was founded as a map publisher by famed Scottish geographer and cartographer John George Bartholomew in 1888.

== History ==
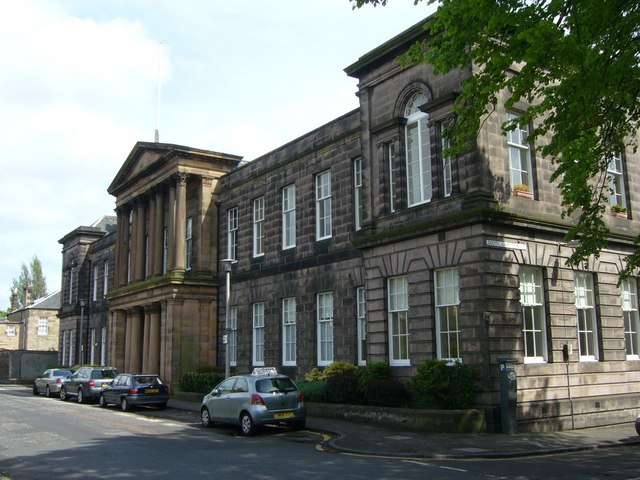
The Edinburgh Geographical Institute building on Duncan Street in Newington, Edinburgh

Around 1826 John Bartholomew Sr. opened a firm dedicated to the production of maps called 'John Bartholomew and Sons'. In 1888, John George Bartholomew, having taken over the company and hoping to create 'a site for the promotion of national geographic knowledge', renamed the publishers to the 'Edinburgh Geographical Institute'.

With the demolition of John's family home, Falcon Hall, the Palladian façade was removed to a new site on Duncan Street in the Newington district of Edinburgh, to serve as the façade of the new Edinburgh Geographical Institute. The name was inscribed into the stone and remains there to this day.

Until 1962 the firm was the Geographer and Cartographer to the King for Scotland.

The Institute continued to produce high quality maps from their new premises until 1989 when they merged with the Glasgow publisher Collins, as part of the multinational HarperCollins Publishers, where the name lives on as Collins Bartholomew, a map publishing subsidiary of HarperCollins.

In 1995, the office in Duncan Street was closed; however, the building remains there to this day and still bears the Edinburgh Geographical Institute name.

== See also ==
- John George Bartholomew
- Collins Bartholomew
- Royal Scottish Geographical Society
