= Ian Bartholomew (disambiguation) =

Ian Bartholomew (born 1954) is an English actor.

Ian Bartholomew may also refer to:

- Ian Bartholomew (cartographer) (1890–1962), Scottish cartographer
- Ian Bartholomew (cricketer) (born 1983), English cricketer and flood insurer
