= John Christopher Bartholomew =

Scottish-Belgian cartographer and geographer (1923 – 2008)

John Christopher Bartholomew FRSE FRGS FRSGS
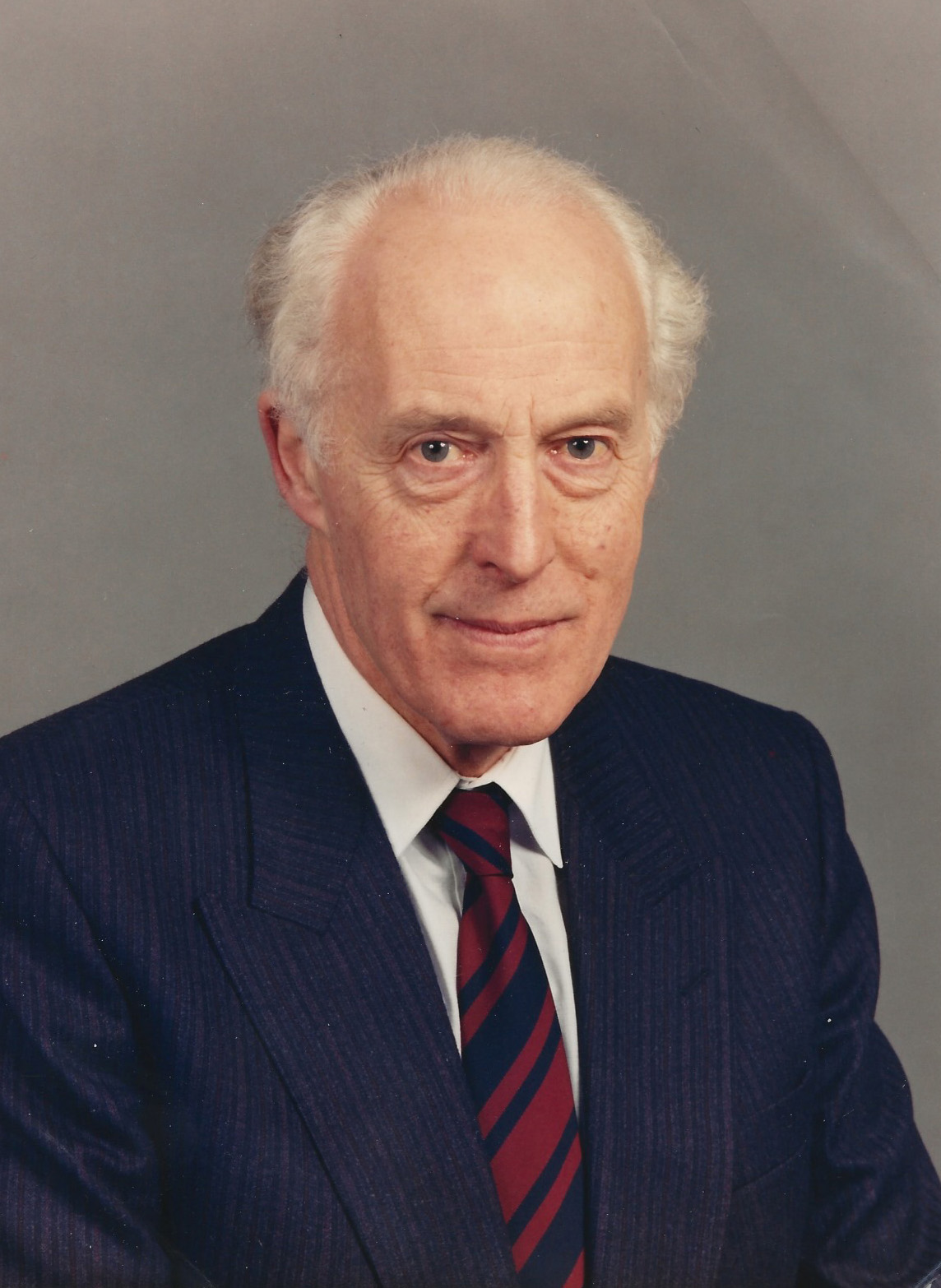
- Born: 15 January 1923; Edinburgh, Scotland, UK
- Died: 16 January 2008 (aged 85); Edinburgh, Scotland, UK
- Education: University of Edinburgh
- Occupations: Cartographer; geographer
- Spouse: Ginette Bartholomew
- Children: 5
- Father: Ian Bartholomew
- Relatives: John George Bartholomew (grandfather); Charles Saroléa (great-uncle); John Bartholomew Jr. (great-grandfather); John Bartholomew Sr. (great-great-grandfather)

John Christopher Bartholomew (or J.C. Bartholomew) (15 January 1923 – 16 January 2008) was a Scottish-Belgian cartographer and geographer.

== Life ==
Bartholomew was born on 15 January 1923 in Edinburgh to Ian Bartholomew, a Scottish cartographer and geographer, and Marie Antoinette Bartholomew (née Sarolea), a Belgian. A member of the Bartholomew family of geographers and map publishers, Bartholomew was the paternal grandson of John George Bartholomew, a cartographer and geographer, the great-grandson of the cartographer John Bartholomew Jr and the great-great-grandson of John Bartholomew Sr, a cartographer, engraver and founder of John Bartholomew and Son. Through his mother, Bartholomew was the great-nephew of the philologist and author Charles Saroléa.

Educated at Edinburgh Academy and Gordonstoun, Bartholomew later studied geography at the University of Edinburgh.

== Career ==
He took over cartographic directorship of the family business from his father in 1951. Later, two of his brothers joined the company: Peter Bartholomew (1924-1987) as chairman and Robert Bartholomew (1927-2017) as production director. The company's most memorable production during their control was the Times Atlas (initially in five volumes but then more widely available in a single 'Comprehensive' and in a 'Concise' version).

Bartholomew served as president of the British Cartographic Society in 1970–71. He was also a vice-president of the International Cartographic Association, 1972–80, and from 1987 to 1993, he was president of the Royal Scottish Geographical Society. He was active on the committee of the Scottish Rights of Way Society (now ScotWays), and was appointed its honorary president.

His lasting legacies include view indicators on the summits of both North Berwick Law and the Braid Hills.

== Personal life ==
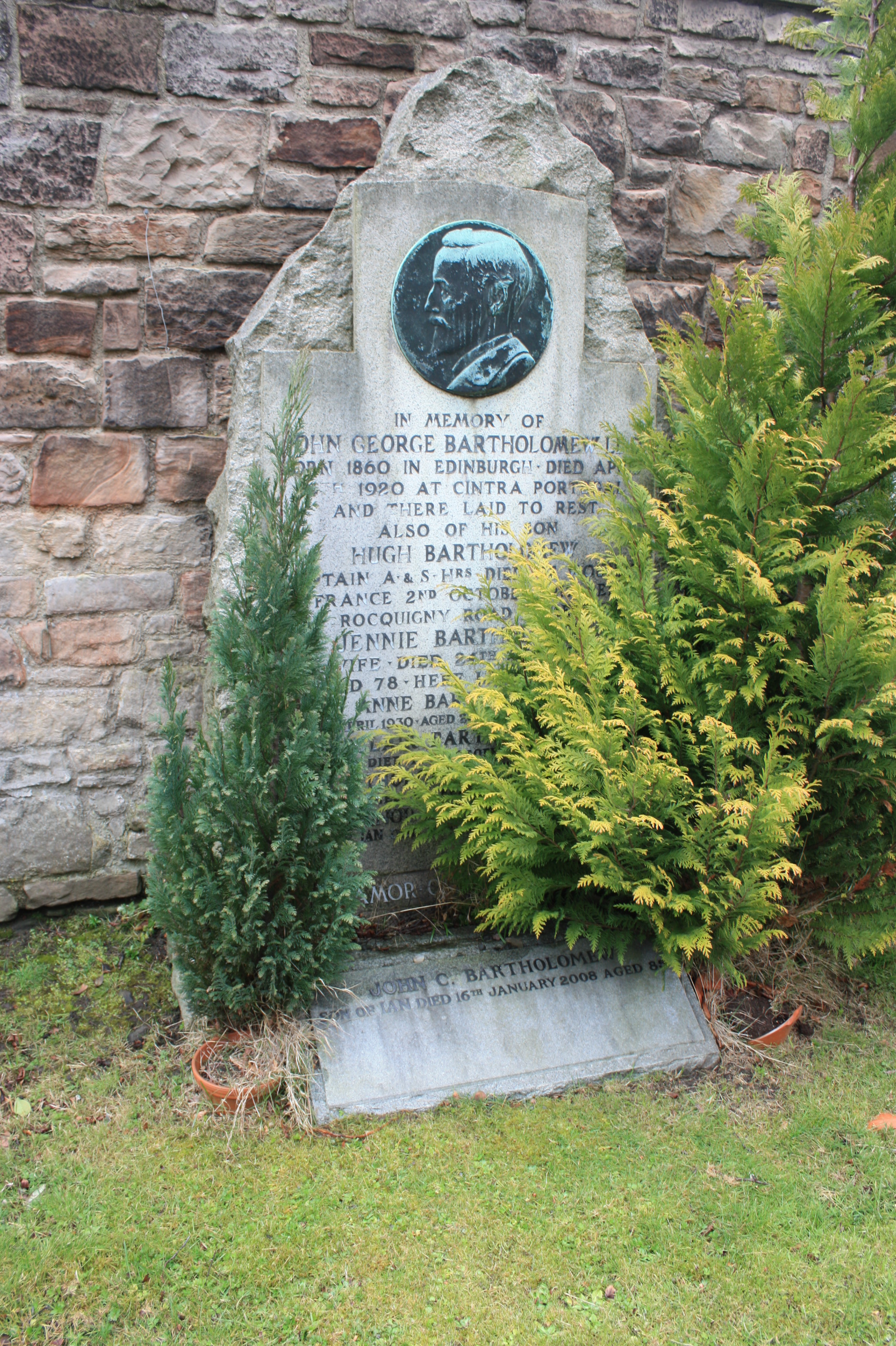
Bartholomew monument, Dean Cemetery

Bartholomew was married to Ginette Bartholomew (née Achard-James), with whom he had five children.

On 16 January 2008, Bartholomew died in Edinburgh aged 85.

He is buried against the north wall of the 20th-century extension to Dean Cemetery in western Edinburgh at the memorial to his grandfather, John George Bartholomew. His father Ian, and uncle Hugh lie with him, as does his wife Ginette.

== See also ==
- John Bartholomew and Son Ltd.
