= Falcon Hall =

- Falcon Hall, Edinburgh
- Interactive map of the Falcon Hall area
- Former names: Morningside Lodge

General information
- Location: Morningside, Edinburgh
- Coordinates: 55°55′47″N 3°12′30″W
- Demolished: 1909

Design and construction
- Architect: Thomas Hamilton

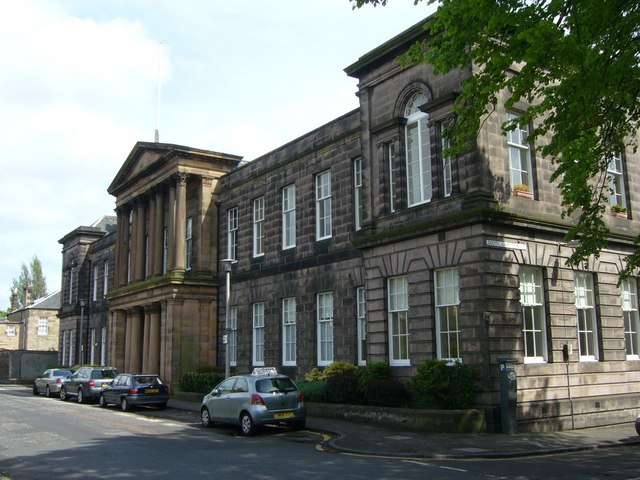
The former Bartholomew & Son premises on Duncan Street, incorporating part of Falcon Hall

Falcon Hall was a large mansion home in Morningside, Edinburgh. It was built in 1780 by William Coulter, a wealthy hosier and baillie who served as Lord Provost of Edinburgh from 1808 until his death in 1810.

Falcon Hall was set on 18 acres (7.3 ha) between Newbattle Terrace and Canaan Lane. The property was acquired in the early 19th century by Alexander Falconar (d.1847), a merchant of the East India Company. Falconar added a neoclassical facade by the architect Thomas Hamilton, and renamed the house based on his name.

Dr John George Bartholomew, a co-founder of the Royal Scottish Geographical Society and owner of the mapmaking company, John Bartholomew & Son Limited was a tenant of the house before 1908.

The entrance to the property stood opposite to the old school. The pillars of the gateway were each surmounted by a falcon, one each side of the gates, painted in brown and gold. The gates were removed in 1874 and reassembled to form the entrance of Edinburgh Zoo in Corstorphine.

The house was demolished in 1909, though the name Falcon was given to the streets later developed on the property. In 1911, when the firm John Bartholomew & Son Limited moved to new premises in Duncan Street, Edinburgh, the central portion of the Falcon Hall facade was re-erected on this new site as the Edinburgh Geographical Institute, where it remains today.
