= Thomas Day =

Thomas Day may refer to:

== Sports ==
- Tom Day (rugby union) (1907–1980), Welsh rugby union player
- Tom Day (American football) (1935–2000), American football player
- Tom Day (footballer) (born 1997), English footballer

== Others ==
- Thomas Day (writer) (1748–1789), British author and abolitionist
- Thomas Day (musician), 17th-century English choirmaster
- Thomas Day (pirate) (fl. 1697), English pirate and privateer active off New England
- Thomas Day (Connecticut judge) (1777–1855), American lawyer, judge, and legal scholar
- Thomas Day (cabinetmaker) (1801–1861), African-American furniture designer and cabinetmaker
- Thomas B. Day (1932–2021), American college president and physicist
- Thomas Fleming Day (1861–1927), British-born American sailboat designer/racer and magazine editor
- Thomas Cuthbert Day (1852–1935), British chemist, photo-engraver and geologist

== See also ==
- Tom Dey (born 1965), American filmmaker
- Day (surname)
