= Joseph Hislop =

Scottish lyric tenor (1884–1977)

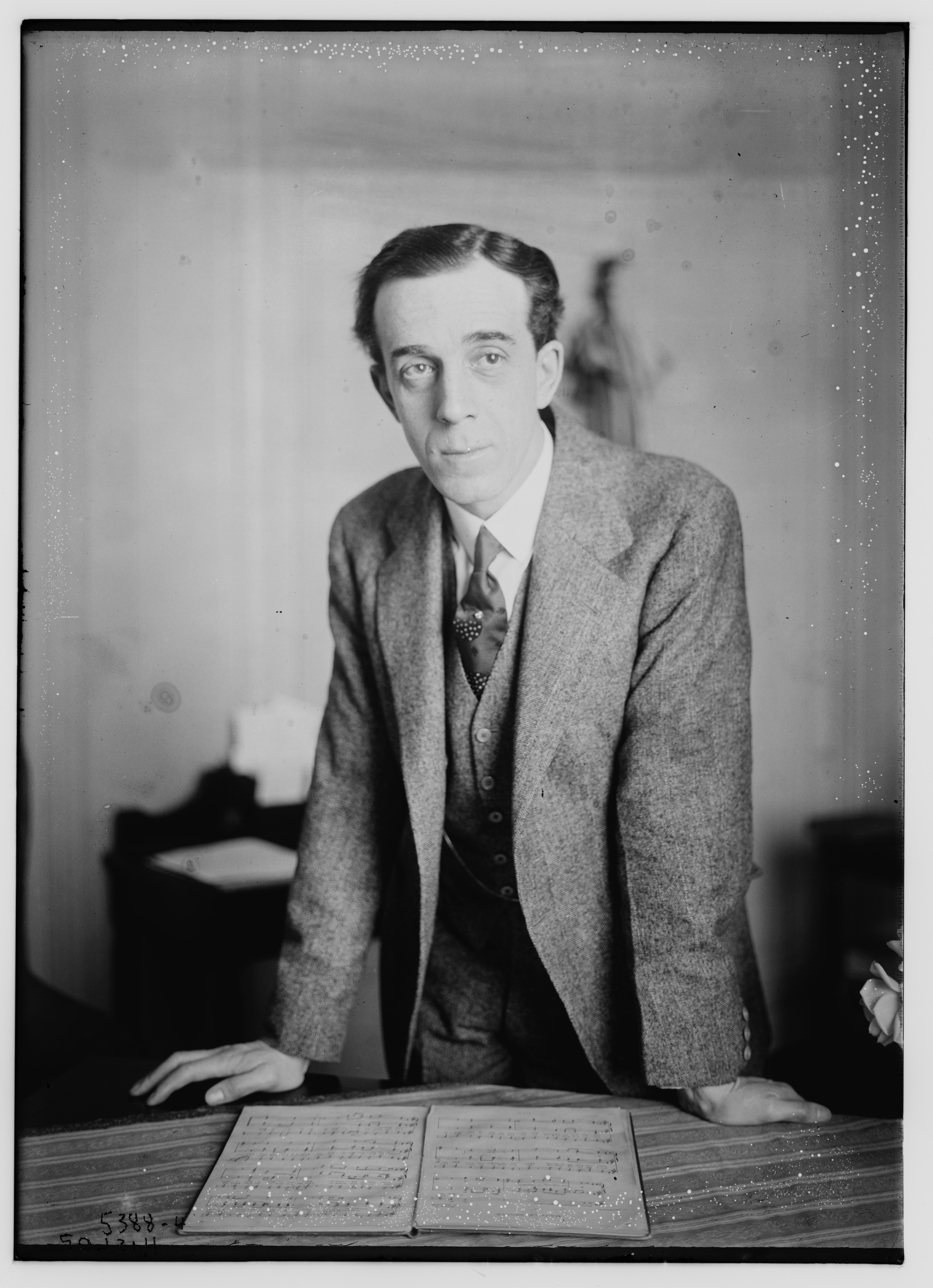
- Joseph Hislop, 1900

Background information
- Birth name: Joseph Dewar Hislop
- Born: 5 April 1884; Edinburgh, Scotland
- Died: 6 May 1977 (aged 93); Fife, Scotland
- Genres: Opera
- Occupation(s): Operatic and concert tenor

Joseph Hislop (5 April 1884 – 6 May 1977) was a Scottish lyric tenor who appeared in opera and oratorio and gave concerts around the world. He sang at La Scala, Milan, the Royal Opera House, Covent Garden, London, and the Opéra-Comique, Paris, as well as forging a remarkable career in Denmark and Sweden, where he was made a Knight of the Dannebrog and a Knight of the Order of Vasa. He toured America, South Africa, Australia and New Zealand on several occasions and made a large number of recordings, some of which are available on CD re-issues. Hislop is notable for having been the final teacher of the Swedish tenor Jussi Björling and for developing a number of fine British singers through his post-War work at the Guildhall School of Music and at Sadler's Wells. After retiring to Fife, he taught the Scottish baritone Donald Maxwell.

== Career ==
Joseph Hislop was born in the city of Edinburgh, at 16 Beaumont (sc. Bowmont) Place, in 1884. He was a pupil and chorister at St Mary's Episcopal Cathedral School, Palmerston Place, Edinburgh, under Dr Thomas Collinson and at the School of Arts (now Heriot-Watt University) where he studied photoprocess engraving. His early employment was in photo-press engraving at Hislop and Day (Edinburgh), then in Glasgow. Subsequently he studied at Bolt Court in London, learning the new three-colour process. Hislop was aware of his vocal ability, but his chances of making a progression into the professional ranks of classical music were dismissed by Dr Collinson. He was sent from Bolt Court to Gothenburg to introduce the latest photoprocess methods to a firm in that Swedish city.

While living in Sweden, he joined a Stockholm male voice choir; but his exceptional voice stood out from the others and he was persuaded to abandon his initial career and train in Stockholm for the operatic stage. He was taught by Dr Gillis Bratt, a medical throat specialist who also sang. Then, uniquely for a non-Swede, he was accepted as a student at the Opera School in Stockholm. He made very rapid progress, and appeared in a performance of Gounod's Faust at the Royal Swedish Opera in 1914. He then went to Milan to further his training, and within a fairly short time he was singing leads in such major Italian opera houses as La Scala, La Fenice, Venice, Teatro di San Carlo, Naples and Teatro Regio, Turin.

Hislop made his London debut at Covent Garden, as Rodolfo in La bohème, in 1920. He was a great success, and he went on to receive acclaim for his performances in Rigoletto, La traviata. He continued singing at Covent Garden until 1928. In 1924, he appeared opposite Dame Nellie Melba. In 1926 he sang Faust opposite Feodor Chaliapin as Mephistopheles. This was a particularly memorable performance, and was immortalised in extensive highlights (13 sides) by one of the early 'live' recording endeavours of His Master's Voice. In the 1926 season he sang Handel's Messiah and was greatly admired in it.

He established a successful career in America, and first appeared (again in Faust) in Chicago in 1920. He toured in North and South America: he was warmly received in Buenos Aires in Argentina. In addition to his Verdi and Puccini roles, he was also a distinguished Roméo and Des Grieux in Manon. He made extended tours in Australia and New Zealand (where his associate artist, with whom he literally came to blows, was the pianist Isador Goodman) and South Africa. Offers from abroad combined with lack of opportunity at home meant that he seems to have made only a handful of main stage performances in his native country.

In Stockholm he received Royal honours, including the Literis et Artibus (1922) and the Order of Vasa in 1929. In Denmark he received the Order of the Dannebrog in 1926. He was appointed Professor of Singing at the Royal Swedish Academy of Music, Stockholm, remaining there until 1948. His students in Sweden included Birgit Nilsson and Per Grundén in Stockholm and Jussi Björling in Gothenburg. He also taught in London at the Guildhall and also supervised singers at Sadler's Wells.

== Marriages ==
Hislop was married twice, first to Karin Asklund and then to Nancie Passmore (daughter of Agnes Fraser and Walter Passmore).

== Death ==
He died at his home, Lundin Links, in Fife, and was cremated at Kirkcaldy. He had lived in Fife for a number of years with his second wife, who survived him.
