= John Mathieson (surveyor) =

Scottish cartographer

John Mathieson FRSE FRSGS (1855, Durness, Sutherland – 14 June 1945, Edinburgh) was a Scottish surveyor, cartographer, explorer and Gaelic scholar.

In 1909, Mathieson retired from his post as Division Superintendent of HM Ordnance Survey in order to serve as chief surveyor on the Scottish scientific expedition to Svalbard, led by William Speirs Bruce.

In 1920-21 he led the surveying party on Prins Karls Forland, largely completing Bruce's survey.

On 7 March 1921 he was elected a Fellow of the Royal Society of Edinburgh, upon the nomination of John Horne, John Flett, Thomas Jehu, Ben Peach, Robert Campbell and Thomas Cuthbert Day.

In 1927 he was awarded the Gold Medal of the Royal Scottish Geographical Society and the Murchison Grant by the Royal Geographical Society.

== Works ==
- Mathieson, John; Bailey, E.B. (1923). "The glacial strand-lines of Loch Tulla". Transactions of the Edinburgh Geological Society. 11 (2): 193–199. doi:10.1144/transed.11.2.193. S2CID 129998978.
- "General Wade and His Military Roads in the Highlands of Scotland", Scottish Geographical Magazine, Volume 40, 1924
- Mathieson, John (1925). "Earth-House or Galleried Building near Durness, Sutherland". Proceedings of the Society of Antiquaries of Scotland. 59: 221–223. doi:10.9750/PSAS.059.221.223. S2CID 257291523.
- Mathieson, John (1926). "Geodesy: A brief historical sketch". Scottish Geographical Magazine. 42 (6): 328–347. doi:10.1080/14702542608553709.
- "St Kilda", Scottish Geographical Magazine, Volume 44, December 1928
- Mathieson, John (1928). "The Antiquities of the St Kilda Group of Islands". Proceedings of the Society of Antiquaries of Scotland. 62: 123–132. doi:10.9750/PSAS.062.123.132.
- "The Story of Antarctic Exploration 1716-1931", 1932
- "The Story of Arctic Voyages and Explorations", 1934
- "The Tragedy of the Scottish Highlands", Scottish Geographical Magazine, Volume 54, 1938
- Mathieson, John (1938). "Work of the new committee on the place-names of Scotland". Scottish Geographical Magazine. 54 (3): 148–150. doi:10.1080/14702543808555324.
- "Scottish Ghost-names and other place names: Some of the Difficulties in ascertaining their Meaning", Scottish Geographical Magazine, Volume 60, 1944
- Inglis, Harry R.G.; Mathieson, John; Watson, C.B.Boog (1934). The early maps of Scotland, with an account of the Ordnance Survey. Edinburgh: Royal Scottish Geographical Society.
