= Times Atlas of the World =

World atlas

First (1895) edition

The Times Atlas of the World, rebranded The Times Atlas of the World: Comprehensive Edition in its 11th edition and The Times Comprehensive Atlas of the World from its 12th edition, is a world atlas currently published by HarperCollins Publisher L.L.C. Its most recent edition, the sixteenth, was published on October 12, 2023.

== Editions ==
=== First generation ===
The first version of The Times Atlas of the World appeared as The Times Atlas in 1895; more printings followed up to 1900. It was published at the office of The Times newspaper in London, and contained 117 pages of maps with an alphabetical index of 130,000 names. The atlas was a reprint of Cassell & Co.'s Universal Atlas, published in 1893. Cassell's atlas, in turn, used maps in English printed in Leipzig which were drawn from the second edition (1887; with some maps of the third edition (1893)) of the German Andrees Allgemeiner Handatlas from the publisher Velhagen & Klasing.

=== Second generation ===
The second generation of the atlas was issued in 1922 as The Times Survey Atlas of the World and was prepared at the Edinburgh Geographical Institute under the direction of John George Bartholomew. It contained 112 double page maps with 200,000 names, and measured 47 cm × 33 cm.

=== Third generation ===
The third generation, based on the second, was Bartholomew's famous five-volume set of 19"×12" elephant folio atlases with 120 plates in eight colors, most maps being double page, and over 200,000 names. The set was issued from 1955–59 as The Times Atlas of the World. Mid-Century Edition by The Times Publishing Company Ltd. in London, (Volume One: The World, Australasia & East Asia. Volume Two: South-West Asia & Russia. Volume Three: Northern Europe. Volume Four: Southern Europe & Africa. Volume Five: The Americas; however, volumes III-V were in fact published first.) A July, 1957 advertisement for The Americas volume suggested that the maps included the latest places of note: "the St. Lawrence Seaway, the newest Federal and Interstate highway systems, ... rocket-launching sites and Atomic Energy installations."

In 1967, an edition in one volume (in which the maps were printed back-to-back – some on a fractionally smaller scale) was published as The Times Atlas of the World. Comprehensive Edition (with 123 leaves of maps in the 9th edition of 1992). This edition also appeared in a German, a Dutch and a French translation. Its introduction reads: "The successor to [the Mid-Century Edition] in one volume, nevertheless, this work contains greater detail, as well as considerable additional material, with no loss of scale, this being achieved by printing on both sides of the paper, using narrower margins, and including a single index. Some revisions and improvements were made; endpaper keys show which parts of the world are covered by which plates; an international glossary gives the English equivalents of common name-words. Some discoveries by satellite surveys were included."

=== Fourth generation ===
The 10th or "Millennium" edition (1999) of the 1967 Comprehensive Edition is in effect the first representative of the fourth generation. In contrast to its predecessors, it is completely produced by means of computer-cartography: The Times Comprehensive Atlas of the World, published by Times Books in London (124 leaves of maps). Contents are slightly different in scale, or in arrangement.

==== 10th edition (1999) ====
According to the publisher, this "was the first entirely new edition of the atlas since the Mid-Century Edition and also the first to be produced from digital data."

==== 11th edition (2003) ====
This edition was also offered, bound in half-leather, by the Folio Society.

==== 12th edition (2007) ====
Changes to previous editions include "an estimated 20,000 mapping updates including 3,500 changes to names, a brand new map of Alaska and NW Canada, abandoned settlements featured for the first time, new satellite images of the continents, revision of all national and socio-economic statistics and new coverage on Biodiversity and the Environment ... The division of Serbia and Montenegro into separate countries. The new national capital of Myanmar called Nay Pyi Taw, a joint capital with Yangon (Rangoon). Secession of St-Barthelemy and St-Martin from Guadeloupe. New World Heritage Sites. Opening of the 1118 km Golmud to Lhasa railway in China, the highest railway in the world. Opening of the 32.5 km cross sea Donghai bridge, in China, linking Shanghai to the deepwater port on Xiaoyang Shan island."

A Luxury Edition was also offered from 2008, bound by Book Works Studio in London.

==== 13th edition (2011) ====
The map of Greenland depicted 15% less ice cover than in the 1999 edition. A number of glaciologists and climate scientists contested the claim. Researchers from the Scott Polar Research Institute wrote: "A sizable portion of the area mapped as ice-free in the Atlas is clearly still ice-covered. There is to our knowledge no support for this claim in the published scientific literature. It's a really bad mapping error." The publishers accepted that "the map did not meet the usual high standards of accuracy and reliability that The Times Atlas of the World strives to uphold" and designed a new map that is now included as an insert in the atlas; it is also available for free download.

==== 14th edition (2014) ====
Changes to the new edition include "5000 place name changes, most notably in Japan, Brazil, South Korea, Taiwan and Spain. Updated national parks and conserved areas including the Kavango Zambezi Transfrontier Conservation Area (KAZA TFCA), the largest conservation zone in the world. Addition of over 50 major waterfalls around the world." [sic] Geopolitical changes include "Realignment of a section of the international boundary between Burkina Faso and Niger resulting from the International Court of Justice decision. New administrative structures in Burkina Faso, Côte d'Ivoire, Kenya and Madagascar, and the addition of the long proposed new Indian state of Telangana. Updated population of Brazilian towns from new census information. Disputed boundary around Crimea."

New features include "New maps of the sub-ice features in the Antarctic and Arctic Ocean. Physical maps of all the continents showing land features which offer a useful counterpoint to political mapping. Illustrated articles on Biodiversity and Climate Change. The Power of Maps – this new section illustrates the influence maps have had on all our lives."

==== 16th edition (2023) ====
New features include:
• New country names for Eswatini (formerly Swaziland) and North Macedonia (previously the Former Yugoslav Republic of Macedonia)
• More than 8000 place name changes with names comprehensively updated in Kazakhstan and Ukraine
• Addition of Māori names in New Zealand and restored indigenous names in Australia, the most notable being the renaming of Fraser Island in Queensland to its Butchulla name K'gari
• Administrative boundary updates in Ethiopia, Mali, and Kazakhstan
• Added road, railway and airport infrastructure across the globe including the 4km-long Dardanelles Bridge (Turkey), the Fehmarn Belt road/rail tunnel alignment (Germany/Denmark) and the Sandoy Tunnel (Faroe Islands)
