= Scottish Geographical Medal =

Highest accolade of the Royal Scottish Geographical Society

The Scottish Geographical Medal is the highest accolade awarded by the Royal Scottish Geographical Society. It is presented for conspicuous merit and performance of world-wide repute. First awarded in 1890 as the Gold Medal, it has been known as the Scottish Geographical Medal since 1933.

== Recipients of the Scottish Geographical Medal (1933 – ) ==
Source: RSGS

- 2022 Iain Stewart
- 2021 Roger Crofts
- 2016 Dr Rita Gardner CBE
- 2015 Dr Frederik Paulsen
- 2012 Sir David Hempleman-Adams LVO OBE
- 2011 Sir David Attenborough OM CH CVO CBE FRS
- 2008 Professor Nigel Thrift
- 2006 Dr Vanessa Lawrence CB
- 2004 Professor David Lowenthal
- 2003 Professor Robert A Dodgshon
- 2002 Professor Sir Ron Cooke DSc
- 2001 The American Geographical Society
- 2000 Professor Kenneth J. Gregory
- 1999 Professor Colin Clarke
- 1998 Professor J Terence Coppock CBE
- 1997 Professor Eckart Ehlers
- 1996 Gilbert M Grosvenor
- 1995 Professor Herman Th Verstappen
- 1994 Dr Denis St-Onge
- 1993 Professor Peter Haggett
- 1992 The Sierra Club, USA
- 1989 The Rt Hon The Lord Shackleton of Burley
- 1988 Professor Stig Jaatinen
- 1984 Professor J Wreford Watson
- 1972 George E R Deacon CBE FRS DSc
- 1969 Professor James Alfred Steers
- 1964 Professor Laurence Dudley Stamp CBE DSc LLD
- 1958 Sir Vivian Ernest Fuchs PhD
- 1954 Dr John Bartholomew MC JP FRSGS
- 1945 Professor Herbert John Fleure DSc
- 1944 James M Wordie
- 1933 The Baron Meston of Agra and Dunottar KCSI LLD

== Recipients of the Gold Medal (1890 – 1927) ==
Source: RSGS

- 1927 John Mathieson FRSE FRSGS
- 1924 Dr Hugh Robert Mill DSc
- 1923 Professor John W Gregory FRS
- 1919 Rt Hon Field-Marshal Earl Haig of Bemersyde KT KCB
- 1915 Dr J Scott Keltie Kt LLD
- 1913 Professor Albrecht Penck
- 1912 Captain Roald Amundsen
- 1911 James Young Buchanan FRS
- 1910 Professor James Geikie DCL LLD FRS
- 1908 Dr Sven Anders Hedin
- 1906 HSH Albert, First Prince of Monaco
- 1905 Colonel Sir Francis Younghusband KCIE
- 1904 Dr William Speirs Bruce
- 1897 Dr Fridtjof Nansen
- 1890 Henry Morton Stanley MP

== See also ==
- List of geography awards
