= Ian Bartholomew (cartographer) =

Scottish cartographer and geographer

Ian Bartholomew (1890-1962) CBE MC FRSE FRGS
- Born: John Bartholomew; 12 February 1890; Edinburgh, Scotland, UKGBI
- Died: 9 February 1962 (aged 71); Edinburgh, Scotland, UK
- Resting place: Dean Cemetery
- Education: University of Edinburgh
- Occupations: Cartographer; geographer
- Spouse: Marie Antoinette Bartholomew (m. 1920)
- Children: 6, including John Christopher Bartholomew
- Father: John George Bartholomew
- Relatives: John Bartholomew Jr. (grandfather); John Bartholomew Sr. (great-grandfather)
- Awards: Military Cross, 1915; Scottish Geographical Medal, 1954; CBE, 1960; Patron's Medal, 1961

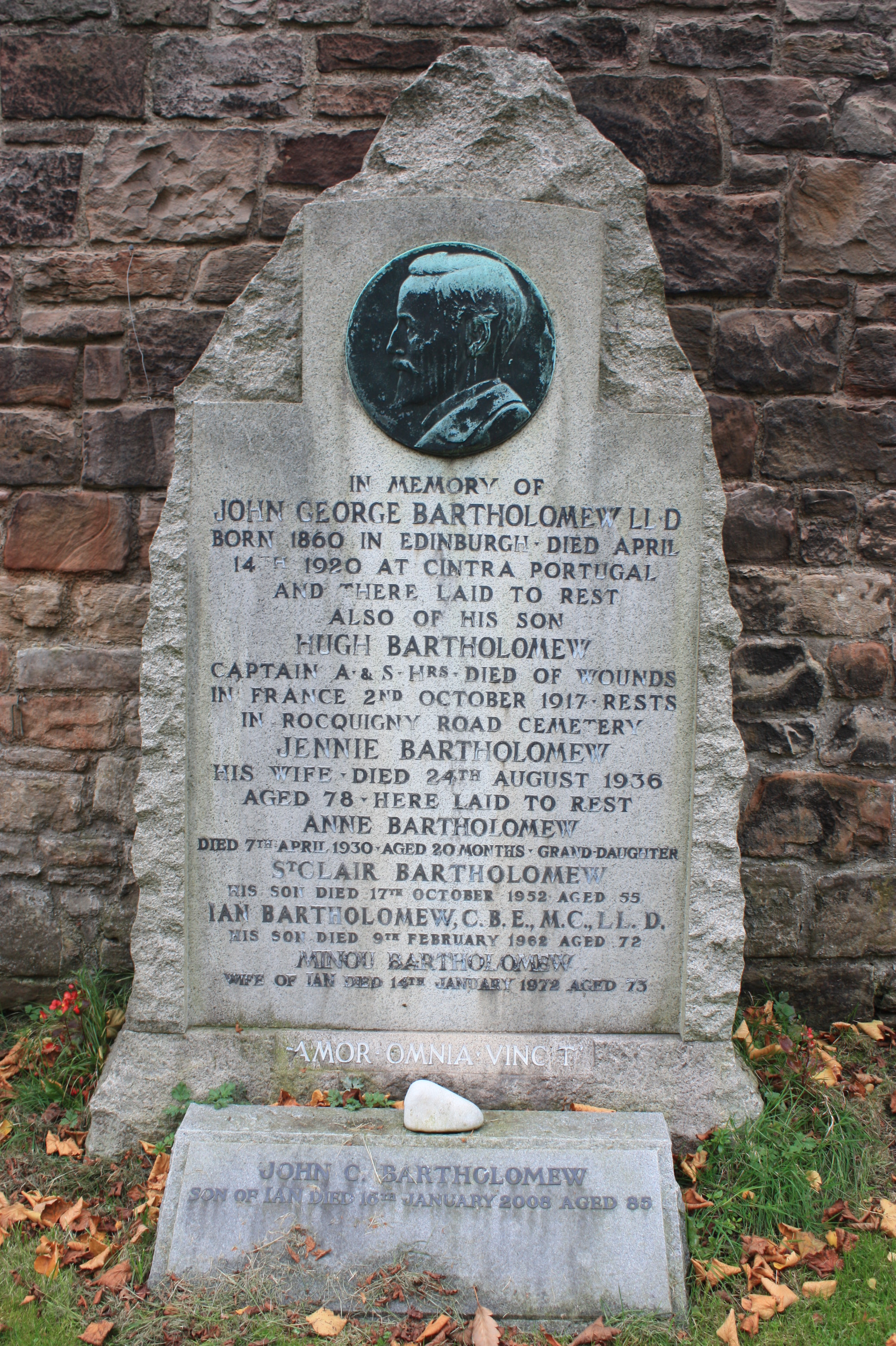
The memorial to the Bartholomews, Dean Cemetery

John Bartholomew, MC CBE FRGS FRSGS (12 February 1890 – 9 February 1962), known as Ian Bartholomew, was a Scottish cartographer and geographer.

== Life ==
Bartholomew was born John Bartholomew on 12 February 1890 in Edinburgh to John George Bartholomew, a cartographer and geographer, and Janet "Jennie" Bartholomew (née Macdonald; 1857–1936). A member of the Bartholomew family of geographers and map publishers, Bartholomew was the paternal grandson of the cartographer John Bartholomew Jr and the great-grandson of John Bartholomew Sr, a cartographer, engraver and founder of John Bartholomew and Son.

He was educated at Merchiston Castle School. Bartholomew studied cartography in Leipzig, Paris and at the University of Edinburgh and took over the family business John Bartholomew and Son Ltd. on the death of his father John George Bartholomew. He inherited the task from his father of completing the Times Survey Atlas of the World (1921), which was expanded into the Times Mid-Century Edition (issued in five volumes between 1955 and 1960). He introduced new cartographic techniques, modern printing and expanded the company significantly.

He was awarded the Military Cross in 1915 after serving with the Gordon Highlanders and General Staff during the 1914—18 War. He was also Mentioned in Dispatches.

He served as Honorary Secretary and President of the Royal Scottish Geographical Society (1920–54) and was awarded their Scottish Geographical Medal in 1954. In 1960 he was appointed C.B.E. and in 1961 awarded the Patron's Medal of the Royal Geographical Society of London.

He died in Edinburgh and is buried at his father's memorial against the north wall of the 20th century extension to Dean Cemetery in western Edinburgh, together with his mother Jennie, brother Hugh, and son, John Christopher Bartholomew.

== Family ==
He married Marie Antionette Bartholomew (née Saroléa), niece of Charles Saroléa in 1920.

He entrusted the management of the company to his three sons, John, Peter and Robert.

== See also ==
- John Bartholomew and Son Ltd.
