= John Bartholomew =

Scottish cartographer (1831–1893)

John Bartholomew FRGS
- Born: 25 December 1831; Edinburgh, Scotland, UKGBI
- Died: 29 March 1893 (aged 61); London, England, UKGBI
- Spouses: Annie Bartholomew (m. 1859; died 1872); Anne Cumming Bartholomew (m. 1874)
- Children: 9, including John George Bartholomew
- Father: John Bartholomew Sr
- Relatives: Ian Bartholomew (grandson); John Christopher Bartholomew (great-grandson)

John Bartholomew Jr (25 December 1831 – 30 March 1893) was a Scottish cartographer.

== Biography ==
Bartholomew was born on 25 December 1831 in Edinburgh to John Bartholomew Sr, a cartographer, engraver and founder of John Bartholomew and Son, and Margaret Bartholomew (née McGregor).

Trained as a geographical draughtsman and engraver, Bartholomew spent two years working under August Petermann at the London offices of Justus Perthes. In 1856, Bartholomew took over the management of his father's company. For this establishment, Bartholomew built up a reputation unsurpassed in Great Britain for the production of the finest cartographical work.

He is best known for the commercial development of colour contouring (or hypsometric tints), the system of representing altitudes on a graduated colour scale, with areas of high altitude in shades of brown and areas of low altitude in shades of green. He first showcased his colour contouring system at the Paris Exhibition of 1878; although it was initially met with skepticism, it went on to become a standard cartographical practice.

Among his numerous publications, particularly worthy of note is the series of maps of Great Britain reduced from the Ordnance Survey to scales of half-inch and quarter-inch to 1 mile, with relief shown by contour lines and hypsometric tints. The half-inch series is among the finest of its kind ever produced. He was commissioned to engrave the map of Treasure Island for Robert Louis Stevenson.

Upon his retirement in 1888, John Bartholomew was succeeded in the firm by his son John George Bartholomew, who extended the half-inch series, and applied its principles to many other works. For the last six years of his life Bartholomew was living at 32 Royal Terrace in Edinburgh.

== Personal life ==
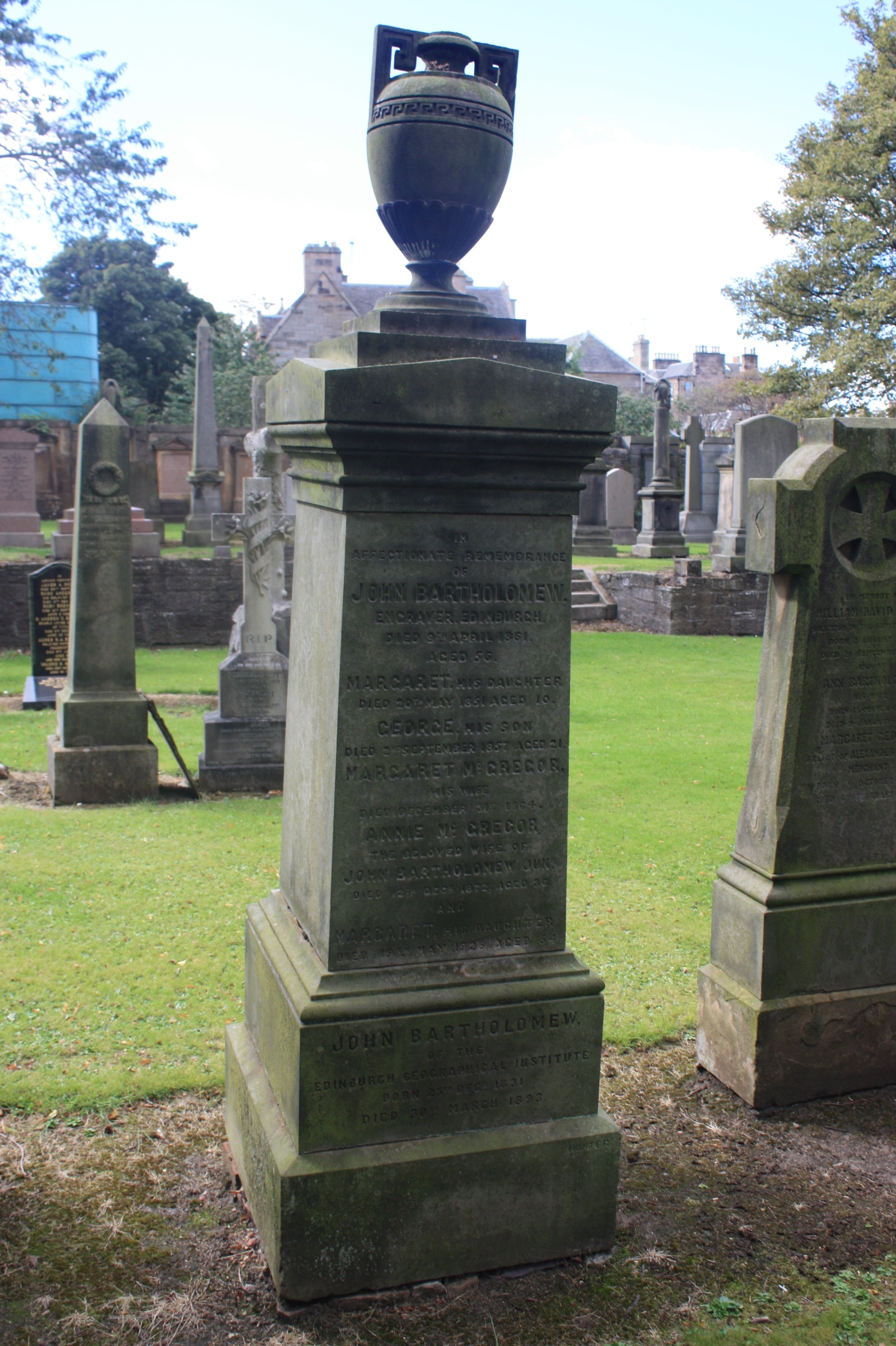
Bartholomew grave, Grange Cemetery, Edinburgh

On 5 July 1859, Bartholomew married Annie Bartholomew (née McGregor; 1836–1872). The couple had five children, including the cartographer and geographer John George Bartholomew. On 4 March 1874, Bartholomew married Anne Cumming Bartholomew (1837–1908; née Nimmo) with whom he had 4 children.

Bartholomew died in London on 30 March 1893. He is buried with his parents in Grange Cemetery in Edinburgh, in the northwest section. His wife Annie McGregor (1836–1872), whom he greatly outlived, is also buried there.
