= Ian Bartholomew (cricketer) =

English cricketer (born 1983)

Personal information
- Full name: Ian David Bartholomew
- Born: 8 February 1983 (age 43); Hemel Hempstead, England
- Batting: Left-handed

Domestic team information
- Years: Team
- 2006: Cambridge University Cricket Club
- Source: Cricinfo, 8 April 2017

Ian David Bartholomew (born 8 February 1983) is an English cricketer, glaciologist and insurer.

== Education ==
He was educated at Berkhamsted School; Christ's College, Cambridge (B.A. Geography 2002–05, M.Phil Polar Studies 2005–06) and the University of Edinburgh (Ph.D. Glaciology 2007–11), his doctoral thesis "Hydrology and dynamics of a land-terminating Greenland outlet glacier" being published in 2012.

== Cricket ==
Bartholomew played one first-class match for Cambridge University Cricket Club: in the University Match of 2006 he scored 18 and 42 opening the batting, being dismissed by Michael Munday in both innings.

== Catastrophe insurance ==
Bartholomew previously worked on catastrophe modelling at Risk Management Solutions (RMS), which developed a parametric insurance model for New York City after Hurricane Sandy. In 2017, Bartholomew co-founded FloodFlash, a London-based flood insurance provider which pays out on a parametric basis (if water levels exceed a pre-agreed threshold according to an installed sensor) rather than on an assessment of damages.

== See also ==
- List of Cambridge University Cricket Club players
