= Charles Saroléa =

Belgian philologist and author (1870–1953)

Charles Louis-Camille Saroléa (24 October 1870 in Tongeren – 11 March 1953 in Edinburgh) was a Belgian philologist and author.

== Life ==
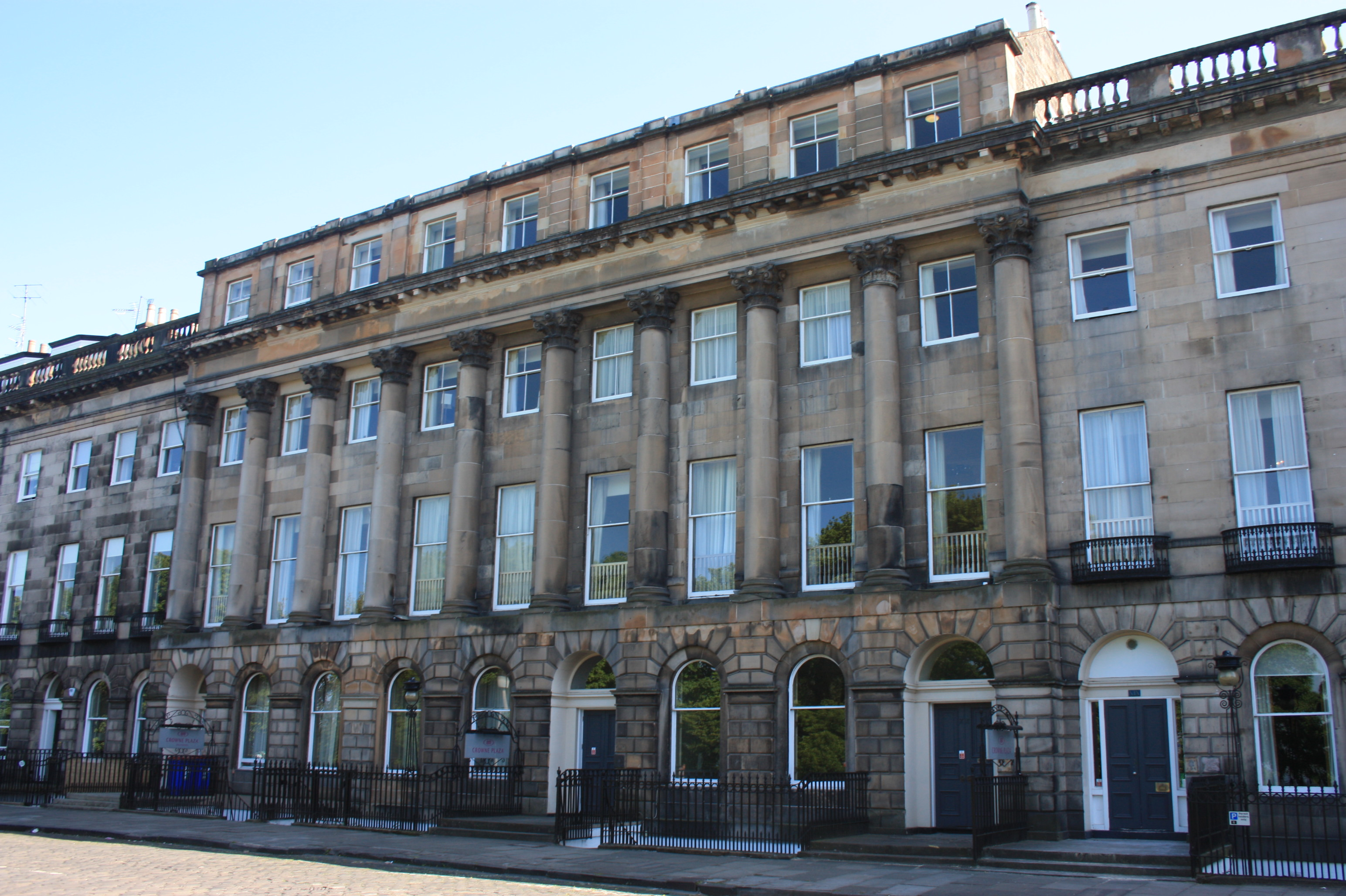
21 Royal Terrace, Edinburgh

Saroléa was born in Tongeren on 24 October 1870 the son of Dr Jean Pierre Saroléa MD. He was educated at Lycee Athenee at Hasselt. He then studied at the University of Liège.

He moved to Edinburgh in 1894 as Head of French at the University of Edinburgh (as Dr Sarolea). He initially lived in a flat at 74 Bruntsfield Place.

In 1903 he was elected a Fellow of the Royal Society of Edinburgh. His proposers were George Chrystal, Alexander Crum Brown, Sir Francis Grant Ogilvie and James Gordon MacGregor. He was also a member of the Scottish Arts Club.

In 1910, he moved to 21 Royal Terrace on Calton Hill. He was an avid book collector, and his library grew to such proportions that he took an adjoining property on the terrace to accommodate it.

Saroléa wrote on Russia and from 1909 to 1912 directed the "Collection Nelson" for Thomas Nelson and Sons — a library of classic and modern French literature (in French) sold in France, the UK and beyond. He was lured away from Nelson by Joseph Mallaby Dent for two purposes. The first was to edit Dent's Everyman, a weekly literary magazine favourable to the doctrine of distributism, which he did from 1912 until the First World War forced the suspension of publication in 1916. The second was to create Dent's own French-language series, known as the "Collection Gallia".

In 1915, he was sent by the Belgian government to the United States to support the veracity of atrocity stories in circulation about the German occupation of Belgium. The mission was not a success, in that Saroléa publicly attacked the neutrality that the US was observing at the time with respect to World War I. Recent academic interest has been on his political views.

In 1918, he was given his professorship by the University of Edinburgh which he held until retiral in 1931.

Saroléa died in Edinburgh on 11 March 1953.

== Family ==
Saroléa married twice: firstly in 1895 to Martha van Cauwenberghe, then secondly in 1905 to Julia Dorman.

His niece Marie Antoinette Saroléa married the cartographer John Bartholomew.

== Artistic recognition ==
His portrait by William Leadbetter Calderwood is held by the University of Edinburgh.

== Works ==
- Henrik Ibsen (1891)
- Essais de philosophie et de littérature (1898)
- Les belges au Congo (1899)
- A Short History of the Anti-Congo Campaign (1905)
- The French Revolution and the Russian Revolution (1906)
- Newman's Theology (1908)
- The Anglo-German Problem (1912)
- Count L.N. Tolstoy. His life and work (1912)
- Anthologie des Poètes lyriques français (1914)
- How Belgium Saved Europe (1915)
- The Curse of the Hohenzollern (1915)
- The Murder of Nurse Cavell (1915)
- The French Renascence (1916)
- Europe's Debt to Russia (1916)
- Great Russia Her Achievement and Promise (1916)
- German problems and personalities (1917)
- The Russian revolution and the war (1917)
- The Maid of Orleans: The Story of Joan of Arc Told to American Soldiers (1918)
- Europe and the League of Nations (1919)
- Versailles und der Völkerbund (1920)
- Letters on Polish Affairs (1922)
- Impressions of Soviet Russia (1924)
- Robert Louis Stevenson and France (1924)
- The Policy of Sanctions and the Failure of the League of Nations (1936)
- Daylight on Spain: The Answer to the Duchess of Atholl (1937)
