= John B. Bartholomew =

America journalist (1916–1983)

John Bryson Bartholomew (October 17, 1916 – June 1, 1983) was an American journalist, radio and television broadcaster and combat war correspondent for the American Broadcasting Company in the European Theater during World War II.

== Broadcasting career ==
Bartholomew began his career in radio broadcasting in Joliet, Illinois, in 1939. He subsequently worked part-time for a radio station in Stockton, California, and then, in June 1941, became a sportscaster for KFPY in Spokane, Washington. Six months after marrying his college sweetheart, Dorothy E. Houck, on June 24, 1941, he assumed a position with ABC in Chicago as a member of their news staff. When the United States entered World War II on December 7, 1941, he began announcing the Coca-Cola “Spotlight Bands” program from various military bases around America.

=== Military work ===
In August 1944, Bartholomew enlisted in the army as a war correspondent for the Blue Network (ABC), and shipped out from New York in October 1944 to broadcast on the war from London. After several months covering Parliament meetings and conducting personal interviews, he was assigned on February 10, 1945 to General George S. Patton's Third Army which was in eastern France preparing to move into Germany for the final offensive.

Broadcasting under the name John Bryson, he was the first war correspondent to cross the Rhine River on March 22, 1945 at Oppenheim, Germany. He was with Patton when the Third Army liberated German administered POW camps at Hammelburg, Ziegenhain in Schwalmstadt-Trutzhain and Buchenwald in Weimar. After the war ended in Europe, he spent the next several months in Germany and then in Norway conducting interviews with German citizens and American soldiers before returning home in Wilmette, Illinois.

Bryson is quoted in the book, The Patton Papers, 1940-1945 as saying “It was his greatest privilege to report on the Third Army during the war and to be close to 'the greatest military genius since Lee and Jackson.' He honestly believed that the war would be still in progress if Patton had not been there. Patton was without doubt the 'greatest front line general in the world' and his Army was the best. He had heard somewhere, Bryson added, that there had been other American Armies engaged, but for him that would always be a rumor." On September 15, 1945, three months before he died, General Patton wrote a letter to ABC commending Bryson's service with him. John subsequently wrote a letter to the general thanking him for the compliment, and the general promptly responded in a letter to him saying “It's always a real pleasure to be able to say a good word to a man's boss about a man who has done a good job. Therefore, in mentioning your name, I was pleasing myself and giving honor to where honor was due.”

=== Civilian work ===
Upon his return to the United States in June 1945, Bryson continued working with the ABC network for WENR radio in Chicago where he covered news for the ABC network of stations and hosted John Bryson Sports until deteriorating health required him to move to Colorado Springs, Colorado in June 1955.

He began his career as a news commentator with John Bartholomew Channel 11 Commentary on television station KKTV and radio station KVOR. News commentary was in its infancy, but for a decade he "carved a niche in the minds and hearts of Colorado Springs radio listeners and TV watchers." During his decade with KKTV, he and his wife conducted world tours sponsored by KKTV, journeying to 66 countries. He was also a featured speaker for many local organizations and school graduations.

After President Kennedy's assassination in November 1963, Bartholomew wrote a screenplay for the movie Countdown in Dallas, which afforded him the opportunity of interviewing Marina Oswald. That same year he also began his career in newspaper journalism with his twice weekly column Personally Yours for The Free Press (later Colorado Springs Sun).

After his television show was canceled in 1964, Bartholomew returned full-time to radio as a news journalist and commentator for KVOR. He subsequently became the news director of KRYT radio and several years later, assumed the same position for the new FM station in town, KKFM, where he remained until 1981 when he retired. During his years with KKFM, he wrote the script for Money Savers, a series of syndicated radio programs on financial management. He also wrote and broadcast a series of reports for senior citizens.

At the time of his death on June 1, 1983, he was in the process of writing his autobiography, which included many of his most noteworthy broadcasts from World War II like “Scots at Buchenwald,” “Churchill at Selfridges at Two A.M.,” and “Patton says 'Who Will Take This Hill.'” The book also was to include his interviews with some of the famous people he had the good fortune to meet during his forty-year career in broadcasting and journalism.
