= Hypsometric tints =

Use of color to mark elevation in a map

Hypsometric tinted contour lines

Hypsometric tints (also called layer tinting, elevation tinting, elevation coloring, or hypsometric coloring) are colors placed between contour lines to indicate elevation. These tints are shown as bands of color in a graduated scheme or as a color scheme applied to contour lines themselves; either method is considered a type of Isarithmic map. Hypsometric tinting of maps and globes is often accompanied by a similar method of bathymetric tinting to convey differences in water depth.

== History ==
In his map of central Italy, c.1503, Leonardo da Vinci introduced the cartographic convention of using colored chalk to indicate changes in elevation.

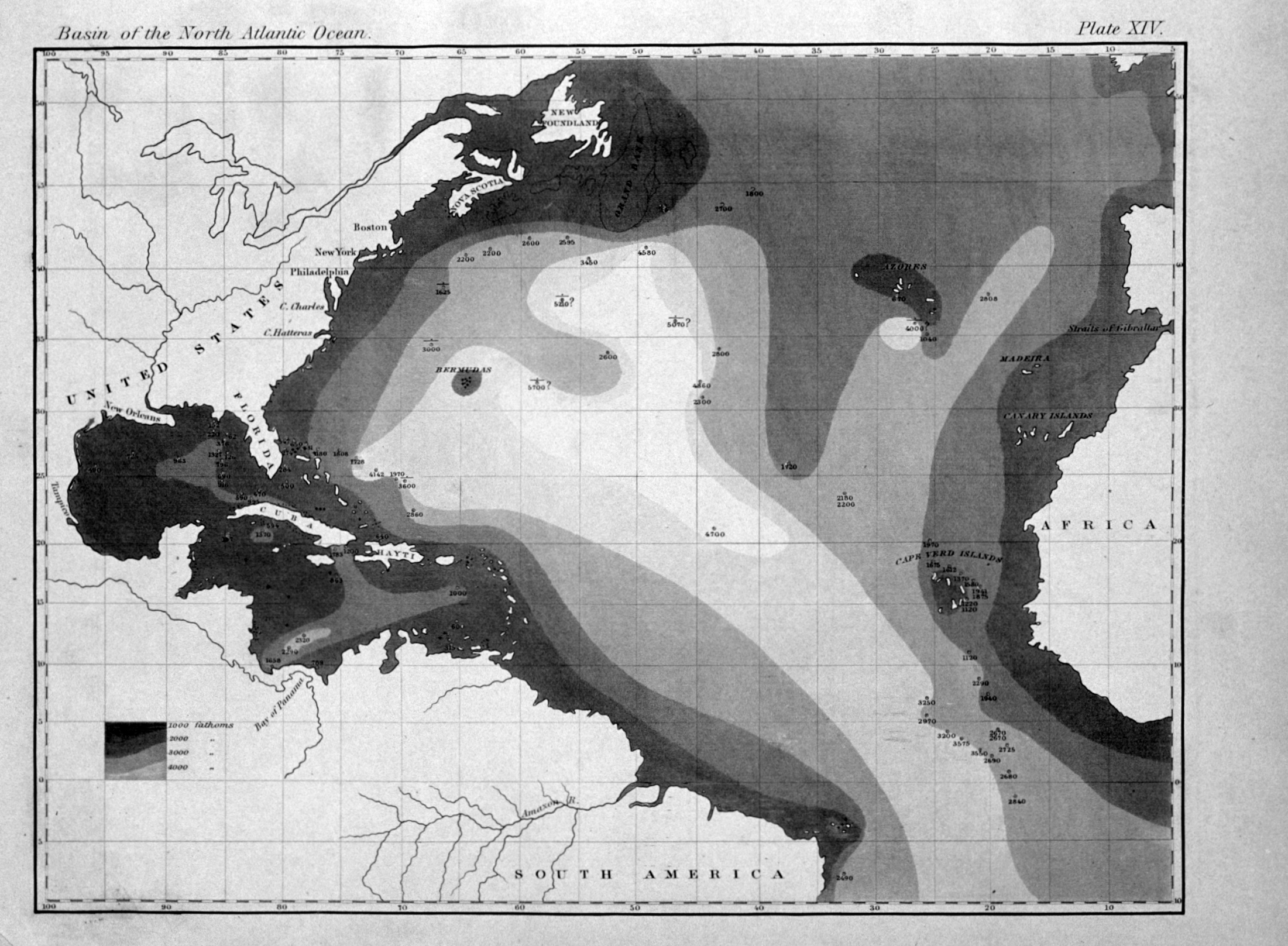
First map of oceanic bathymetry, derived from USS Dolphin (1836) data

In the 18th century, spot heights were first interpolated to create contour lines. In the late 1820s, Franz von Hauslab was credited with the first colored contour maps using lithography. With the invention of chromolithography, copies of colored maps became more accessible. The Scottish map firm John Bartholomew and Son is credited with popularizing the colored contour line technique, and their color scheme has become conventional: dark greens at low elevations, progressing through yellows and others, to browns and then grays and whites at the highest elevations.

At right is "The very earliest rendition of a bathymetric map of an oceanic basin. Matthew Fontaine Maury published this map in 1853 in Explanations and Sailing Directions to Accompany the Wind and Current Charts."

== Application ==
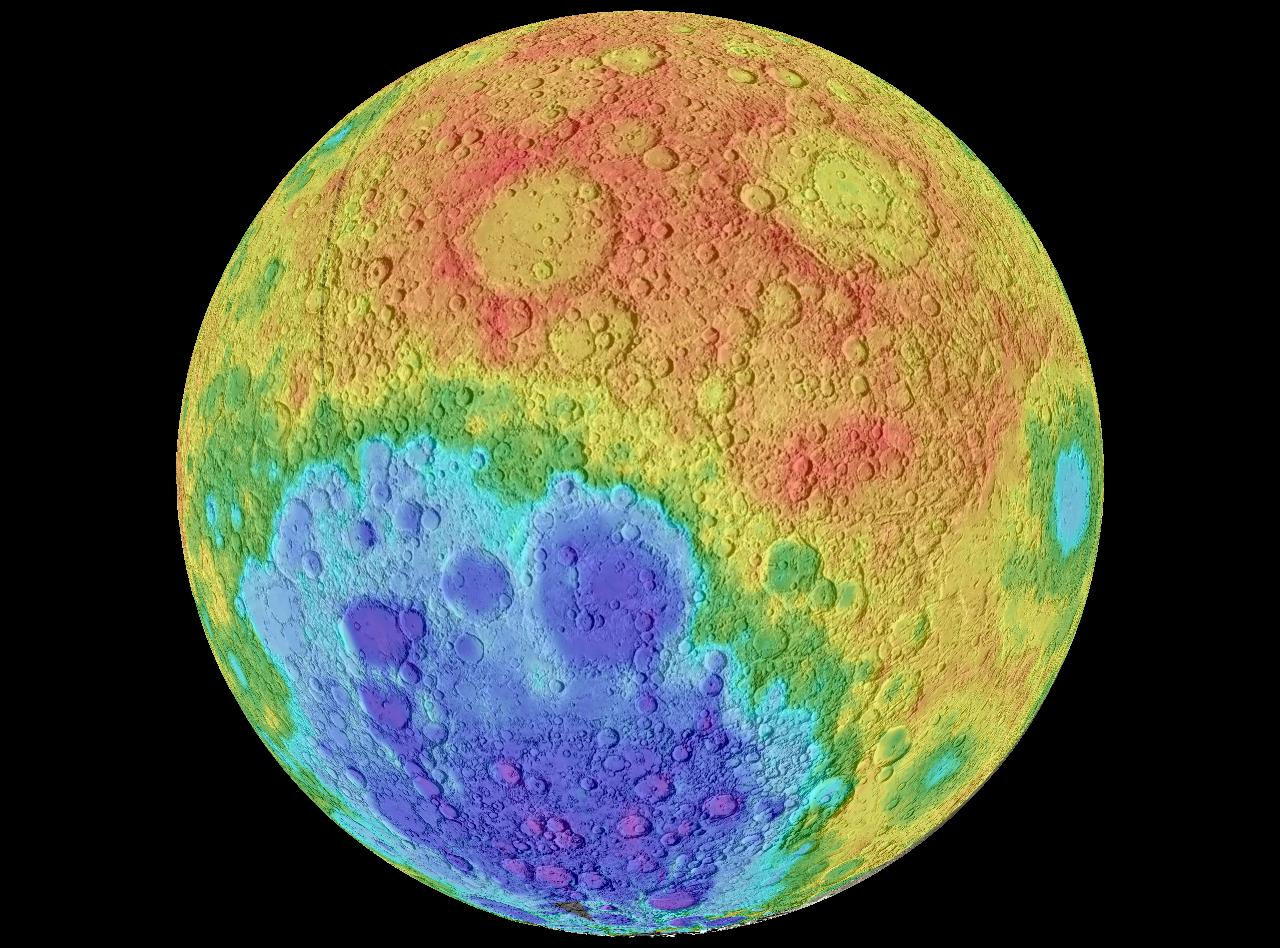
The Moon with hypsometric tints of red for the highest points and purple for the lowest.

There are two primary types of hypsometric tinting: discrete and continuous.

Maps with discrete hypsometric tinting have a distinct, uniform color between each of the contours, which give them a stepped appearance. The historical bathymetric map shown at the right is an example of discrete hypsometric tinting.

In a map with continuous hypsometric tinting, there is a gradual shift from one tint to another, which presents a smoother appearance. This is often accomplished using data from a digital elevation model (DEM). Each pixel in the DEM is assigned a color which corresponds to the exact elevation at that location, so it is more precise than discrete hypsometric tinting. The colorful image of the moon has continuous hypsometric tinting.

A typical color scheme progresses from dark greens for lower elevations, up through yellows/browns and on to grays and white at the highest elevations. In bathymetric tinting, lighter shades of blue represent shallower water such as the continental shelf and darker shades represent deeper regions.

Compare the information available in this image of a slightly different face of the Moon to the WorldWind depiction above.

Similar to false-color imagery, hypsometric tints can be used to make geographic information more accessible, as with this image of lunar topography.

Some cartographers have suggested that hypsometric tints are often used as decoration, rather than for informational purposes:

...the current popularity of hypsometric tints has more to do with production ease and pretty colors than it does with our interest in elevation. ... With hypsometric tints, the result is often a map with pleasing colors that blend softly into one another in an orderly fashion, a design trait that people find attractive, even if they don't necessarily know or care about elevations.
