= Collins Bartholomew =

Scottish map publishing company

Collins Bartholomew, formerly John Bartholomew and Son, is a long-established map publishing company originally based in Edinburgh, Scotland. It is now a subsidiary of HarperCollins.

== History ==
George Bartholomew (8 January 1784 – 23 October 1871, active from 1797) worked as an engraver for Daniel Lizars Sr. in Edinburgh. His son, John Bartholomew Senior (1805–9 April 1861), began working independently in about 1826, founding the firm that bears his name. Notable work included Black's General Atlas of 1846.

John Bartholomew Junior (1831–1893) and his son John George Bartholomew (1860–1920) brought the firm to prominence as the renamed 'Edinburgh Geographical Institute'. In particular, J.G. Bartholomew made the firm a publisher of its own works, rather than a producer of maps for other firms. Ian Bartholomew (1890–1962) oversaw the Times Survey Atlas of the World (1922) and later the Mid-Century Edition of the Times Atlas of the World (1955–60).

The cartographic tradition continued into a fifth family generation. John Christopher Bartholomew (1923–2008) shared his ancestors' fascination with the natural sciences, their meticulous standards and spirit of enterprise, and oversaw the publication of some of the most detailed maps of the last century, including The Times Comprehensive Atlas of the World (1967). His brother Robert, who was trained in printing, soon became the production director, and another brother, Peter, who was trained in accountancy, was first appointed as managing director and later became executive chairman.

In 1989, the firm merged with the Glasgow publisher Collins, as part of the multinational HarperCollins Publishers under Rupert Murdoch's News International corporation. A range of maps and atlases are still being published today under the imprint of HarperCollins, but the name of Bartholomew survives as the trade name of HarperCollins' cartographic databases (Collins Bartholomew) based in Bishopbriggs, Glasgow. The British Isles mapping arm (formerly Geographia Ltd.) was based in Cheltenham until that office was closed in 2009 and remaining staff made redundant in 2010. Collins Geo in Bishopbriggs continues to handle world mapping, British Isles map products, and sales of geographical data.

== Publications ==
Bartholomew was the only survivor of a number of important map publishers in Scotland, and was known for a prolific output and variety of maps and atlases for academic, commercial and travel purposes, including the popular 62-sheet Half-Inch to One Mile map series of Great Britain, which transmuted into the 1:100,000 National map series in the 1970s. It was eventually discontinued owing largely to stiff competition from the state-financed Ordnance Survey.

John Bartholomew Junior was credited with having pioneered the use of hypsometric tints or layer colouring on maps in which low ground is shown in shades of green and higher ground in shades of brown, then eventually purple and finally white. It is his son John George who is attributed with being the first to bring the name 'Antarctica' into popular use as the name for the Southern Continent, and for the adoption of red or pink as the colour for the British Empire.

The firm's first major work as a publisher was The Royal Scottish Geographical Society's Atlas of Scotland (1895), later called the Survey Atlas of Scotland, which was followed by the Survey Atlas of England and Wales (1903).

In 1922, the company was responsible for the production of a major new atlas for The Times newspaper: The Times Survey Atlas of the World. This would later become The Times Comprehensive Atlas, which received a boost when a new Millennium edition was published using digital map production technology for the first time. The atlas continues to be a 'must-have' for libraries, on account of its almost unrivalled size combined with a policy of detailed updating.

Another great Bartholomew reference atlas was the Citizen's Atlas of the World, which ran through ten editions (1898–1952). Other publications include two volumes of the ambitious Physical Atlas: Meteorology (1899) and Zoogeography (1911), based on the landmark Berghaus Physikalischer Atlas.

John Bartholomew & Son Ltd officially ceased to exist when it was de-registered at Companies House in 1995. A new company using the name John Bartholomew & Son Ltd (Companies House SC194433) was registered in Scotland on 18 March 1999. It is based at Hardengreen Business Park just outside Edinburgh, and is owned by former staff.

== Relocation ==
The company was relocated from its offices in Duncan Street, Edinburgh, in 1995 to HarperCollins’ Glasgow offices in Westerhill Road, Bishopbriggs. Many long-serving staff left at that time. The Duncan Street office in Edinburgh had been built in 1911 using the imposing Palladian façade of a former Bartholomew family home, Falcon Hall, and this now forms the frontage for a series of up-market flats created from the former offices. The works behind the offices were demolished and replaced by new blocks of flats, which were named by the builder after prominent Scottish writers who had no connection with Bartholomews or cartography. An unveiling ceremony was attended by the Princess Royal.

The departure of the company from Edinburgh after some 170 years was marked by an initiative of the Royal Scottish Geographical Society and George Russell (not an employee) to arrange for the erection of a commemorative plaque with the cooperation of the last John Bartholomew.

== Archives ==
The Maps Reading Room of the National Library of Scotland (which is located near the former Duncan Street offices) contains the extensive archives of the Bartholomew company, a product of a long and fruitful association between the two organisations. A book, still available from the company at its post-1995 address in Bishopbriggs, Glasgow (Bartholomew - 150 Years), details the history and achievements of Bartholomews’ up to the time of its 150th anniversary in 1976, not very long after the last of the copperplate engravers retired and the company started to pioneer the use of geographic information systems (GIS) and computer-generated mapping for its cartographic publishing and for the selling of map data.

Robert Gordon Bartholomew, of the sixth generation of cartographers, has extensively researched and documented the genealogy not only of his own branch of the family, but also of several other Bartholomew families. His work upholds the belief held by many Bartholomews that all Bartholomews of Scottish origin are related.

John G. Bartholomew built and inhabited "Overton House" in Ealing, London, now home of a lay centre (Benedictine Study and Arts Centre).
