= Thomas Cuthbert Day =

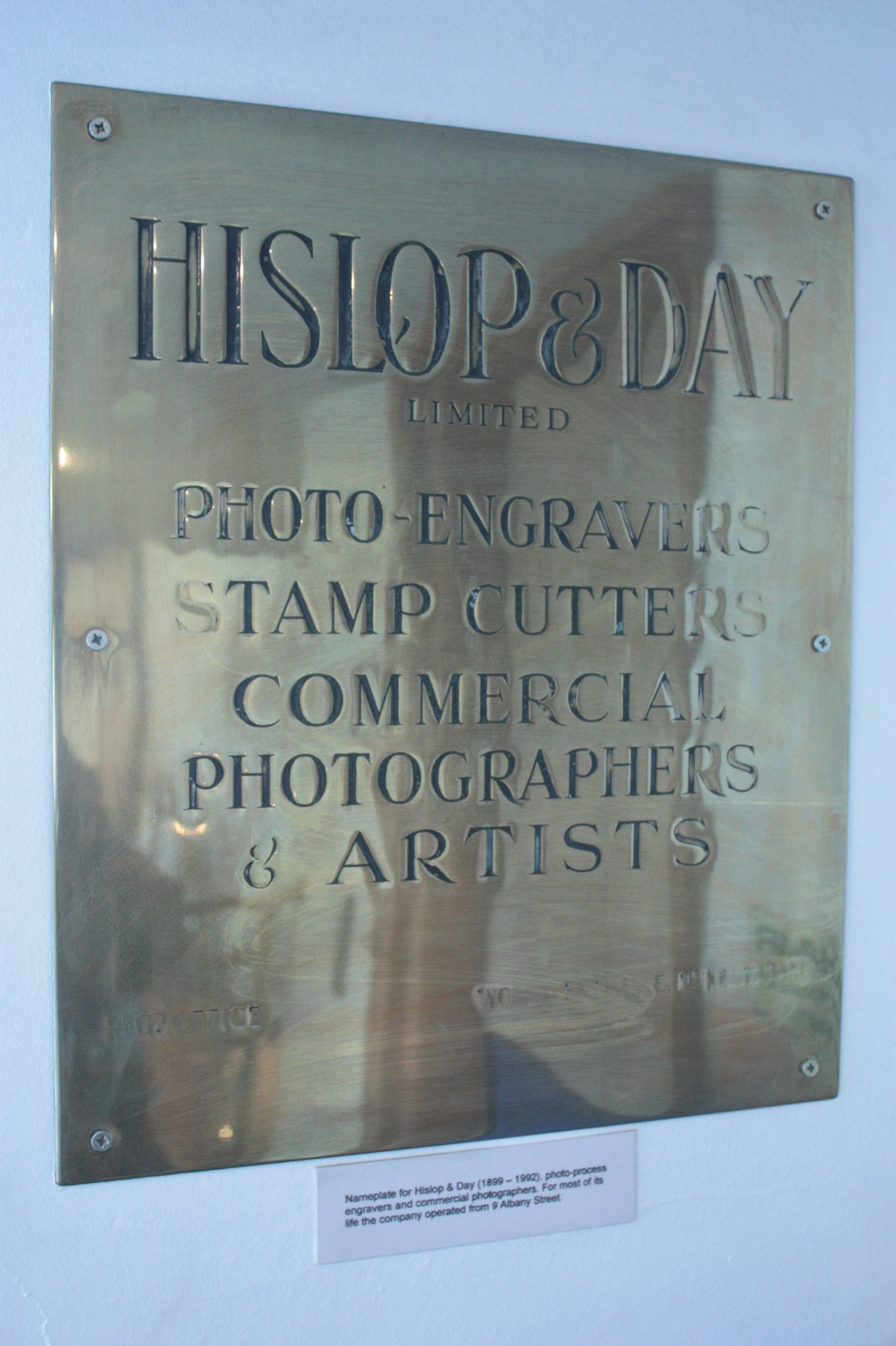
The shop sign for Hislop and Day preserved in the Peoples Story Museum, Edinburgh

Thomas Cuthbert Day FRSE EGS FCS (1852–1935) was a British chemist, photo-engraver and geologist. He was the joint founder of the firm Hislop & Day who made major advances in the reproduction of photographs in printed books. Day also independently published books showing their skills in printing photographs in books, utilising his own photographs and text, and usually published under T. C. Day.

== Life ==
He was born in Burton-on-Trent the son of Rev Henry Day who was headmaster of the Grammar School. Originally adopting a life in the brewing industry (typical of Burton-on-Trent, and having moved to Edinburgh to pursue that career, his religious views led him to abandon this in the 1890s and instead pursue a new use for his chemical skills. After some studies in Europe, he began a photo-engraving business.

In 1894 he joined Edinburgh photographer John Hislop and in 1897 they formed Hislop and Day. They moved to new premises at 9 Albany Street in the Edinburgh New Town in 1901. The company survived until 1963.

In 1917 he was elected a Fellow of the Royal Society of Edinburgh. His proposers were fellow-geologists John Horne, Benjamin Peach, Sir John Smith Flett, and Cargill Gilston Knott. In Edinburgh his address was 36 Hillside Crescent an attractive flat just north of Calton Hill. He was President of the Edinburgh Geological Society 1921–2.

He died in Edinburgh on 13 June 1935. He left £500 to the Edinburgh Geological Society in his will.

== Publications ==
- The Influence of Light on the Respiration of Barley and Wheat (a brewing textbook)
- Notes on the Hummell Rocks, Gullane (1912)
- Notes on the Inchcolm Anticline (1928)
- Arthur’s Seat: A Ruined Volcano (1933)
