= John George Bartholomew =

British cartographer and geographer (1860-1920)

John George Bartholomew FRSE FRGS
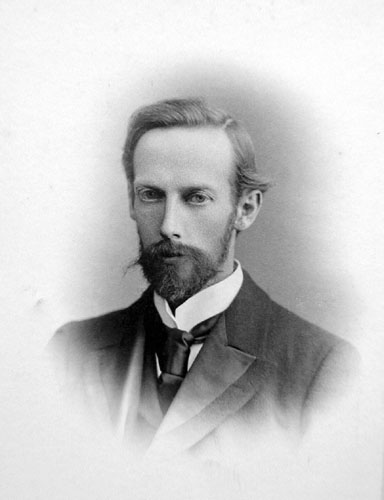
- Born: 22 March 1860; Edinburgh, Scotland, UKGBI
- Died: 14 April 1920 (aged 60); Sintra, Portugal
- Education: University of Edinburgh (didn't graduate)
- Occupations: Cartographer; geographer
- Spouse: Janet Bartholomew (m. 1889)
- Children: 5, including Ian Bartholomew
- Father: John Bartholomew Jr.
- Relatives: John Christopher Bartholomew (grandson); John Bartholomew Sr. (grandfather)
- Awards: Victoria Medal, 1905

John George Bartholomew FRSE FRGS (22 March 1860 – 14 April 1920) was a British cartographer and geographer. As a holder of a royal warrant, he used the title "Cartographer to the King"; for this reason he was sometimes known by the epithet "the Prince of Cartography".

Bartholomew's longest lasting legacy is arguably naming the continent of Antarctica, which until his use of the term in 1890 had been largely ignored due to its lack of resources and harsh climate.

== Biography ==
Bartholomew was born on 22 March 1860 in Edinburgh to John Bartholomew Jr, a cartographer, and Annie Bartholomew (née McGregor; 1836–1872). A member of the Bartholomew family of geographers and map publishers, he was the paternal grandson of John Bartholomew Sr, a cartographer, engraver and founder of John Bartholomew and Son.

Educated at the Royal High School, Bartholomew later enrolled at the University of Edinburgh but did not graduate.

== Career ==
Under his administration the family business became one of the top operations in its field. Bartholomew himself was not merely a specialist in production, but also a talented geographer and cartographer. It was he who introduced the use of coloured contour layer maps developed by his father; he also anticipated the needs of late nineteenth and early 20th century travellers by publishing street maps of major cities, cycling maps, railway timetable maps, and road maps for automobiles.

He collaborated with major scientific figures and travelers of the period on projects involving their studies. Bartholomew's Atlas of Meteorology and Atlas of Zoogeography were issues from a planned five-volume series that was never completed. Before he died he was able to plan out the first edition of the Times Survey Atlas of the World; this and its succeeding editions represent the most successful atlas project of the twentieth century. John was a great friend of geographer and writer John Francon Williams. Correspondence between the two friends is held in the Bartholomew Archive at the National Library of Scotland. Williams also acted as a literary agent for Bartholomew in America, the UK and other territories in the world.

He handed the reins of the business to his son Ian Bartholomew (1890–1962).

== Personal life ==
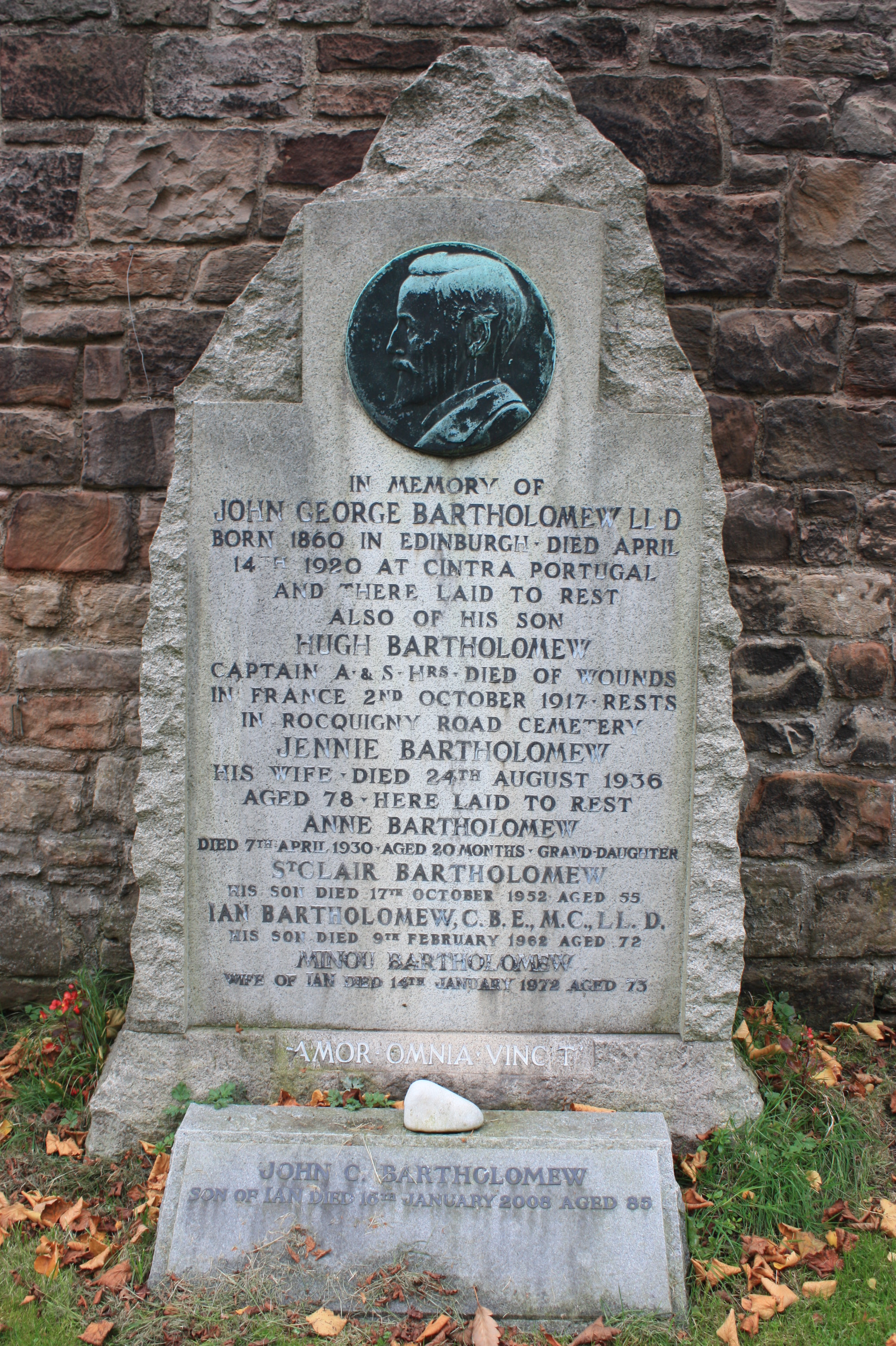
The memorial to J G Bartholomew in Dean Cemetery in Edinburgh

On 23 April 1889, Bartholomew married Janet "Jennie" Bartholomew (née Macdonald). The couple had 5 children, including the cartographer and geographer Ian Bartholomew.

On 14 April 1920, Bartholomew died in Sintra, Portugal aged 60. Bartholomew was buried at the São Pedro de Penaferrim Cemetery.

A memorial to Bartholomew, sculpted by Pilkington Jackson, exists on the northern wall of the 20th century extension to Dean Cemetery in Edinburgh. His wife Jennie, sons Hugh and Ian, and grandson John Christopher Bartholomew are buried at the monument.

== Legacy ==
On the centenary of Bartholomew's death (14 April 2020), he was commemorated publicly and named as a publisher who helped to put 'Edinburgh on the map'.
