= John Bartholomew Sr. =

Scottish cartographer and engraver (1805–1861)

John Bartholomew
- Cartographer and engraver
- Born: 26 April 1805
- Died: 8 April 1861 (aged 55)

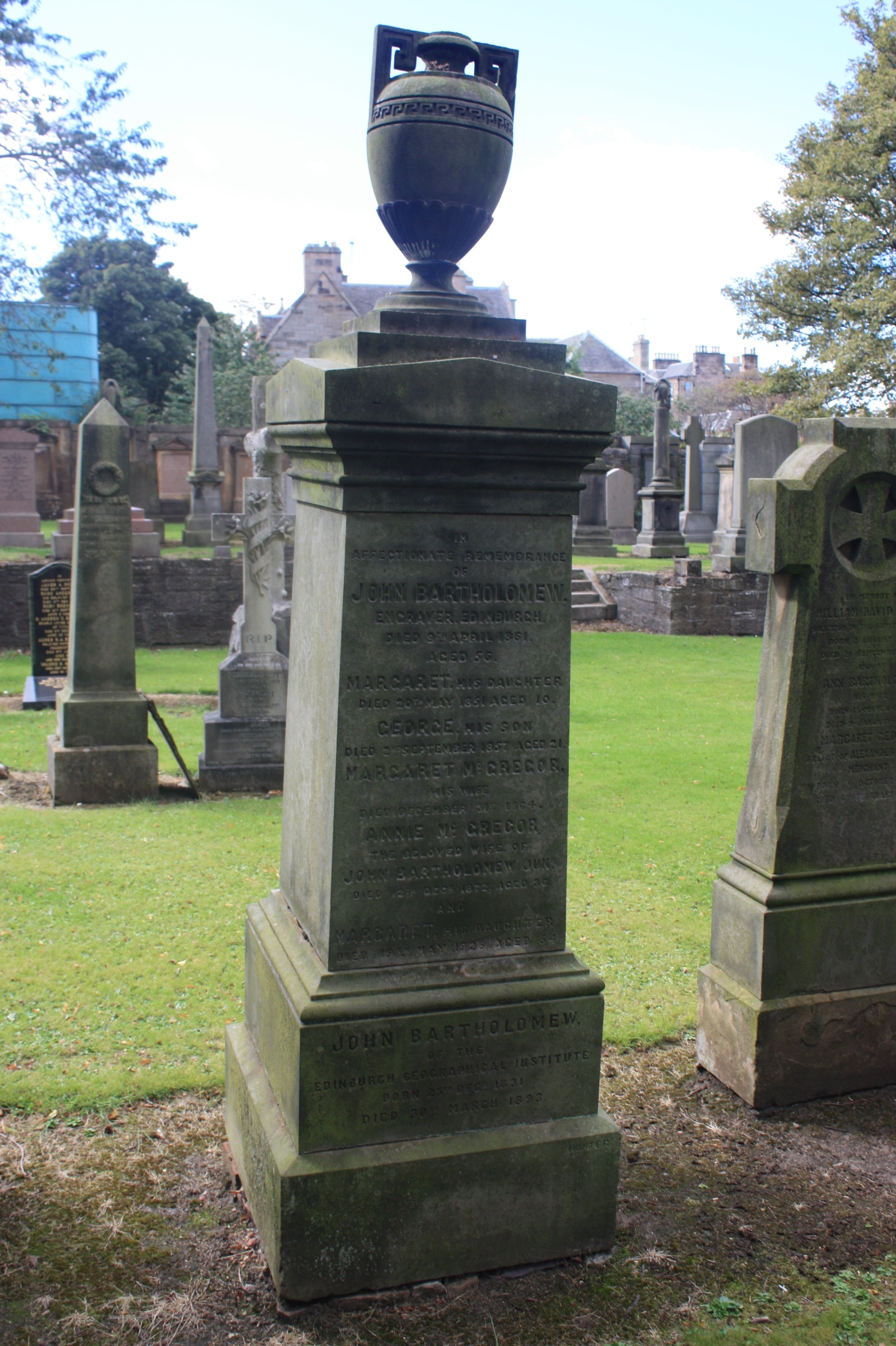
Bartholomew grave, Grange Cemetery, Edinburgh

John Bartholomew, Senior. (26 April 1805 – 8 April 1861) was a Scottish cartographer and engraver.

== Life ==
The son of George Bartholomew, engraver (1784–1871), John founded the engraving and mapmaking firm of John Bartholomew and Son Ltd. in 1826.

He was a master copper plate engraver and engraved some fine maps for local Edinburgh firms, such as street maps for Lizars, others for the Encyclopædia Britannica and for some educational publishers like A & C Black. John Sr. was the ideal person to inaugurate what became one of the most admired cartographic institutions in the world. A man of high standards, as were his successors; he was an accomplished engraver, engraving becoming the foundation of the firm; lithography would follow later. He also had the vision to recognise the potential for the firm.

In 1859, shortly before he died, John Senior passed the business on to his son John Bartholomew Junior (1831–1893).

He is buried with his wife, Margaret McGregor in the north-west section of Grange Cemetery. His son and his wife are buried with him.
