= Schlichting =

Schlichting is a German surname. Notable people with the surname include:

- Bernard Schlichting, (1838–1884) American politician in Wisconsin
- Hermann Schlichting (1907–1982), German engineer
- Joachim Schlichting (1914–1982), German major
- Jonas Schlichting, 17th-century German-Polish Socinian theologian
- Kurt C. Schlichting, American sociologist and anthropologist
- Lars Schlichting (born 1982), German footballer
- Mark Schlichting, American publisher and author
- Sigismund von Schlichting (1829–1909), Prussian general and military theorist
- Reinhard Schlichting (1835–1897), American politician in Wisconsin
