= Arthur's Teacher Trouble =

1986 children's book by Marc Brown

- Author: Marc Brown
- Illustrator: Marc Brown
- Language: English
- Series: Arthur
- Genre: Children's literature
- Publisher: Little, Brown and Company; The Living Books Company
- Publication date: 1986
- Publication place: United States
- Media type: Print (Paperback)
- Pages: 30
- ISBN: 978-0-87113-091-4
- OCLC: 13185290
- Preceded by: Arthur's Tooth
- Followed by: Arthur's Baby

Arthur's Teacher Trouble is a book in the Arthur series, released in 1986. It was written by Marc Brown and published by Little, Brown and Company and The Living Books Company.

== Plot ==
On the first day of school, Arthur and his classmates are given homework by the teacher Mr. Ratburn, leaving them distraught. Later, the principal, Mr. Haney, announces that there will be a Spellathon in the coming weeks. One day, Mr. Ratburn tells the class to study hard for a test to see who will qualify as representatives for the Spellathon. Eventually, Arthur and The Brain end up being chosen and are given lists of words to study. On the day of the Spellathon, the representatives of each class are eliminated one by one until Arthur is the only one left. He manages to win the trophy after spelling "Preparation" correctly. In the end, Mr. Ratburn announces to the audience that he will be teaching Kindergarten, much to D.W.'s dismay.

== Adaptations ==
=== Computer game ===
Rereleased box cover of the computer game

The book was adapted into a computer game by Living Books in 1992. It was later turned into a smartphone app in 2012. It is the first of five Arthur books to be adapted into a computer game, and the second game released from the Living Books series. Unlike the television series, which separated the original book into two mini-episodes, the game keeps the story as one.

=== Television episodes ===
The title was also adapted into two television episodes in the Arthur TV series. They were titled as "Arthur and the Real Mr. Ratburn" and "Arthur's Spelling Trubble." The episodes aired together on October 8, 1996. VHS releases of "Arthur and the Real Mr. Ratburn" change the title card to "Arthur's Teacher Trouble" to reference the original book.

== Reception ==
Initial critical reception for the book was mostly positive, with the Living Books adaptation being particularly praised. The Living Books adaptation was given a platinum award at the 1994 Oppenheim Toy Portfolio Awards. The judges praised the program's "good-natured sense of humor" and said that "[e]very page bursts with images that come to life" The editors of Electronic Entertainment presented Arthur's Teacher Trouble with their 1993 "Best Edutainment Title" award. They wrote, "The most captivating thing about Arthur's Teacher Trouble—the best installment in Broderbund's excellent Living Books series—is how kids immediately identify with the characters and the story."

Later critical reviews expressed concern over the media effects of the book, with David Wray stating in Literacy: Major Themes in Education that much of the effects were "incongruent to the story". Matt Jackson of the Children's Literature Association commented that the Living Book software's features gave off the impression that "passivity is bad" and questioned the product's packaging phrasing of "Children don't just read them. They live them.", in that it inferred that books were inferior to CD-Roms. Jackson also criticized the book's usage of stereotypes, such as Arthur's teacher Mr. Ratburn being a "stereotypical male teacher — a mean disciplinarian, a student's worst fear". Ann Trousdale also criticized the stereotyping of Ratburn, writing that he "dominates and oppresses his students" and is almost a caricature.
