= Discis Knowledge Research =

Discis Knowledge Research is a company, founded in Toronto in 1988, that acquired rights to children's stories and published them as CD-ROM-based interactive children's books.

== History ==
By 1993, the company had published 20 interactive titles including The Tale of Peter Rabbit by Beatrix Potter, The Tell-Tale Heart by Edgar Allan Poe, and Thomas’ Snowsuit by Robert Munsch. That year, Discis had sold more than 300,000 discs, primarily across North America.

Discis' two main brands are Little Kids Can Read and Kids Can Read. Users can "have words defined, hear pronunciations, identify parts of speech, and have access to questions and commentary." MacUser wrote that series like Living Books and Kids Can Read "operate on two levels" by letting players follow the story narrative and by exploring the story's contents.

Discis Books is a series of Interactive storybook by Discis Knowledge Research.

Entertainment Weekly wrote that "interactive storybooks" like Living Books' Harry and the Haunted House series promoted "less reading comprehension in kids" than "moderately interactive, more fact-oriented" CD-ROMs like Discis Books’ Thomas’ Snowsuit.

== Kids Basics ==
Kids Basics is a sister series of four educational video games by Discis Knowledge Research of Toronto, targeted to children aged three to six who are learning to read. The series was created "in an effort [for Discis Knowledge] to broaden its coverage of the children’s market for multimedia". The brand began shipping on February 28, 1994. The titles are written by Susan Amerikaner and illustrated by Judy Ziegler. MacUser said My Silly CD of Counting was "funny" and "effective".

=== Kids Basics titles ===
- My Silly CD of ABCs
- My Silly CD of Counting
- My Silly CD of Colors
- My Silly CD of Opposites.
