= Living Books =

Interactive storybook series

- Genres: Edutainment, interactive storybook
- Developers: Broderbund (1992–1994, 1997–1998); Living Books (1994–1997); Wanderful Interactive (2012–2014); Houghton Mifflin Harcourt (2014–present)
- Publishers: Broderbund (1992–1998); Random House (1994–1997); The Learning Company (1998–1999); Mattel Interactive (1999–2000); The Gores Group (2000–2001); Riverdeep (2001–2004); Houghton Mifflin Harcourt (2004–present); Wanderful Interactive Storybooks (2012–present); Jordan Freeman Group (2023–present)
- Platforms: Microsoft Windows, Mac OS, iOS, Android
- First release: 7 February 1992

Living Books is a series of interactive read-along adventures aimed at children aged 3–9. Created by Mark Schlichting, the series was mostly developed by Living Books for CD-ROM and published by Broderbund for Mac OS and Microsoft Windows. Two decades after the original release, the series was re-released by Wanderful Interactive Storybooks for iOS and Android.

The series began in 1992 as a Broderbund division that started with an adaptation of Mercer Mayer's Just Grandma and Me. In 1994, the Living Books division was spun off into its own children's multimedia company, jointly owned by Broderbund and Random House. The company continued to publish titles based on popular franchises such as Arthur, Dr. Seuss, Berenstain Bears, and Reading Rainbow.

In 1997, Broderbund agreed to purchase Random House's 50% stake in Living Books and proceeded to dissolve the company. Broderbund was acquired by The Learning Company, Mattel Interactive, and The Gores Group over the following years, and the series was eventually passed to Houghton Mifflin Harcourt, which currently holds the rights. The series was kept dormant for many years until former developers of the series acquired the license to publish updated and enhanced versions of the titles under the Wanderful Interactive Storybooks series in 2010.

The series has received acclaim and numerous awards.

== History ==
=== Conception ===
==== Inspiration and pitch ====
The initial motivation behind the series came from a childhood fantasy of Mark Schlichting's to enter into the picture book world of Dr. Seuss's Horton Hears a Who!; to visit the houses of Whoville and interact with the "weird and fantastical instruments and contraptions". As a boy, he was enamoured by the fantasy worlds of children's picture books through Dr. Seuss and the magic of animation through Disney. Further inspiration came out of his concern as a father to video gaming boys. By 1986 Schlichting had "Nintendo guilt", observing how his sons were engaged with Nintendo titles for hours, working cooperatively and diligently, but unable to focus on their homework. Their focus was on level mastery, but they couldn't find any titles both educational and fun enough to hold their interest. Schlichting wanted this same level of cognitive involvement with something more substantive, matching the attention-grabbing play aspects of popular games with meaningful content. He devised a concept of "highly interactive animated picture books for children" that would "delight and engage kids but that also had real learning content as well", which would evolve into Living Books.

After receiving a degree in fine arts and working as a book publishing art director, he retrained in traditional animation. Schlichting entered the children's software industry in 1987, and was contracted as a freelance animator and digital illustrator at Broderbund Software for early floppy disk PC games including games within the Carmen Sandiego franchise such as Europe and U.S.A. By 1988, Schlichting's work at Broderbund led to him securing a full-time position at the company. Schlichting later admitted that he accepted the job offer to be able to sell his concept to Broderbund, believing that the best way to talk Broderbund into spending $1,000,000 on a product for a market that didn't exist was from within the company. After three months, Broderbund permitted him to create a small prototype in-house, and as source material he used a book he had illustrated called I'm Mine. The "deceptively simple" premise saw Schlichting take the children's story, computerize the artwork, and offer kids the choice of having the computer read the story to them or "play" inside the pages of the book. The title 'Living Books' was chosen to represent that everything in the environment is alive and for the player to experiment with.

The then-unknown designer began pitching the CD-ROM-based Living Books around the company "to anyone who would listen" and presented his prototype to demonstrate the concept. Schlichting argued that the "driving force" to make these storybooks interactive was due to the "natural draw and deep interest" that children experience with technological interaction like games; he therefore wanted to offer the ability to "explore and learn through discovery at their own pace". He pitched, "I wanted to harness some of that natural draw that computers have for kids...You know how flowers follow the sun? That's called heliotropism. Well, kids have a 'computertropism'". He "lobbied his bosses" to allow him start a CD-ROM division that would "add a new dimension to children's books", pitching to increasingly senior staff from his superior Michele Bushneff, to her boss Vice President of Broderbund John Baker, and eventually reaching Broderbund co-founder and CEO Doug Carlston, all of whom offered encouragement in different ways. Baker felt that the idea of talking computer books was "obvious and simple" and that it was difficult to imagine them holding the interest of a child; he also thought that animated parents could create the same amount of "involvement and character identification" as an onscreen book through their real-life storytelling. However, he conceded that the medium offered an opportunity to "charm" the user through its design.

==== Approval and prototypes ====
In 1989, Dutch electronics hardware manufacturer Phillips happened to observe the Living Books prototype while on a tour of the Broderbund offices, and offered the company $500,000 to produce a title that would run on a new television set-top box they were in the process of developing. As a result, after four months of pitching Schlichting was given the go-ahead by Carlston to put together a prototype using an early version of what became MacroMedia Director. Carlston was drawn to the idea because he had noticed a demographic trend of births among Broderbund staff jumping to 15 a year, suggesting a "demand for software to help small children learn". Living Books married this demographic trend to new CD-ROM technology that Schlichting was interested in. Baker was put in charge of Living Books. According to St. Louis Post-Dispatch, Schlichting "persuaded his employer" to "spend millions of dollars on his notion to create Living Books". As a result, Schlichting's demo concept became a development group. By 1990, the Broderbund's Living Books group had less than five people.

After a few months of development, the first fully-featured prototype for Living Books was complete; it was an adaption of Mercer Mayer's Little Monsters at School. This beta version included two pages to demonstrate how a transition might work, had the main character narrate the story, and included highlighted text as he read. Schlichting and his son provided the voices for the baby and the young protagonist respectively. The product was designed as a "reading product" as well as a storybook; Schlichting wanted children to have a "relationship with the text". He turned off the mouse cursor until the story was read so they had to watch the words. Schlichting utilised a "child-informed design approach", playtesting the game for children and listening to their feedback, thereby allowing children to "contribute to and critique product development" He wanted the programs to not only be made "for kids" but "with kids". The offices were filled with toys and none of the staff wore ties. The original concept saw a child narrator deliver the story from a prosthenian arch with the text above their head, but upon play-testing Schlichting discovered that children's eyes were fixated on the narrator's mouth and they weren't following the words, which led to a less-in-more design decision. To resolve this, he had the highlighted text as the only animation with nothing else moving, so users focused on the words while the story was being read, followed by the animated action. Schlicting took teacher's comments seriously and "incorporated their suggestions into the designs". Feedback offered by teachers included a request to make to program simple and straightforward to use so they wouldn't have to become technology experts. The prototype was ultimately successful, though the developers also noted the delayed reactions once hotspots were clicked which affected the game's interactivity. Michael Coffey was brought in as their first programmer to help the team work out the technology required to implement their ideas. Meanwhile, Broderbund publicly announced the Living Books project of CD-ROM animated, talking children's stories in August 1991.

Mercer Meyer's popular children's book Just Grandma and Me was chosen as the premiere title of the new series, as their initial attempt at "eras[ing] the line between learning and playing". This was because he owned the book rights outright which made negotiation easier; Meyer opted not to collaborate directly with Living Books on the adaption, though he did offer approvals during development. With the support of Broderbund management, the team evolved into the Living Books Broderbund division; they moved to an open office area and added more staff who were allocated to the project. Schlichting originally served as Living Books' creative director, and in 1996, he would be promoted to VP of research and design. Schlichting commented, "it became clear that I was not selling a product idea, but creating a shared vision about how we could make a difference, and that shared vision influenced how the entire company felt about our work together for many years to come".

=== Development (1990–1992) ===
==== Creative arts ====
Living Books development process

"Grandma and Me, the first title, took three years to develop (included basic technology). Now [1993] a particular title currently takes 6 months to a year. Typical crew has 6 or 7 full time character animators. Initial design work on a storybook page (gag planning, etc.) is a 4–5 hour session. Two additional people ("quasi-programmers") "assemble" the character animation into the proprietary format. Two more people do the sound effects and music."

— Notes by John Peterson and Mark Gavini, adapted from Schlicting presentation at 1993 ACM SIGGRAPH Conference

Though storyboards and layouts were often sketched out on paper, most of the animation was developed straight into the software instead of being scanned first. All the creative assets were developed on the Mac, as Living Books believed their media tools were the most advanced. The team used Photoshop for basic painting and Illustrator for work that required scaling as it moves; meanwhile the animation was completed in Adobe Director, and followed by being converted to a special format using Broderbund's proprietary rendering/interaction engine. Technical designer Barbara Lawrence worked on digital backgrounds, while ex-Disney animator Don Albrecht assisted with animations. Animators like Donna Bonifield worked in the attic with rows of CRT screen computers in a room that reached 120 degrees. Schlichting opted for an animation style instead of using live video clips.

As Broderbund didn't have a recording studio, sound designer Tom Rettig individually recorded and saved each audio file in a small office. Living Books' first full time sound designer and musician, Joey Edleman, wrote the Living Books theme and dance themes for their earlier stories. Edelman had previously worked at Computers and Music, a pioneering audio software company that would be used to develop the sound of Living Books; software companies Digidesign or Opcode asked Edleman what sounds they wanted for his projects to be released in upcoming versions of their programs. Roy Blumenfeld served as audio engineer for The Cat in the Hat. When Schlichting created a sound effect for a falling leaf, he named it "Ode to Goofy" in honour of the Disney character. Schlichting sought colleagues to serve as voice actors, and this process helped the office to become invested and champion the project. Often, ancillary characters were played by Living Books staff; Grandma in Just Grandma and Me was played by Schlichting himself and his son played Little Creature; meanwhile sound designers Bob Marshall and Edelman played Tortoise and Hare in The Tortoise and the Hare. One scene containing in motion cabbages required the entire staff to go into the sound studio and run around. It took up to 15 takes to record words and sentences correctly; they had been recorded carefully in order to get speech right.

The sound designers found it difficult to achieve exact sync when sound, CD-ROM, and animation play at varying speeds on different CPU machines. The animation also had to be carefully tuned in order to match the speed limitations of low end machines. Issues could arise with assets like a Bus coming onto the screen with a large part missing off screen. The team noted any times that child playtesters started clicking before the end of a gag, as this was a sign it wasn't working. In some cases, sound is emphasized to compensate for the limits in animation. Graphic technician Rob Bell served as a bridge between the animators and programmers, editing the artists' work to fit into the program and advocating for program edits to fit the artist's vision. Karl Ackerman worked for Living Books as a prototyper, doing concept and programming work on games. Proposed product ideas that were ultimately unsuccessful included adaptions of Between the Lions, Eager Ogre's Pet Show, Nickelodeon's Rugrats, Sesame Street, and Sing Along: Maggie's Farm, among others, as well as a Story Book Maker title in 1996.

A group of Broderbund producers – Clair Curtain, Todd Power, and Rob Martyn – was brought in to help Living Books stay on budget and schedule. Around this time, Mickey Mantle was hired as Broderbund CTO and he became an advocate for his "pet project" Living Books, working closely with the programmers to ensure the work was delivered. Lucinda Ray joined Broderbund from 1993 to 1999 as Education Product Manager, where she managed the development and editing of more than 60 Teacher's Guides to accompany Brøderbund and Living Books' Living Books School Editions. From 1990, Donna Bonifield began in production roles and over four years became Living Books' Technical Creative Director in 1994. Living Books was considered as a skunkworks project by its team, which they believed was hidden from the main building to shield it. At one point Baker who by this point had championed the series, tried to raise money from potential investors at Sony to be able to continue the fledgling project. Edelman jokingly referred to the working conditions as a sweatshop; meanwhile Lawrence shared an office room with Schlichting and frequently heard his disagreeable phone calls.

==== Programming ====
Schlichting campaigned for tools technologically ahead of their time to improve quality. In the early 1990s, CD-ROMs represented a "dramatic leap forward" and the promise that computers could offer immersive, interactive experiences. Software designers such as Schlichting looked to the new medium as an opportunity to reinvent the classic children's book". In response, Broderbund offered Schlichting an additional team of programmers. At this point in time, most Broderbund products were built primarily by one programmer per title, with assistance from contractors along the way. However, Schlichting wanted an engine that would allow the game to be pre-emptively designed to play across multiple platforms (Mac, PC, etc.), thereby allowing the CD-ROM to become more interactive than it had in the past.

Programmer Glenn Axworthy created the Living Books engine, which made it possible for products to be written in Macromedia Director, then to edit the files into a "cross-platform, optimized playback format" that slow speed CD-ROMs could then play into limited memory computers at the appropriate speed "regardless of the speed of the CPU of the computer running the product". The Living Books engine "served as the foundation for the entire product line" and the same underlying technology was still being used in 1998, just with better animation and interactive design. The playback engine was designed to work across platforms without the animation needing to be redone.

Matt Siegel created an animation driver that made "animations run consistently fast regardless of their size". This unique CD-ROM playback/interaction driver required three years of development using a core team of three programmers, who had to resolve issues such as compression, cross-platform operation, timing, and device control. The cutting-edge technology was used to make pages load, characters dance, and perfect the interactivity without much tweaking required. Key to the programming was in devising a way to allow for instantaneous mouse responses. This was "crucial", as without it playtesters would become frustrated by the delayed response to their mouse. The driver applied a "running man" during the delay between book pages, loading the animations while the program read the text aloud on each new page so they were ready to play. The driver would stream sound to occupy the user while images and animation were being loaded. This "trick", of turning off ambient movements until the biggest movement had finished playing, allowed Living Books to squeeze the program down to 2MB of ram.

Just Grandma and Me ended up using 128MB of the available CD-ROM space. Later, graphic technician Rob Bell expanded the program with the interpretive language S-Lang which offered even greater possibilities. This driver allowed the creative team to work on quality without worrying about CD-ROM limitations. Schlichting considered the programmers the "hidden magic" behind Living Books. Further advancements made it easier to play; in 1996, a Living Books product would be used in a successful demo by Narrative Communications, in which Macromedia ShockWave compression and other technology was used to compress it from 2.5MB to 1.4MB. By 1997, Broderbund was able to "cram" eight Living Books titles onto a single CD-ROM as part of their Living Books Library series.

To run Just Grandma and Me, a computer required the following hardware specifications and system requirements: a PC with an 80386 processor and 512x384, four megabytes of memory, a VGA monitor and adapter capable of displaying 256 colors or a 386 "MPC" machine with SuperVGA, a CD-ROM (compact disk) drive and a sound card compatible with Sound Blaster, Pro Audio Spectrum or Tandy sound devices, plus a Microsoft Windows operating environment." It also had to be able to run on computers ranging from a Mac LC to a Quadra 800, with consistent responsiveness.

Noting that the market for Intel/MPC machines was double that of Mac market, Schlicting looked into alternative systems to design Living Books for. He investigated CD-I devices like Phillips but found the "resolution low, the interface clunky, and the format difficult to work with". As the series was mouse-driven, he found Nintendo style game controllers inappropriate; however, he thought the 3DO had "a lot of promise". In the end no alternative systems would be used, except for the Tandy Video Information System and Philips CD-i consoles, on which Just Grandma and Me and Little Monster at School were released within a few months of their respective releases on PC/Mac. Just Grandma and Me accompanied Tandy's launch in October 1992, and the title suited Tandy's positioning as "provid[ing] fun in the process of learning" instead of being a video gaming console; Living Books users were able to engage with hotspots used their remote control.

In September 1991, Doug Carlston told Digital Media “It's usually a truism that as storage capacity expands, costs go up accordingly... But this isn't the case for CD's which for 75 cents hold what would cost $5 to store on floppies", which is a significant margin increase for the lowered cost of goods in a $50 entertainment product". Doug suggested that the cost to produce a Living Book would "eventually be under $100,000 — 'substantially less' than a typical floppy-based title". He noted, “At this point, we're building engines for each optical platform, so we can just go directly from the data stream to the product, with no programming at all. “When we started this project two years ago, we decided the ‘virtual machine’ approach was the only way it seemed to make sense — it was a simple programming question. There was no rush to market, because there was no market.”

=== Design ===
==== Interactivity design ====
Interactivity was vital in the design of the programs; when presenting demos to corporate executives, Schlichting would observe them fighting over the mouse and suggesting where to click. The games were packed with interactive hotspots. Schlichting chose to make "everything that looked clickable to actually be clickable", saturating each page with hotspots, to ensure the user was in control and supported in their decisions. He selected to existing picture books or designed books full of scenes that allowed for a wealth of exploration through clicking. All the objects, characters and individual words were "alive" and triggered by contact. Some hotspots were related to the story. However, peripheral "fun" hot spots were only added sparingly, so they would add surprise and offer "intermittent reinforcement" to encourage further exploration. Examples in Just Grandma and Me include: clams that sing in perfect three-part harmony, and a starfish that performs a vaudevillian routine with a top hat and cane. Interaction was designed to be "non-obvious", with hotspots including inanimate objects like chairs. On average, Arthur's Computer Adventure has 23 hotspots per screen, while five activities are included within the program. The Tortoise and the Hare contained around seven times as many incidental hot spots as supplemental ones. The gags were more layered in Dr Seuss’ ABC such that the user could click the same hotspot multiple times and get different responses. Arthur's Teacher Trouble had secret paper aeroplanes on every page; the Broderbund hint hotline received calls into the early morning asking where these planes were hidden.

Activities were added to help develop matching, rhyming, memory and observation skills, among others. Each activity has three levels of difficulty. Stellaluna contained a 'Bat Quiz" to teach scientific facts about bats. Arthur's Reading Race contains an activity called Let Me Write, which allows kids to drag and drop screen objects onto a simple sentence to modify it or create their own. The title also contained a spelling mini-game, separate from the story, which users could play against an opponent or the computer. In Arthur's Computer Adventure, which combined a storybook with an activity center, users were able to play the in-universe title Deep Dark Sea that is central to the plot. The soundscape was important to the series; each title consists of hundreds of digital voices and sound effects, such as waves splashing, breezes blowing, and birds chirping in the case of Just Grandma and Me. Some of the sound effects were "clever", for example the poppy flowers made popping noises, and the rocks performed rock 'n' roll guitar riffs. One of the later titles The Berenstain Bears In the Dark featured an all-original soundtrack featuring bluegrass musicians, including Mike Marshall, Sally van Meter, Tony Furtado, and Todd Phillips, while Stellaluna had a soundtrack with original music interwoven with African percussion. The band The Wild Mangos provided original songs for The Tortoise and the Hare, while Gary Schwantes produced music for Dr Seuss's ABC. Harry and the Haunted House came with 9 original songs which could be played on a CD player. The original songs in Sheila Rae, the Brave, about the adventures of a mouse heroine, featured lyrics that turn into pictures of the things they describe to encourage word recognition. They were written by Living Books composer Pat Farrell. In 1996, Living Books released their first sing-along animated storybook program.

Upon previewing a gag in Just Grandma and Me where a bird swoops across the screen with an aeroplane sound effect, developers noted this elicited laughs and chuckles in the audience. The developers realised that with their visual awareness focused on the animation, the incongruent audio had a more subconscious cognitive impact, and the discrepancy between sound and audio created a "brain hiccup" where users would find the moment 'cute' but unsure exactly why.

==== Ease of use design ====
The decisions on the "Quit" screen are presented as a straight-forward "Yes" or "No", as part of the series' ease-of-use design philosophy. The last CD-ROM game to use this "Quit" screen style was Arthur's Computer Adventure.

Ease of use was another important design philosophy; the interface was designed such that it could be used by even the youngest of children unaccompanied. Schlichting wanted the series to be "as easy to use as CD-audio". Decisions are presented as a straightforward choice, and "'yes' or 'no'" is consistently used throughout. Dust Or Magic, Creative Work in the Digital Age asserted that this is an application of Brenda Laurel's "communities of agents" concept in which 'helper characters engage in direct dialogue with the player and invite complicity"; it notes that in the Quit screen, the 'Yes' character nods mischievously as if to say "Go on, do it!", so that the player is urged to ignore the 'No' character who appears anxious and forlorn.

Schlichting observed that teachers wanted something to occupy children for 20 minutes at a time. They wanted to be able to say "You and you, go play with Living Books" then attend to the children needing support; as a result Living Books was designed to have no install and play as soon as the CD was inserted and users clicked on the icon.

When Schlichting was first designing Living Books, he visited computer stores to observe how software was displayed and marketed, and noted that they used their games' assets to show off the computer's capabilities. As a result, he developed an "attract mode" where at the beginning before the story starts, the main character direct addresses the user by introducing themselves, teaches the child how to play, and then invite them to participate. In Just Grandma and Me, the narrator Little Critter tells the user, "To have the story read to you, press this button. To play inside the story, press this button", pointing to the appropriate button onscreen.

Instead of repeating the talk loop, he opted for a dance loop with music that would encourage kids to dance in the store, bringing the products attention. Important to his design was to never leave the screen static; to always have a piece of animation playing to say to the user "I'm alive. I'm alive". Users had the option to flip to their chosen screen directly without having to wait for preceding pages to play out.

Living Books included the printed versions of the paperback books with the software to ensure there would be continuity where kids could play between the two and to encourage non-digital reading. Additionally, children were able to follow along in the physical book as the program read the story, and parents had the option of reading to the child the "old-fashioned way".

==== Language design ====
Schlicting's three basic concepts of design
for Living Books

1. Nobody wants to read the manual – software should work with non-readers (kids, 3yrs old and up). Must do interface testing with naive users. Don't need to read to use a living book – "agent" comes on screen and gives spoken instructions.
2. Nobody wants to wait – this is critical for acceptance by kids. Some original CD titles flopped because they were just too slow. Tests showed that if the delay was more than a second, kids would click again expecting a response, sometimes less than a second.
3. Everybody wants to be in control. There are no "wrong answers" in living books, this keeps it fun.

— Notes by John Peterson and Mark Gavini, adapted from Schlicting presentation at 1993 ACM SIGGRAPH Conference

A challenge of the series was to inviting children to engage with "black-and-white abstraction" of text, when the relatable imagery proved more inviting. Schlichting found that a program can capture 80% of a child's attention for spoken information that they can both see and interact with. Living Books experimenting with 'living' text, where children could tap on any word and hear it pronounced or build the whole sentence word by word. Schlichting chose to highlight the text because he "found kids follow anything that moves...we could get them to follow the reading if that was the only thing on the screen that was moving". One of the biggest benefits of using a CD-ROM was the "ability to store lots of high quality speech". Every word had to be recorded in two different styles, once as part of the story and once as individual words which could be clicked on one-by-one. The individual words were recorded with fluctuation to match how they would fit into the larger sentence; this allowed emerging readers to map the language and construct the story in sentence units. The New Kid on the Block, which presented a collection of 18 funny poems by poet Jack Prelutsky, allowed players to click on the words to reveal a representative animation of the noun or verb, turning the program into a "living dictionary". This was used as an alternative to having the player click on illustrations directly.

Both the first two titles in the series had English and Spanish language settings while Just Grandma and Me could also be played in French, German, and Japanese, all featured on the one disc; this multilingual feature would be explored in future entries. Most Living Books would be released in US English, UK English, and Spanish. The UK English versions had British accents for all the characters and colloquial words changed when appropriate (i.e., Mum not Mom). The New Kid on the Block is the only monolingual Living Book.

The British English dub was published by Brøderbund from 1996 to 2000, and a French dub was published by UbiSoft's Pointsoft label in 1996 While not released in Latin America the Latin Spanish dub was created in 1992/1993-1996 and released in the US version. Two titles were published in Hebrew in 1995, while four titles were dubbed and published into Japanese and Italian. Just Grandma and Me 2.0 featured a European Spanish dub. Delta's Livros Vivos saw the series published in Brazilian Portuguese in 1998, and the German dub by The Learning Company was published in 1998 after Broderbund's acquisition by the company.

Creating the localised editions often involved reworking the graphics, in order to sync the voices and avoid a ‘dubbed’ movie effect. While the series could be used for dual language learners, the titles did not come with a multilingual dictionary. The team also aimed to be "culturally correct" when translating to other languages, for instance the Arthur character "D.W." was renamed "Dorita" in Spanish after realising it was unusual for a local name to start with "W". Compute! suggested that "while the main goal of developing a multilingual program was more than likely an effort to increase its market share, doing so also enhances the story's educational value".

==== Education design ====
On the series' potential as a learning tool, Schlichting said, "software never replaces the place of a good teacher, but there are times when the teacher needs help" and that multimedia products "are great ways to do that". Schlichting resisted use of the term "Edutainment" to describe the series, though he felt the titles were more substantive than Nintendo games and described them as "invisible education." Marylyn Rosenblum, the vice president of education sales and marketing for Broderbund, commented, we don't make claims for teaching reading...[instead] we encourage children's natural love of reading."

Originally designed for children in preschool and early elementary aged three to eight, the storybooks found audiences ranging as young as two and some programs reached kids nine and older, Schlichting noted that while younger players would click the words in sequence to "map the story", older players will click the words out-of-order to build their own silly sentences, allowing for "greater language play". In Harry and the Haunted House, older players found amusement in creating the sentence "the zombie has a stinky but[t]". This was emergent gameplay Schlichting never intended or expected. The user was provided two options to engage, a passive 'read to me' mode and the interactive 'play along' mode. By offering different play patterns depending on the user's level of reading fluency players felt able to "own" the story by "playing with the individual pieces". Users learn to read new words and also discover how words are constructed into sentences. Arthur's Computer Adventure contains 401 words of interactive text estimated to be at grade 3 readability level. The series included moral lessons, for instance Berenstain Bears Get into a Fight was released to help children with conflict resolution.

Lucinda Ray, Education Product Manager at Brøderbund, developed the concept for, edited, and produced the Living Books School Edition. These School Editions were developed with the aid of classroom teachers, reading specialists, and curriculum experts, with an integrated language arts approach. School Editions contain: the CD-ROM, a print version of the title book, Lesson Plans, a thematic unit with activities, an annotated bibliography of relevant literature, printable worksheets, and bonus books or audio cassettes. They were designed specifically for teachers who are using the programs in a classroom, and included tech tips like shortcuts and special key commands to help guide the lesson. In 1994, Broderbund produced a supplementary set for teachers called the Living Books Framework, featuring integrated teaching material for each of the first four Living Books titles for $489.95 including the Living Books CD-ROMs; presented in a three-ring binder, they featured the original picture storybooks, several other books, and a tape of Jack Prelusky reading his 'The New Kid on the Block' poems. The kits also contained 'A Book Lover Approaches the Computer' articles that addressed key concerns of parents and teachers, technical tips, a curriculum matrix, a thematic unit, and classroom activities.

=== Independence (1992–1994) ===
==== Just Grandma and Me release ====
How Living Books changed Broderbund's mindset on CD-ROMs

In 1991, Broderbund made the first of its two great contributions to the history of CD-ROM publishing by releasing, as the inaugural title in its children's software arm, Living Books: One of the first CD-ROMs ever, it was an interactive reading primer called Just Grandma and Me. "Living Books was our bet on CD-ROM as a delivery vehicle," says [VP of marketing services at Broderbund Software Mason] Woodbury. "The success of Just Grandma And Me not only made our commitment to Living Books stronger, but also changed the mindset of our company. We said, 'Wow, this isn't just a small percentage of the potential market: All our products have to be CD-ROM.'"

— Michael Krantz in Marketing Computers (1995)

Broderbund released their reimagining of Just Grandma and Me in 1992, and while there was an initial concern whether there were enough customers with CD drives to run the game, in the first six months Broderbund sold over 10 times more copies than they had initially projected. MacUser did a speed test on the storybook to check the loading time when turning pages and found that most take less than 15 seconds. Meanwhile, not having his hand in the day-to-day creative process of that work turned Mayer on to the idea of doing CD-ROMs himself. He and his partner, John Sansevere, formed their own company Big Tuna New Media to develop Mayer's animated storybooks. Teaming up with GT Interactive, their first two titles were "Just Me and My Dad" (1995) and "Just Me and My Mom" (1996) which according to The Fresno Bee "borrow[ed]" their design from Living Books. Big Tuna New Media would be approached by Disney and DreamWorks for CD-ROM development deals".

By August 1992, the title was the interactive storybook's "first big hit", and one of the few available for purchase, along with the even earlier Canadian pioneer Discis Knowledge Research's Discis Books, whose 16 Mac titles and 11 CDTV titles had gained widespread classroom acceptance. Founded in 1988, Discis acquired the rights to children's stories and published them as CD-ROM-based interactive children's books. The second Living Books title, Arthur's Teacher Troubles, was debuted at Consumer Electronics Show showcasing its first 12 screens. When the game was demoed at trade shows, the developers observed audience reactions which proved to be a useful learning experience. Microsoft bought 300 disc copies and sent them to Multimedia PC hardware manufacturers, instructing them to ensure the software could run on their equipment. Before The Tortoise and the Hare was released, a prototype was shown at a trade show where a teacher in attendance noted that a scene where Hare picks up a newspaper, rolls it up, and stomps on it was encouraging kids to litter; in response Living Books redrew the scene, which now showed the tortoise scolding the hare, with the line of dialogue "Hey Hare, did you forget to recycle that newspaper?", who picks up the trash and disposes of it properly. Literacy in Australia: Pedagogies for Engagement singled out this moment for helping users "make sense of character motivations and actions".

Due to the success of the first few titles, the Living Books division had the ability to add additional artists and musicians, and the team relocated to a new Broderbund office in Novato, California. When Just Grandma and Me was demoed at the 1992 Computer Game Developers' Conference, the "mesmerized" crowd of around 100 game designers "spontaneously erupted into enchanted choruses of 'Ohhh!' and 'Ahhh!' with every turn of the page". Broderbund expected the Living Books division to become "one of their essential businesses in the years ahead", and planned more products for both the MPC and Mac. The following year, Schlichting demoed Just Grandma & Me, along with two new products, Arthur's Teacher Trouble and the in-development New Kid on the Block, at the 1993 ACM SIGGRAPH conference. In 1996, The Berenstain Bears in the Dark became the first Living Books title to utilise leveling by offering three different degrees of difficulty for its activities and the first to employ 640 x 480 pixel screen size (formerly 512 x 384). These early successes "set off a frenzy of imitation by other companies", of which 7th Level's TuneLand was deemed the best by The Washington Post.

==== Joint venture ====
Living Books
- Genre: Edutainment, interactive storybook
- Founded: 1992 (Broderbund division); 1994 (joint venture company)
- Fate: Dissolved on January 18, 1997
- Successor: Wanderful Interactive (spiritual successor)
- Headquarters: San Francisco
- Products: Living Books series; Little Ark Interactive
- Parent: Broderbund (1994–1997); Random House (1994–1997)

"Broderbund scored a major hit this year" with Living Books, PC Magazine said in December 1993. "At the American Booksellers Association convention, Alberto Vitale, head of Random House Publishing (then owned by Advance Publications) and Dr. Seuss book rights holder, saw a demo of Just Grandma and Me and approached the team. Vitale became impressed with the series and decided to buy half of Living Books. In her role as Technical Creative Director, Bonifield created the Living Books production methodology that facilitated the $15 million deal. On September 9, 1993, the Living Books Partnership Agreement was signed between Broderbund, Random House, Random House New Media (a new division set up by its president Randi Benton) and Broderbund's Living Books, forming Living Books as a joint venture between Broderbund and Random House to publish story-based multimedia software for children and was 50% owned by each. As Broderbund's shares had recently decreased, at the time analysts were concerned that this was due to Broderbund's older titles, and that the company had concentrated its growth in new venture.

Broderbund spun off Living Books into its own independent company, which started operations in January 1994 under Broderbund/Random House. While Broderbund offered the already-published Living Books product line and the resources to produce more interactive storybooks, Random House offered additional funding and access to its library of children's book authors. This gave Broderbund access to more book titles. The new Living Books took over research and development, manufacturing and marketing associated with the creation of its products, which were distributed through Broderbund and Random House' respective channels under an affiliated label arrangement for Windows and Mac. A relocation of Living Books offices to San Francisco was announced on July 31, 1995, which Vitale completed in October of that year. Living Books' staff of 45 worked out of the new site to develop, produce and market the software, while assembly and shipment of final products would continue to be performed at Broderbund's facility in Petaluma.

Unique for a kid's software company, this meant Living Books was created with a "strong, in-house foundation of experience" in all stages of the business, including product development, production, marketing and publicity. These were all coordinated at the Living Books headquarters in San Francisco. Meanwhile, assembly and shipping was handled by Broderbund's facility in Petaluma, California. Some of the titles were promoted via Distributor Softline, and Broderbund had accounts with retail stores like Musicland's Media Play and Trans World Music. Titles like Dr Seuss' ABC were available from mail order suppliers. Living Books became "one of the first alliances between dominant companies in their respective fields". The deal led to Broderbund's stock gaining $3.75 to $41. while the company's equity in income was boosted by approximately $3.9 million from the Living Books joint venture. Living Books heads Bonifield and Siegel left in 1994 to form digital video company Genuus, later commenting "at one time Broderbund was exciting, but it became big and lethargic". Jeff Schon, former Pee-wee's Playhouse producer, was brought in as CEO of Living Books and would lead the company for four years until 1997. From November 1995 – December 1996, Bobby Yarlagadda joined Living Books as VP and its first CFO, leading IT and Business Development groups; during this time he doubled the capacity for content production by setting up outsourcing contracts with suitable vendors. By 1997, the company was accepting product submissions from professional developers, and third-party outsourced production work on their website. After Yarlagadda's departure, he joined forces with Schlichting to set up software company The Narrative Communications Corporation while Schlichting was still at Living Books.

==== Dr. Seuss license ====
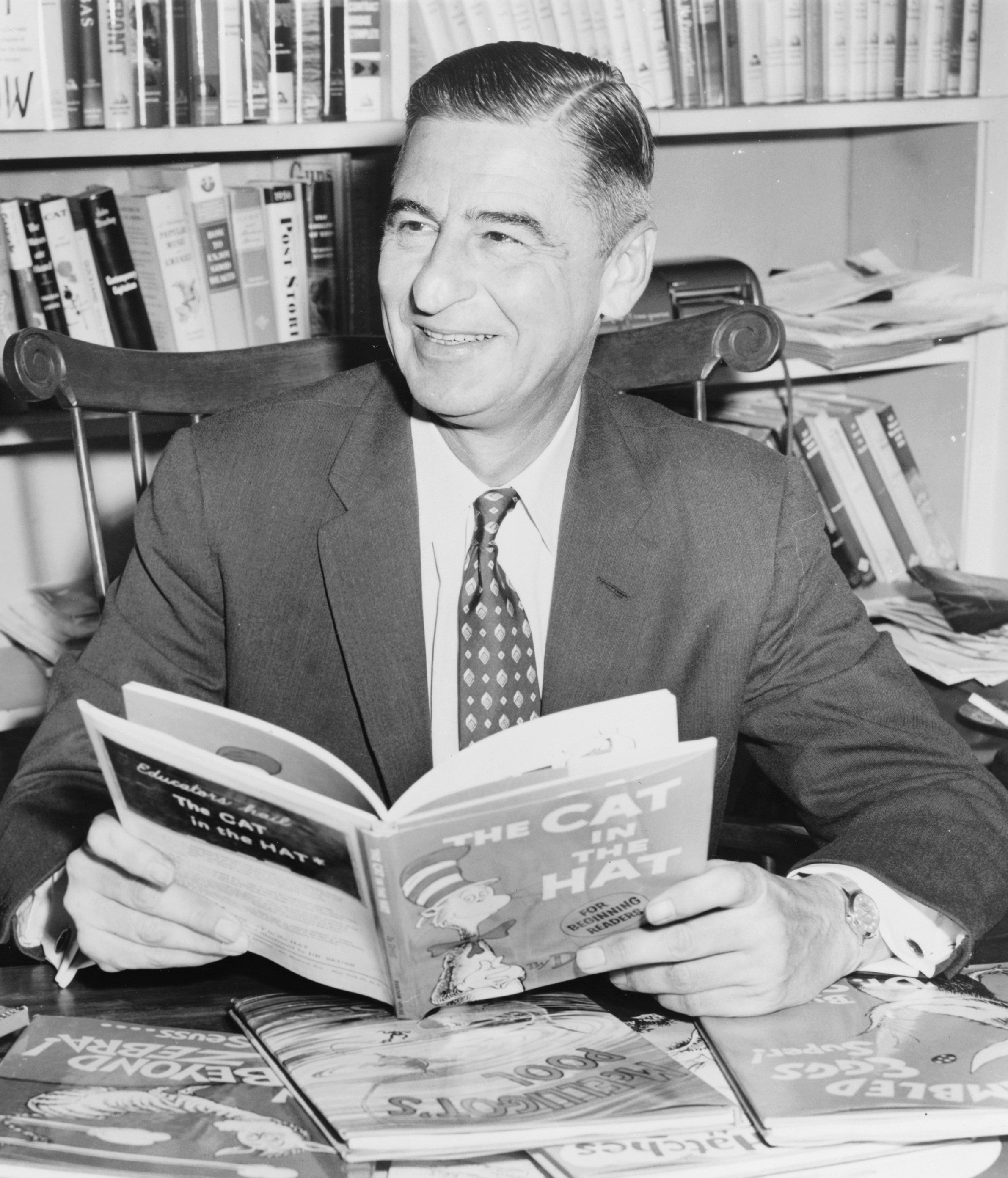
Living Books became the first company to create multimedia products featuring Dr. Seuss characters after securing the digital rights.

By 1994, there was a "scramble among multimedia developers to gobble up rights to intellectual property" for "translation to the new medium", and Dr. Seuss became "among the most hotly contested". Author Ted Geisel had died in 1991 and the multimedia rights to his works had become available. When Broderbund and Random House formed Living Books, their discussions centered around which books would be the best to adapt; once they discovered the Dr. Seuss rights were available they "went after them aggressively." Talent agency ICM Partners had arranged a parade of software firms including Microsoft, Paramount Interactive and Activision to visit Dr. Seuss' widow Audrey Geisel, chief executive of Dr. Seuss Enterprises and rights holder, who was known as a "fierce guardian of its artistic integrity". However, Vitale encouraged Living Books to present to Geisel in a bid to acquire the digital rights; Living Books created a demo which also incorporated Broderbund's paint product, Kid Pix using stickers from Dr. Seuss' book I Can Draw It Myself. After showing the demo in front of Geisel, Baker, Carlston, and Vitale in silence, Schlichting decided to tell the story of being inspired to enter into the world of Dr. Seuss as a child, leading to Geisel telling her intellectual property lawyers "I've changed my mind, I'm going to work with him".

While Geisel was not impressed with this first presentation and felt the demo was poor, she chose Living Books due to her "desire to honor her husband's 50-year association with Random House", giving them a second chance. Random House had been the sole publisher of the Dr. Seuss books since 1937. Brokered by Geisel's agency International Creative Management, Random House ended up securing the digital rights to Dr. Seuss for a deal said by a close source to be "well into the seven figures", and subsequently provided Living Books the "coveted" electronic rights to Dr. Seuss books along with other best-selling Random House children's authors. Signed and publicly announced in April 1994, the deal saw Living Books as the first company adapt Dr. Seuss to a digital format. Variety noted that the deal underscores how Living Books "positioned itself as a front-runner in the children's multi-media market", managing to secure a deal with Dr. Seuss Enterprises despite "competing companies offer[ing] richer financial packages". Their first Dr. Seuss title Dr Seuss' ABC was previewed at the 1995 Electronic Entertainment Expo to be released September that year, while The Cat in the Hat was in their future slate. Living Books aimed to publish up to 10 electronic titles the following year, including Dr. Seuss titles which would be released at the $40–$60 price point. Geisel was given approval rights on every stage of the Dr. Seuss Living Books products' development. Advertising Age saw Living Books' pending release of their first Dr. Seuss CD-ROMs as the industry's "most-watched developments". Geisel was present at the 1996 E3 Living Books booth to inaugurate the interactive version of Green Eggs and Ham, which was due for a release that Autumn.

=== Growth (1994–1996) ===
==== Commercial success ====
The games were highly financially successful. However, the low price point and large development costs, coupled with the recentness of CD-ROMS, made it difficult for Living Books to turn a profit. Additionally, at the time, the school market is still fledgling, and schools rarely had the funding to afford computers for their students; as a result most of Living Books' sales were into the home market. By 1995, Living Books would still be targeting its products at home buyers. In the first half of 1993, Broderbund sales jumped 69 percent, to $73 million, according to the Software Publishers Association, aided by Carmen Sandiego, Kid Pix, and the debut of Living Books. Just Grandma and Me became one of the best-selling CDs for children on its release in 1993. By August 1994, the series had sold tens of thousands of copies, and that year pre-tax profits of Living Books exceeded $6,000,000. By late 1994, the simultaneous success of best seller Myst (1993), and early learner Living Books had given the relatively small Broderbund dominance in two market segments. Broderbund's success allowed it to continue marketing to a mass consumer base, publishing software for entertainment, education, and home management; the company also offered a creatively free environment for its programmers who were able to push the boundaries of computer programming through titles like the CD-ROM series Living Books. Living Books would see an ongoing release of new titles and would continue to have respective sales. The first quarter of 1995 saw Broderbund mark an initial contribution of $1.7 million in nonoperating income from its 50 percent interest in Living Books. In January 1995, Rambabu (Bobby) Yarlagadda was appointed to the position of vice president and chief financial officer. Since its debut four years prior, Mercer Mayer's "Just Grandma and Me" had sold over 400,000 copies. During the fiscal 1995 year, Living Books grew approximately 50% primarily due to expansion of product lines and contributed 13% to Broderbund's fiscal 1995 revenue, more than Carmen Sandiego. Living Books became profitable and continued to expand. December 1996 saw Living Books' Green Eggs and Ham the 6th best-selling in the Home Education (MS-DOS/Windows) category, while Dr. Seuss’ ABC/Green Eggs and Ham was the 8th best-selling in the Home Education (Macintosh) category.

From October 1996 to January 30, 1997, a promotional campaign was run in French magazine SVM where readers could collect a Broderbund-Living Books loyalty card by finding all the products from the Broderbund and Living Books ranges and win numerous prizes, including a demo CD-ROM to Myst or two educational titles. Living Books was No. 2 with 12% of market share for educational CD-ROMs in December 1996, behind Disney's 13.2%. Each game cost "hundreds of thousands of dollars" to produce; budgets ranged from $500,000–$1 million. Producer Philo Northrup noted that creating Green Eggs and Ham was "very expensive". The credits to Dr. Seuss's ABC lists over 100 names, including additional departments like musicians and choreographers. In 1997, Living Books had a Green Eggs and Hamulator Scavenger Hunt on their website, with 36 parts scattered across the Internet; the winners were awarded prizes. The company would grow to 100 people and produced a total of 20 titles. Trouble was brewing; from 1994 to 1995 Living Books' competition limited retail display space and drove down "family entertainment" product prices by more than 11 percent.

==== Finding source material ====
At the time, there was a "trend toward familiar characters". Jason Lippe, general manager at multimedia educational store Learningsmith, opined that newer educational programs were more successful in capturing children's interest because they were based upon characters the children already know. Publishers often sought stories from popular culture like film and TV. In contrast, Living Books primarily sourced material from classic literature including traditional tales like The Tortoise and the Hare, and enduring children's picture books from well-known authors such as Dr. Seuss's Green Eggs and Ham. The Cat in the Hat was released on the 40th anniversary year of the original book's publication. On May 24, 1994, Living Books acquired worldwide media rights to Berenstain Bears' First Time Books series from authors Stan and Jan Berenstain; the book rights were owned by Random House. Living Books sought to secure the rights to stories that had already seen "success and acceptance" among teachers, parents, and publishers. Stories like those of Mercer Mayer had been "well received" by children, leading to Living Books' interest in adapting them. Living Books material touched upon ideas familiar to children, such as in The Berenstain Bears Get in a Fight, where two kids squabble and their parents try to deal with the problem. Animation World Network named Living Books as a series from the 1996–7 season that "hope[d] to cash in on the success of existing animated properties", alongside Fox Interactive's Anastasia: Adventures with Pooka and Bartok and THQ's PlayStation action game, Ghost in the Shell. Originally, Mark Schlicting was going to make a Noddy book instead of this one, but he loved the Arthur story so much that he decided to stick with the latter.

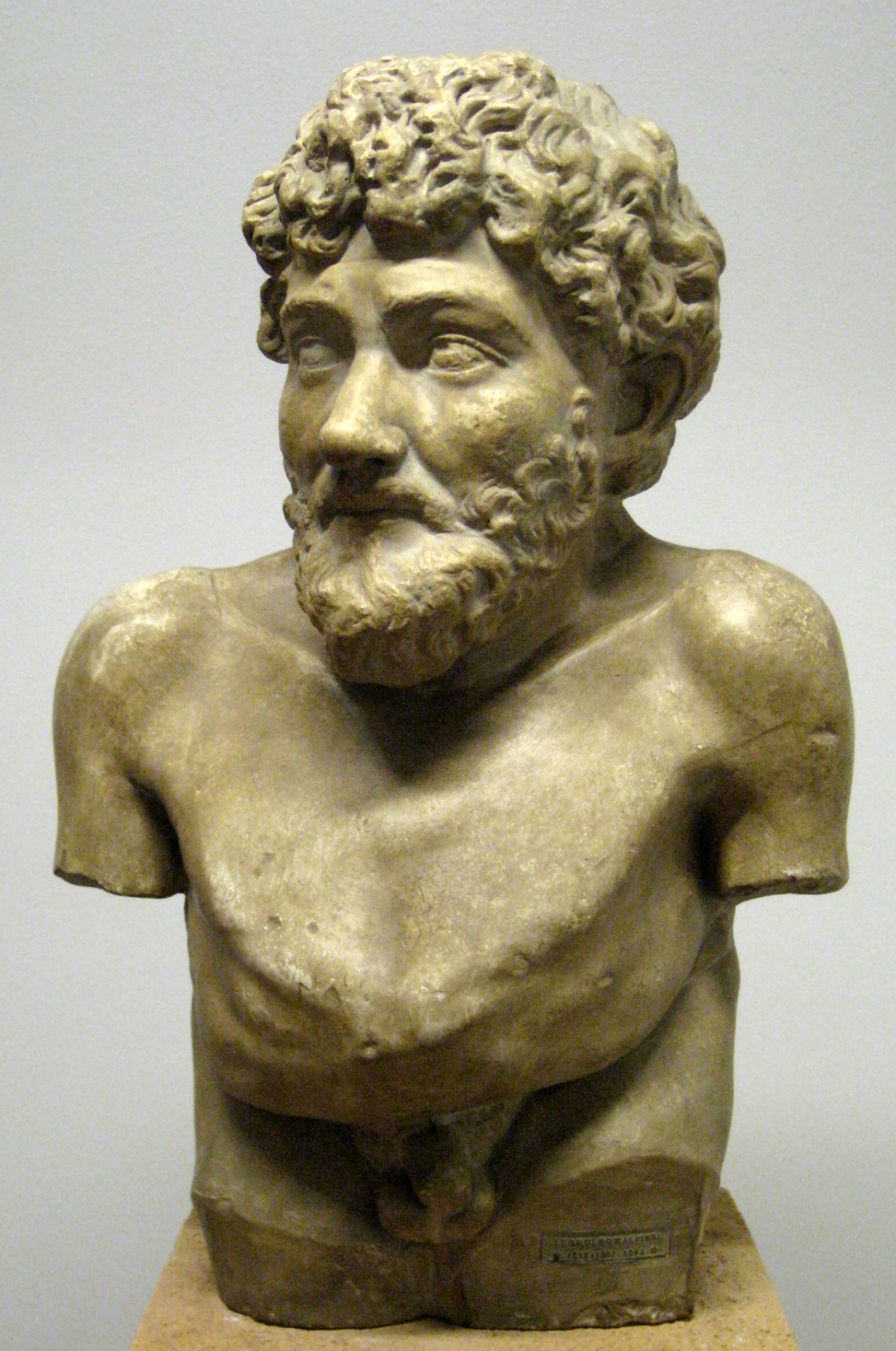
Living Books sourced most of their material from popular children's books, though they also adapted the classic Aesop's (pictured) fable The Tortoise and the Hare.

While most titles were based on popular franchises, two were brand new. The first original Living Books game that was not based on any existing books featured a modernized edition of Aesop's Tortoise and the Hare fable focusing on the 'slow and steady wins the race' moral; this story was retold by Schlichting and illustrated by Michael Dashow & Barbara Lawrence-Webster. Ruff's Bone was second original Living Books story, born from a collaboration between Broderbund and (Colossal) Pictures' New Media Division. It was co-produced by (Colossal) Pictures and written by (Colossal) Pictures head Eli Noyes; featuring a dog in search of his bone, the story was creative directed by Noyes. It was the first CD-ROM produced for Living Books by an external company. Noyes was inspired by Just Grandma and Me upon its 1992 release, having realised that CD-ROM was the "perfect modern-day medium for all my previous experience creating children's projects". Contrary to paper publishing projects, the team learnt that interactive storytelling relies more on collaboration like in film production, and appreciated the democratic decision-making culture. In September 1994, Living Books previewed Ruff's Bone at COMDEX. (Colossal) Pictures would lay off one-third of its staff in 1996; Wild Brain, which largely consisted of ex-employees from (Colossal) Pictures, would be contracted by Living Books to work on Green Eggs and Ham.

Meanwhile, the third original story Harry and the Haunted House, was written by Schlichting himself. Convinced that his concept for electronic books would work, he had written the story in 1988 specifically for the computer but never published it in paper form until the Living Books version was released. Schlichting said, "when I first wrote Harry and the Haunted House, I wanted to allow kids to go inside the pages of the storybook and play along with Harry and his friends as they overcome their imaginations while exploring the old house". In 1994, The Peep Show creator Kaj Pindal met with Schon regarding the characters and films in the Peep franchise (which began with the 1962 short film The Peep Show) to be adapted to the CD-ROM format, eventually securing a publisher's contract, with advance payment against royalties. Pindal began to work with Derek Lamb to create a prototype in the summer of 1996, though the project would eventually be cancelled.

==== Adaptation ====
The development team were committed to, as often as possible, working closely with each author to ensure a faithful rendering of the original story and its intent. These interactive storybooks were complete, animated renditions as opposed to the "highly edited and abridged versions" from other companies. Computer Museum Guide comments, "it's no coincidence that the books and the corresponding software are both popular". The use of a popular character like Arthur gave Arthur's Computer Adventure "significant shelf and package appeal to kids". The Living Books page illustrations generally replicated those from the book. However, Stellaluna, a story by Janell Cannon about a young fruit bat who becomes separated from her mother, varied from the source material through its language, visual perspectives, images, and animations which affected the orientation, social distance, and tone of the experience. Reframing research and literacy pedagogy relating to CD narratives writes that when a character queries Stellaluna's unusual behaviours, they gaze directly at the reader and demand an interpersonal engagement of the reader, as opposed to the book version where the character's gaze is directed at Stellaluna as an offer and the reader looks on with interpersonal detachment. Living Books' narrated, highlighted, and clickable text is identical to that of the book, though the characters sometimes have "conversational asides". Stellaluna contains 21 additional lines of text, however Cannon's version has just fifteen pieces of spoken or thought-out dialogue for Stellaluna.

Schlichting said "our relationship with the authors of the original books was that we would be taking their babies, their stories, their characters, and bring them over into animated media for the first time". Arthur had never had an animated voice before. (Living Books' 1992 release Arthur's Teacher Trouble predated the popular TV series by four years). Just Grandma and Me was the first digital outing for Mercer Mayer. Schlichting asserts that he was the first designer to digital life the works of Dr. Seuss, Marc Brown, Stan and Jan Beranstain, Mercer Meyer, and Jack Prelutsky. That said, Living Books' titles The Berenstain Bears Get in a Fight (1995) and The Berenstain Bears in the Dark (1996) were preceded by several Berenstain Bears titles released by Compton New Media.

Schlicting observed that Living Books often had a "profound effect" on their original authors; upon seeing Arthur's Teacher Trouble, Marc Brown said it "change[d] the way he thinks about books", and from then on he wrote books with animation and interaction in mind. Kevin Henkes, creator of Sheila Rae, the Brave, said, "for someone who doesn't own a computer, having one of my stories on CD-ROM is amazing...I realize that developing children's software is very different from telling a story in a traditional book format, and I appreciate Living Books' commitment to quality and deep concern for its audience". Stan Berenstain, co-creator of The Berenstain Bears, said of their digital adaption, "the team from Living Books understands how important humor and great visuals are in communicating information to children". After spending months on a prototype for New Kid on the Block, Schlicting presented the interactive version to the book author Jack Prelutsky; afterwards he turned to Schlicting and exclaimed, "Will you marry me?". Geisel expressed initial concerns about the quality and wanted Dr. Seuss adaptions to be "absolutely line-proof to the books", though he relented that her husband would be "enchanted" by the "interactive personal creative possibilities" that the new form of communication offered, and was supportive of the "hidden learning process". Of Green Eggs and Ham, she commented, "I am delighted, as I know Ted would be, with the conversion of his most popular book onto CD-ROM by Living Books". Just Grandma and Me was Mercer's first attempt at marrying the printed book and the computer into an educational and entertaining experience for children; of the program's success he said, "It was kind of a surprise".

==== Disability ====
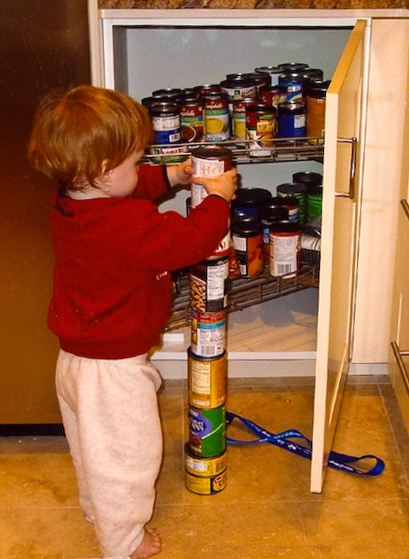
The Living Books series became especially popular with autistic children.

In response to a call by Alliance for Technology Access (ATA) for software companies to design products that were accessible to users with disabilities, Living Books stated their commitment to addressing accessibility issues by designing interactive, animated storybooks for all children, regardless of their ability levels in order to "broaden its scope of access". Living Books collaborated with Alliance in the design process, inviting them to test Broderbund's software with various assistive devices including screen enlargement programs, such as inLarge, and alternative keyboard access programs, such as IntelliKeys. Closed-captioned CD-ROMs were virtually non-existent by 1996 and there wasn't an organized effort to encourage multimedia companies to provide subtitles for plot-intensive products; Living Books mostly circumvented this by displaying the story text on screen.

23 products including Living Books titles went through the Alliance testing process, and Alliance created a list of Broderbund products that could be accessed with each device. This resulted in the incorporation of the ability to enlarge the standard size of print and graphics, the option of using voice commands instead of keystrokes or a mouse, thereby assisting users to access the 'read aloud' mode and the settings options. In 1995, the ATA released a short promotional video, Quality of Life: Alliance for Technology Access; production costs were underwritten by IBM's Special Needs Systems with help from past ATA supporters including Broderbund and Living Books.

Ray worked with companies that adapted the products for use on special keyboards designed for children who had problems using a standard mouse to interact with the stories (cerebral palsy, muscular dystrophy, autism, learning delays). Living Books became "especially popular with autistic children". In January 1997, Living Books donated four pieces of software to The Children's Trust after attending a Children's Head Injury Trust awareness week and learning that the Trust had donated a Compaq Presario computer; children with limited abilities played the program via a tracking system produced by Scope's Microtechnology Services. This move was praised by the facility's cognitive remediation and recreational/rehabilitation departments.

==== Little Ark Interactive ====
In 1996, Broderbund created the division Little Ark Interactive as a Living Books imprint. The project was at the direction of Doug Carlston, co-founder and CEO of Broderbund, whose father had been a priest. The joint venture's new division was created to develop and sell children's titles based on the Old Testament, a niche market with competitors like Compton's New Media product Children's Bible Stories. Little Ark Interactive then sought out Red Rubber Ball, the multimedia division of Atlanta-based Christian television and interactive music video producer The Nicholas Frank Company, to develop the titles. In December 1996, Red Rubber Ball, signed a licensing agreement with Living Books to develop CD-ROM titles under Red Rubber Ball's children's label Little Works to be published under Living Books' new Little Ark Interactive imprint; Red Rubber Ball completed writing, art, and advisory board duties while Living Books with special effects, programming, and marketing. Little Works' The Story of Creation and Little Works' Daniel in the Lion's Den, adapted biblical-themed Old Testament stories through "art, music and characterizations", were developed under the direction of members of the original Living Books team. Cel animation was completed by J. Dyer Animation and Design EFX respectively. The scripts for the two stories were written by children's author Ruth Tiller while musician Marc Aramian created compositions for the titles. The two stories were released on January 28, 1997, as the first of a planned series of five or six religious titles to be completed throughout 1997. To ensure they reached the broadest possible audience, the CD-ROM titles were screened by a multi-denominational panel of religious experts that included a rabbi, two pastors and a theologian. Little Ark Interactive anticipated a huge market as the Bible was still a best-seller in the United States centuries after its first publication, and as people of Jewish, Christian and Islamic faith all looked to the Old Testament. Little Ark also aimed to tap into nonreligious and non-denominational families who wanted to teach their children about the Bible.

=== Trouble (1996–1997) ===
==== Market saturation ====
Living Books began to face growing competition from Disney Interactive (Disney's Animated Storybook) and Microsoft in the animated storybook genre. These companies flooded retail outlets with low-cost titles, reducing the market value from $60–70 to $30–40 off an $8 cost, making it difficult to complete at the same price point. Living Books' sales dropped while costs increased. Little Ark Interactive products entered the market at around $20. Living Books became pressured to produce games at a faster pace while retaining their superior level of quality. This continued into fiscal year 1997, where the market for CD-ROM children's interactive storybooks continued to be "intensely competitive", which resulted in average selling prices being pushed down; Living Books had competitors with access to proprietary intellectual property content, and the financial resources to leverage branded media through film and TV. Media companies began leaving the multimedia business or downsized; GTE Entertainment announced it would shut down in March 1997, while Disney Interactive, Philips Interactive, and Viacom NewMedia cut jobs and even entire divisions to save money. Publishing houses that had previous entered the multimedia business were forced to downsizing their operations or exit the industry entirely.

The state of the CD-ROM industry was often put down to "inflated prices, mediocre titles, incompatibilities and bugs". However, Salon wrote that the financial struggle of even a reputable company like Living Books demonstrated that the "current woes of the multimedia b[usiness]" couldn't be "blamed simply on bad products". Schon suggested that despite the children's software segment of the interactive multimedia industry growing by 18 percent in 1996, with total revenues near $500 million, there were too many publishers to share the target market, and too many products fighting for the "very limited shelf space". In the first two quarters of 1996, Broderbund's product line including the Living Books series amounted to 9 percent of the market share. That September, The Daily News asserted that the Living Books series was "currently not making money". Even more concerning for the company, "the rapid growth of the Internet presented a profound disruption of Living Books basic production model" as there was a growing belief that content on the internet should be free. The emergence of the World Wide Web had diverted investment capital and development talent from the CD-ROM industry and broken its hold on consumers. In 1996, Living Books explored partnerships with Internet companies such as Netscape, and proposed a Netscape/Living Books collaboration called Netpal. Schon expressed hesitance with exploring web-based titles as the narrow available bandwidth would have given children a "slow, dull experience"; he was also uncertain what the business model would be in this new market. By April 1997 a brand new release from Living Books could be purchased for as little as $19.95 with coupons. Publishers struggled to find the right price point that would entice parents while allowing them to break even.

SoftKey (later known as The Learning Company) had a significant impact on the market. Throughout the 1990s they had a strategy of releasing shovelware discs of freeware or shareware at very low prices, purchasing edutainment companies through hostile takeovers and reducing them to skeleton staff, while retaining only a small development team to keep cranking out new products; by 1998 Broderbund was one of the few independent companies still standing. FundingUniverse explained, "with the elimination of elaborate packaging and hard-copy documentation, and the move to jewel-case formats with CD-sized booklets". SoftKey CEO Kevin O'Leary pioneered a budget line of CD-ROM products in 1995, with the company's "Platinum" line titles carrying retail list prices of $12.99 instead of the mid-$30 range most of the premiere products carried." In a direct action against Broderbund, SoftKey bought the company that made PrintMaster, a rival to Broderbund's best-seller The Print Shop, and sold it for $29.95 with a $30 refund which Broderbund couldn't compete with. This had a big effect on the company's stock price. Broderbund began to have a defensive strategy of preventing the remaining edutainment companies from being acquired by The Learning Company, a factor that would lead them into re-acquiring Living Books.

==== Return to Broderbund ====

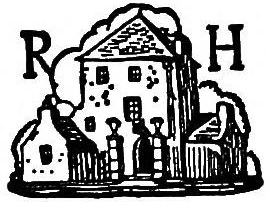
In 1994, Broderbund and Random House created Living Books as a joint venture. Three years later, a troubled market led to Random House selling back its 50% share, leading to the company being acquired by Broderbund

This climate affected the profit projections of Living Books. In 1996–7, Broderbund enlisted Jeff Charvat to work on the troubled series and making it work; Charvat "charg[ed] in with answers, rather than questions", a strategy Charvat later admitted "[wa]sn't the way to go". With mounting losses, Random House started trying to sell its shares and began negotiating with Broderbund. On January 17, 1997, it was reported that Broderbund and Random House had "reached preliminary agreement on key terms" to transition Random House's stake in the 50–50 joint venture to Broderbund in a buy back, though it would need to be approved by each company's Boards of Directors; Random House would continue to be a content partner for future Living Books products. Under the new arrangement, Random House would continue to sell Living Books via their bookstore channels, help Broderbund acquire content licences for future titles, while royalties would be determined on a case-by-case basis.

At the time, Joe Durrett, chief executive officer of Broderbund noted, "although Living Books remains a small portion of Broderbund's revenue, it shares our focus on children's education and will continue to play a central role in educational software development." Randi Benton, president of Random House New Media, felt that integrating Living Books into Broderbund would allow it to better take advantage of the company's sales and marketing. Random House was to receive an undisclosed amount of cash and Broderbund stock. The agreement was signed on January 20, 1997, and Broderbund hinted at a management reshuffle. At this point it was unsure whether Living Books would be folded into Broderbund or remain a separate entity.

This was not uncommon at the time for book publishers to revise their multimedia strategies. Random House would also sell its minority stakes in Humongous Entertainment and Knowledge Adventure, while HarperColllins sold off both its adult and children's operations; meanwhile, Simon & Schuster "readjusted" by cutting staff and cancelling titles. Publishers Weekly attributed their market failure to bookstores, their traditional distribution channels, being hesitant to embrace new media, leading to the book publishers having to fight for shelf space in alternate outlets against established new media players.

Random House ultimately sold its shares in Living Books back to Broderbund for $9.3 million (through a combination of cash and restricted stock with an aggregate purchase price of approximately $18,370,000). The Living Books excess purchase price was allocated to in-process technology and charged to Broderbund's operations account at the time of acquisition. As a result, the group became acquired as a wholly owned by Broderbund who subsequently folded the division.

By April 1997, Living Books had reduced the number of titles it released per year, adopted a culture of parsimoniousness, and relied on its "high-quality back-list of classics" to "generate steady income". Schon anticipated a "shakeout". In October 1997, Living Books halted half its projects and underwent a staff restructuring of which more than half its workforce including Shon were laid off. The layoffs came after consecutive quarterly losses at Living Books.

Broderbund's education line of products, which included Living Books, decreased approximately 8% in fiscal 1997 as compared to a 13% increase in fiscal 1996. Broderbund, which had purchased both Parsons Technology and Living Books over fiscal year 1997, saw its shares reduce by 9.8 percent after reporting a second-quarter multimillion-dollar loss. Channelweb commented that Broderbund had "burnt its fingers" with Living Books, which had "turned in a lacklustre performance". Broderbund explained Living Books' decline in unit sales and net revenues over fiscal 1996 and fiscal 1997 as "an increase in operating expenses reflecting higher marketing and development costs" and "pricing pressure".

=== Decline (1997–2000) ===
==== Later activities ====
August 27, 1996 saw the company release an interactive website at www.livingbooks.com called Living Books' Corner of the Universe; Tortoise from "The Tortoise and the Hare" guided visitors through three planets: the Kids' Planet, the Grown-Ups' Planet and the Corporate Planet. Narrative Communications, Enliven streaming technology was used to allow demos to be played over the internet. In 1997, Broderbund bundled Living Books titles in groups of four and re-released them as Living Books Libraries and a competitive price point of $30. They contained "a special bilingual component that includes Spanish versions of selected student reproducible pages and a discussion of the special needs of second language learners", as well as a Living Books Alive video demonstrating the practicable application within the classroom. Broderbund also released two compilations of the stories under the line "Three for Me Library". The first volume contained Sheila Rae, the Brave, Just Grandma and Me, and Little Monster at School, while the second volume contained The Berenstain Bears Get in a Fight, Tortoise and the Hare, and Harry and the Haunted House. In 1997, Broderbund also re-issued Just Grandma and Me and Arthur's Birthday as Version 2.0 with increased resolution and additional minigames. Just Grandma and Me 2.0 also featured a Castilian Spanish dub as opposed to the Latin Spanish dub of the 1.0 release. Arthur's Computer Adventure was released on August 3, 1998, as the first in a "new evolution" of Living Books which "fully incorporate[d] storybook and activity center elements". By 1998, Broderbund had sold 10 million copies of this series worldwide and had achieved over 60 awards. That year, Living Books developed and published its last titles, which were based on the Arthur children's book series.

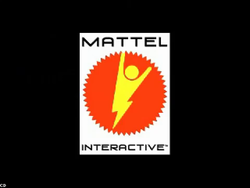
At the turn of the millennium, Living Books passed through many corporate hands in the span of a few years: The Learning Company (1998), Mattel Interactive (1999), The Gores Group (2000), and Riverdeep (2001). Through mergers and acquisitions, Riverdeep would evolve into current rights holders Houghton Mifflin Harcourt.

In February 1998, Broderbund offered ICTV, provider of high-speed internet services and interactive multimedia content over cable television networks, selections from a suite of educational and entertainment interactive CD-ROM titles including Living Books. After two years of negotiation, in August 1998 Brazilian publisher Editora Delta secured a contract to translate the series of 18 books into Brazilian-Portuguese (as "Livros Vivos"); the company had previously been known as producer of the encyclopaedia "Koogan Houaiss" and the Mundo da Criança collection. Founded in 1930, Delta entered the multimedia industry in the 1990s with the importation of foreign CD-ROMS; product localisation was necessary for these titles to be successful, and as such Delta employed a translation process that adapted the content, localising references, lip syncing the mouths, and altering the story text and animation. This phase of the company was launched with the volumes of the "Livros Vivos" collection for the child consumer: "Só Vovó e Eu", "Ursinhos Brigões", "Aniversário do Artur" and "Stellaluna", worked on from 1994 to 1996. Delta secured Sítio do Pica-Pau Amarelo actress Zilka Sallaberry to narrate the stories. The CD for O Aniversário de Arthur (Arthur's Birthday) was released with the Spanish and English language options. In March 1999, Delta would announce the release of Stellaluna. By 2002, The Tortoise and the Hare was selling for $9.98 at Children's Software Online.

==== The Learning Company et al. sale ====
On August 31, 1998, Broderbund was bought in a hostile takeover by The Learning Company, in a stock deal of $416 million, following many other child-focused companies that were absorbed throughout the decade. The company had been formerly known as SoftKey until it acquired The Learning Company in 1995 and took its name. Broderbund became the 14th Learning Co. acquisition since 1994, and secured the company 40% of the educational gaming market. The Learning Company was known for aggressively driving down the development costs of products and laying off employees of the companies it acquired. Broderbund's 1700 employees were reduced a year later to around 30.

While the Broderbund brand lived on, the company was disbanded and the talent found new opportunities. Meanwhile, "the rights to Living Books [and other Broderbund brands] began to bounce from corporate owner to corporate owner. The Learning Company re-released some Living Books titles. In 1998, D.W. the Picky Eater was upgraded as Arthur's Adventures With D.W. with a new menu system. and additional games. Dr Seuss' ABC appeared in the collection Adventure Workshop: Preschool-1st Grade, and Tots. In 1998-9, Living Books launched the series into German. In 1999, The Learning Company released a reworked version of Arthur's Reading Race as Arthur's Reading Games (1997) under their Creative Wonders label, which brought the reading games to the forefront and moved the interactive story to a bonus feature.

On May 13, 1999, The Learning Company themselves were bought by Mattel for $3.8 billion, a company with limited experience with developing software titles. The acquisition was part of CEO Jill Barad's strategy to expand Mattel into electronic toys and video games. The Learning Company and the Broderbund brand names were brought under the Mattel Interactive umbrella. In their 1999 Annual report, Mattel noted an "incomplete technology writeoff of $20.3 million related to products" being developed by Creative Wonders, Parsons Technology, and Living Books. In response to public complaints about privacy, Mattel Interactive announced that starting June 2000 they would provide a tool that removes Mattel software called Broadcast which was surreptitiously being placed inside Living Books and other programs to transmit and receive information to Mattel. Broadcast had been named after Broderbund, who had designed the original software as a marketing technique. However the software ended up discontinued in April when the federal Children's Online Privacy Protection Act went into effect. That same month, Mattel Interactive was put up for sale.

Mattel ended up selling The Learning Company to acquisition and management company The Gores Group for a fraction of the price they had originally paid for them. Mattel's acquisition of The Learning Company has been referred to as "one of the worst acquisitions of all time" by several prominent business journals. After taking over The Learning Company, Gores divided it into three groups one of which focused on educational software and included the Living Books brand name; Riverdeep purchased this group in September 2001. Through Riverdeep mergers and acquisitions, the rights "eventually landed with publisher Houghton Mifflin Harcourt". According to Schlichting, Broderbund's turbulent corporate history meant that "many great CD-ROM titles for kids were forgotten while technology and operating systems moved forward." Schlichting asserts that, "for years, former team members and fans wished there was a way" to resurrect the series and that "several of us looked into it". While the series had experienced a "decade of great success", Houghton Mifflin Harcourt would not release new Living Books stories, and the series "languished without updates to newer operating systems for PC and Macs". The series however was still well-remembered; for instance in 2007, The Open University of Israel wrote a journal article entitled Living Books: The Incidental Bonus of Playing with Multimedia, finding that "young children who did not know how to speak or read the English language became proficient in pronunciation and gained a high level of understanding by playing with Living Books".

=== Wanderful reboot (2010–2012) ===
==== Reboot conception ====
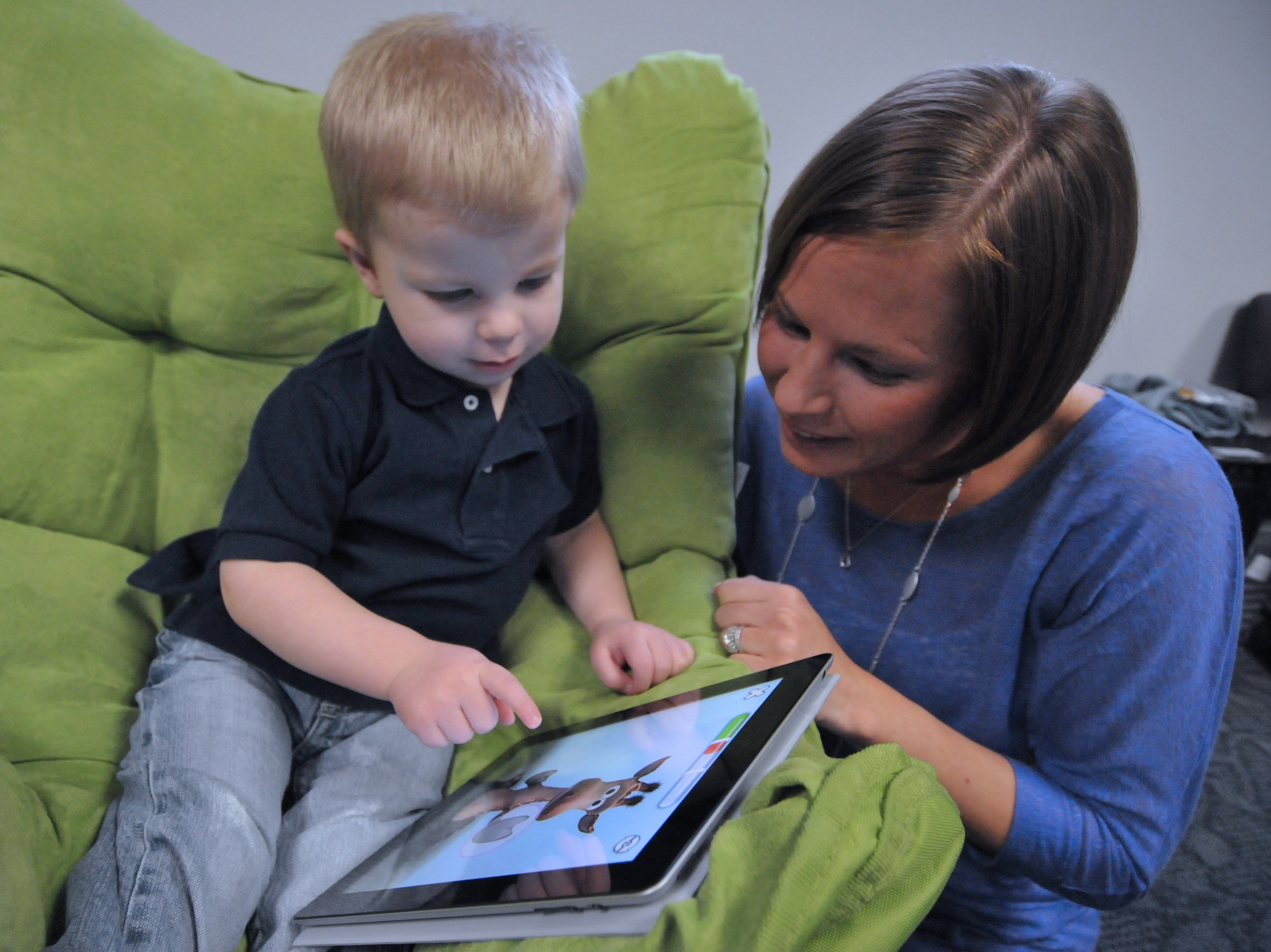
Schon was inspired to revive the Living Books series in 2010 after observing the capabilities of the recently released iPad.

After the CD-ROM market's decline in 1997, Schlichting left to oversee creative development for an early online children's network called JuniorNet. In 2000, he founded NoodleWorks Interactive, a creative company specializing in children's interactive design, development, and social networking; his first iPad app for children, Noodle Words – Actions, was released November 2011 and won numerous awards. In 2010 he presented at the Dust or Magic AppCamp as part of the "Panel of Legends"; he would continue to present at these conferences over several years. Meanwhile, Mantle left to work for Gracenote, a company which provided music information services to Apple. By 2010, Mantle had accumulated a series of ex-Broderbund staff at Mantle, and upon the announcement of the iPad, he felt it was the perfect platform to bring Living Books back. The animation, graphics, sound, and music would be unchanged, and only product platform would be different.

Mantle identified that there were currently no products on the market that were designed for children with autism, which had been a key demographic of Living Books. He enlisted Axworthy as Senior Systems Architect to create a prototype using the series' existing assets which could run on the new technology. Meanwhile, he contacted Baker to help deduce who the Living Books CD-ROM asset rights belonged to and how best to license them. The pair worked out that the rights were owned by Houghton Mifflin Harcourt. By early 2011 a prototype was running. Mantle informed Schlichting that he was "getting the band back together", and Schlichting offered a list of "requirements and suggestions for enhancing the products" after reviewing the prototype. Schlichting was ultimately brought onto the project as Chief Creative Officer, as was Siegel who resumed his role. Ray was brought back to update the materials for classroom teachers that she developed initially for Living Books. Upon being asked to return, graphic technician Rob Bell was "thankful" that Mantle had the "resources and means and motivation" to do this project, which he saw as "bringing these products back to life".

Mantle reached out to Houghton Mifflin Harcourt, and succeeded in acquiring the Living Books CD-ROM rights and assets from John Bartlett the VP, Licensing Consumer Products and Solutions, who used to work at The Learning Company and knew the series. By late 2011, Mantle had successfully secured the exclusive rights to all the Living Books storybook assets from HMH, and began active development. However, Houghton Mifflin Harcourt had allowed the Living Books content to be re-published so long as the Living Books name remained theirs. As Houghton Mifflin now owned the 'Living Books' brand, a new name was needed. The team decided to create a new moniker while including an attribution that the stories were “originally published as a Living Book by Broderbund Software” with the Living Books logo. After being presented with 30 potential names by Anthony Shore, Chief Operative of branding agency Operative Words at a preliminary screening, Wanderful Interactive Storybooks was chosen. The new name is related to "wonderful" and "wandering", with the games "about being inside storybooks, exploring, and the magic of it all". Wanderful describes the books' "full[ness] of joy", the "invitation to explore" the "free-form play" from their "expansive and non-linear interactivity", and their "whimsy and curiosity, delight and enrichment". Wanderful's aim was to "reinvent and reintroduce the Living Books titles for young and emerging readers (and their families) everywhere".

==== Reboot development ====
20 years after their release, the Living Books assets were extracted from customer CD-ROM copies, and arranged into the Wanderful app platform with improved interactivity.

The team had a significant hurdle to overcome in the next stage of development. While they had secured the Houghton Mifflin Harcourt rights to Living Books, the assets were not readily available. Broderbund's documentation, scripts, source code, and product assets (graphics, animations, sound, and music files) had been saved onto a set of CD-ROMs and placed in the company's product archives. However, Broderbund's turbulent company history at the turn of the millennium led to much of this archive being lost. Therefore, Wanderful hired original Broderbund programmers to re-create modules from scratch. Meanwhile, master archives of assets were created by acquiring customer copies of original Living Books products to extract the files from the CD-ROMs. Axworthy identified not having the source code as the biggest challenge.

Once the assets were retrieved, the titles still required significant modifications in order to optimise their "interaction and responsiveness"; this involved reprogramming how user interactions would be interpreted as actions. As a result, page introductions and animated sequences were able to be interruptible, which was key to making the product work on tablets. Wanderful added settings to allow the parent or teacher to "modify the interactivity to customize the mode of operation" to be appropriate for the child, being able to choose between an 'interruptible' mode (where clicking triggers an action – useful for word recognition) and a 'patience mode' (where players must wait for the current action to complete – useful for children with ADHD) to suit different child learning styles. Interruptible mode offered language exploration opportunities by allowing children to play with the beginning sounds of each word in a "rapid fire"; e.g. "Baa-baa-baa-baby". This new option benefited users through self-paced interaction and repetition, and "the ability to click a particular word 30 times in a row is like having an infinitely patient, ever-available teacher or parent".

Meanwhile, no changes were made to the user interface or appearance. The upgrade was made more complex through the addition of a page navigation and language selection system, as well as synchronising the interruptible 2D animations with the audio sounds and music. Additionally, the animations and sounds had to be interruptible and able to be repeat rapidly if the user chose to frenetically interact with the system. All this complexity and the many components that implement these capabilities are rolled up into the User Interactivity and Action Interpreter boxes. The team managed the display of ancillary assets in HTML/JavaScript, while the graphics and layout was done using CSS templates this process added many months of effort to the schedule. This technology suited a "blended learning environment", combining "both face-to-face and distance learning".

The titles were presented through a dynamic language function that allows readers to switch languages whenever they want. Titles came with two languages (either US English and Spanish, or UK English and French, that the user could toggle through), and offered in-app purchases for additional languages. Wonderful announced in they 2012 that upcoming versions of the interactive storybooks would also be available in Japanese, German, Italian, U.K. English and Brazilian Portuguese.

Touching the upper right and left blue triangles reveals pop-up page navigation thumbnails, and pop-up language selection buttons respectively. There was also an option to show where the hotspots are. The titles included interactive features for multi-touch devices and refreshed art work for higher-resolution displays than was available at their original release. Players could buy the right to perpetual updates for $7.99.

Deluxe versions of the titles were made available for teachers with bonus features including the 30 page curriculum plan Teacher's Guides originally made for classrooms. Ray opted not to alter these much from the originals, which had been carefully constructed by a team of professionals, though the guides were cognisant of the current USA Common Core State Standards. These educator-focused Classroom Activities Guide were available for $2.99 as an in-app purchase, and tied each storybook to reading, arts, math, social studies and other subjects inspired by the narrative and adhering to Common Core State Standards. They also included printable pages of puppets, activity sheets, and images from the stories. Additional content was added in-game; for example Arthur's Teacher Trouble, a story focused around a 3rd grade Spelling Bee, was supplemented by three pages of interactive 3rd grade spelling words.

==== Reboot release and current era ====
Seven of the updated and enhanced storybooks were released on iOS throughout 2012, while Android and Mac OS versions were added from 2013. Wanderful's first four titles, released through 2012 at a price point of $4.99, were Arthur's Teacher Troubles (originally 1992), Little Monsters at School (originally 1993), The Tortoise and the Hare (originally 1993), and Harry and the Haunted House (originally 1994). Harry and the Haunted House was released in October to coincide with Halloween. November 2012 saw The Berenstain Bears Get in a Fight released as the fifth title (originally 1995). The New Kid on the Block was released October 29, 2013 as the ninth. The Mac version was released on April 11, 2013. Shlichting noted, "You're looking at a few dollars profit for an app instead of $30 for a CD game, and users expect more than they used to. To be a sustainable company, you have a higher bar for sales and quality." Living Books Samplers, standalone CD-ROMs which had been given away with the original Living Books for free in magazines or as built-in catalogs with the programs, were compiled and released as the Living Books Sampler free app with an interactive one-page sample of each title, and was updated as more storybook were re-released; Living Books Sampler was released on December 13, 2012, on iOS and April 25, 2013, for Mac OS X. The app is "hosted" by Simon, the narrator from Wanderful's classic version of the Aesop's fable Tortoise and the Hare. The app also includes Wanderful's Classroom Activities Overview and a Classroom Activities Preview for one of the storybooks, both as PDF documents. Living Books Sampler contained over 250 interactive elements.

Little Ark Interactive became a wholly owned subsidiary of Wanderful. Two titles from the affiliate were re-released in March 2014. The third, Noah's Ark, was released in 2016. They aimed to continue releasing titles under this banner " to help children discover a lasting love of language through story exploration and learn important lessons from the Bible." At the ISTE (International Society for Technology & Education) 2014 conference, Software MacKiev and Wanderful Interactive Storybooks announced the availability of Stellaluna for iPad/iPhone/iPod Touch and Mac OSX computers. Software MacKiev would release the iOS versions of four storybooks: Dr Seuss' ABC, Green Eggs and Ham, Stellaluna, and The Cat in the Hat, though Wanderful's Dr. Seuss titles would be removed from the App Store to prevent confusion over the similarly titled Oceanhouse Media apps. Oceanhouse Media would become the largest interactive books publisher on Amazon Fire TV by 2018, and had 62 titles including versions of the same titles that Living Books had adapted.

In March 2016, Schon donated to The Strong museum hundreds of materials that document the Living Books' history, including games and company records from between 1993 and 2000. Wanderful currently has 9 employees and has generated $1 million in sales. In 2020, Wanderful announced that their Classroom Activities Guides would be offered for free with their storybook apps to assist families during COVID-19 isolation. To date, the first Living Books title Just Grandma and Me has sold over 4 million copies in seven languages, while Harry and the Haunted House has sold over 300,000 copies in six languages. The Living Books series as a whole went on to sell tens of millions of copies in multiple languages. Living Books titles are currently available through Wanderful Interactive Storybooks' series of app re-releases on iOS. The Living Books rights are currently licensed from Houghton Mifflin Harcourt.

Wanderful Interactive was acquired by the Jordan Freeman Group in January 2023. On May 17, 2023, the acquisition was made official, along with Freeman's announcement of a partnership with Arthur creator, Marc Brown. All of the games except for the Dr. Seuss ones and Sheila Rae, The Brave are playable on Steam.

== Legacy ==
=== Contemporary opinions ===
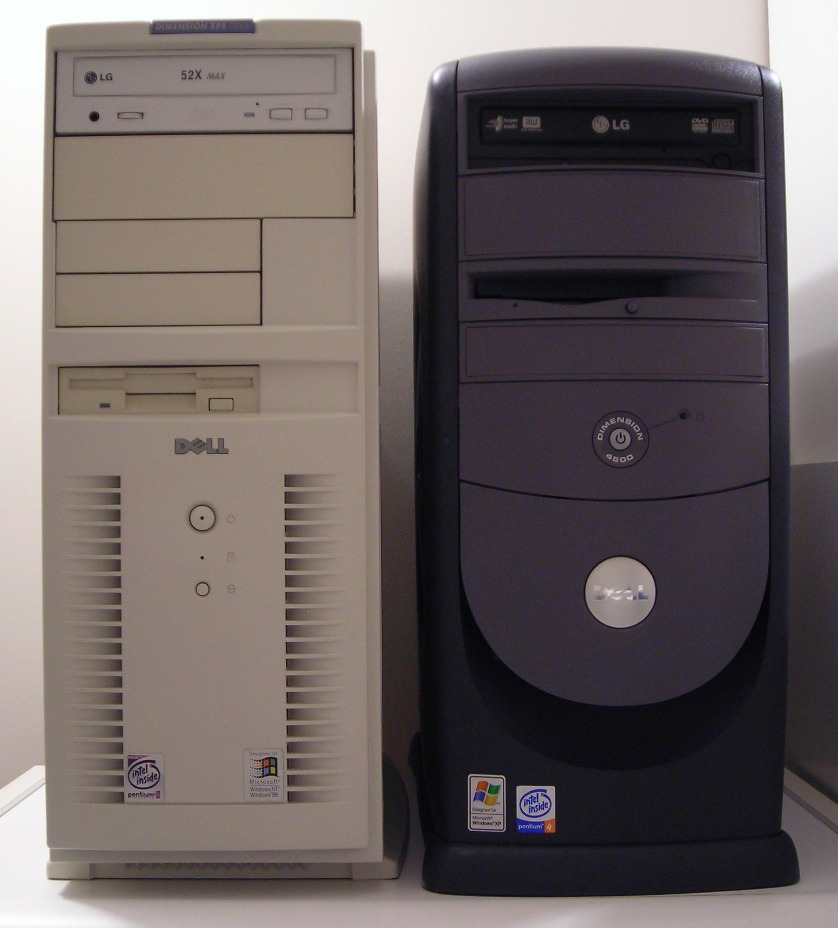
Compute! thought the series would drive customers to purchase CD-ROM players for their computers to run the software.

In August 1992, Kiplinger's Personal Finance wrote of the series, "there's not much demand for computer CD's yet, but I like that fact that Broderbund looks ahead". That month, Computer Gaming World wrote, the "notion of matching children's books to CD technology is nothing short of inspired" though noted the disk-access and data transfer limitations of CD-ROMs; nevertheless the magazine anticipated the series would "probably go down in history as the Carmen Sandiego of the talking book genre". Upon release, Wired wrote that Just Grandma and Me is the "closest thing to an instant classic' in the relatively new arena of children's CD-ROMs". Critics raved about it. Newsweek suggested that Schtiling could "end up serving as the Dr. Seuss of the digital age", as he had an "ear — and respect — for the tastes of kids". According to Publishers Weekly, the Living Books company was formed in 1994 "amid a great deal of fanfare".

For Michael J. Himowitz at Tampa Bay Times, the series brought back the "old 'Gee whiz" reaction that he had lost over his decade spent playing and reviewing computer games. Compute! asserted in 1993 that the introduction of the Living Books series saw Broderbund "adding yet more extraordinary titles to an already superior product line". The New York Times felt the "post-modern" series "turns traditional beginning-to-end narrative on its head". Compute! wrote that users would be "enthralled by this new style of storytelling". Newsweek thought that Living Books demonstrated Broderbund was "one of the first companies to experiment with CD-ROMs". The Age felt the series "gave children's stories a whole new life", and "caused both teachers and parents to reflect on the value of such a format for books"; it felt that the series continued output and sales was testament to the view that the majority of customers believe they have something to offer to young readers.

Compute! wrote that Living Books "demonstrates the power of multimedia computing" through this "perfect babysitter", ultimately praised Broderbund's "virtuoso performance" in "taking the lead in advancing the state of the art of educational multimedia software". Newsweek dubbed Schlichting as the "reigning muse in the business of converting children's lit into interactive CD-ROM discs [that] kids squeal over". At Disney, Living Books were considered "exemplars of how best to create engaging, enriching, digital story experiences for children". The Washington Post deemed it "the best of the book-bound-read-along genre ". Just Grandma and Me, the first in the series, was deemed by The New York Times as the "standard-bearer of the Living Books line", which they described as a "kind of multimedia industry gold standard". Compute! wrote "These Living Books delight at so many levels they'll make you want to buy a CD-ROM player if you don't already have one for your home computer". Computer Gaming World wrote that Living Books' quality is "unmatched" and comes with the highest recommendation, and felt the "acclaimed series" should be "at the very top of any parent's list". In 1995, St Louis Post-Dispatch wrote, "almost any kid with a home computer and a CD-ROM has heard of Living Books". Anne L. Tucker of CD-ROM Today revealed "I'm addicted to Living Books", and wished all her favourite childhood stories could be adaption by the series. PC Magazine wrote that Arthur's Teacher Trouble as well as Just Grandma and Me are "among the best-ever CD-ROMs".

Emergency Librarian wrote the series upheld the high standards of Broderbund. TES thought the series owned the interactive storybook genre. In 1996, The Educational Technology Handbook wrote that Living Books was "running away with awards". Inside Education thought the series was "setting a standard for excellence in the children's software industry". By 1997 there were at least eight manufacturers of CD-ROM interactive storybooks. Salon described Living Books as "one of the hot companies of the early-'90s electronic publishing boom". The Seattle Times asserted that Living Books "popularized the animated storybook format". Strategy+Business deemed the series part of Broderbund's "string of winners" including Print Shop, Where in the World Is Carmen Sandiego?, Kid Pix and Myst. In 1999, Interaktive Geschichten für Kinder und Jugendliche auf CD-ROM noted Broderbund was "one of the first companies to convert books into multimedia form". Schlichting's child-informed design is a technique which by 1999 would become ubiquitous in both the industry and academia almost a decade after its use by Living Books. Living Books were the first to use both "read to me" and "let me play" modes, as well as speech-driven highlighting; both techniques have since been widely adapted in children's language app design. Children's Tech Review featured an interview with Schlichting in their March/April 1999 issue entitled A Conversation with Mark Schlichting: The Guy Who Thought Up the Living Books; in it the newspaper opined, "if someone asked you to name the best children's software ever made, Living Books would surely make the list". Massenmedium Computer reflected in 1999 that the 'virtual pop-ups' received "surprisingly good" reviews despite Living Books' short history and the series' "artistically unappealing design".

=== Modern opinions ===
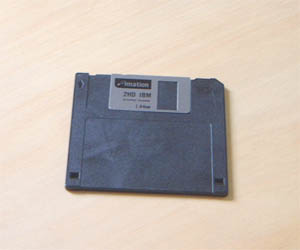
Living Books overcame software rot, where older software is unplayable on modern hardware, through its Wanderful enhancement and re-release.

Living Books pre-empted the popularity of the industry; by 1995 the CD-ROM market had "exploded". Museum of Play wrote that Living Books was the "leader in this effort to upgrade juvenile literature for the digital age". Interactive stories for children and teenagers on CD-ROM agreed it was "one of the first companies to translate books into multimedia". Gamasutra designated it "the oldest CD ROM series for kids". Living Books became popular and encouraged other developers to follow suit and copy the formula. While teachers had already been buying copies of the game for their classrooms for years, the series would become one of the first pieces of software to be accredited as a 'textbook' in several states. However, when the program was first released in schools it had a "very mixed reception" Multiple Perspectives on Difficulties in Learning Literacy and Numeracy noted that teachers observed children crowding around the screen to play and screaming with laughter when triggering animations, and that children agreed they were not paying attention to the text.

The series won many awards and its creators received letters from children and parents. People became so enamoured by Living Books that the book authors were asked to autograph the CD-ROMs. Apple Inc.'s John Sculley even used the titles in product demonstrations. It was seen as the "multimedia de facto standard" by Microsoft, and was shown nationally and internationally by Bill Gates. The Huffington Post deemed the series the first example of ebooks, and the precursor to the eReader-tablet pairing that popularised digital reading. Children's Tech Reviews agreed that Living Books pre-empted ebooks by 15 years, deeming them "children's e-books". Living Books has frequently been used in research papers regarding child learning. In the years after the sale of Broderbund, Schlichting struggled to reach the levels of fame of his series as his name did not appear on the products themselves. However, in 2012, Schlichting was awarded the Kids at Play Interactive "KAPi" Award for 'Legend Pioneer' at the Consumer Electronics Show due to "inspiring a generation of younger designers" through Living Books and Noodle Words; the jurors commented, "it's about time this guy is recognized for his contribution to the field."

Hyper Nexus noted that Living Books' reputation of ease and functionality led to consumers testing other Broderbund programs and the company achieving a strong market domination, a phenomenon they had earlier observed with 1984's The Print Shop. In 2007, a presentation at the 12th Human-Computer Interaction International Conference asserted that there is a "cult that involves millions of 'Living Books Freaks', who use the titles for hours every day, both in groups and alone". French site Week-ends.be asserted that Living Books were "'masters-choices"' that are "unanimously appreciated by children." Jon-Paul C. Dyson, director of The Strong's International Center for the History of Electronic Games, said "Living Books was an innovator in the creation of interactive books and became a leader in the development of educational and entertaining software for young children". In his paper Multimedia Story-telling, Yoram Eshet deemed Living Books "one of the most powerful and widespread expressions of multimedia educational environments", and asserted that interactive storybooks are "one of the most common edutainment genres". According to Computer Gaming World, the Wanderful project addresses the "challenge of overcoming so-called software rot" in which computer programs become incompatible with modern hardware as contemporary systems become discontinued and upgraded.

Igotoffer wrote the series "perfected the art of creating kids’ storybooks on CD-ROM". Storybench described Schlichting as one of the forefathers of edutainment due to his work on Living Books. Dust Or Magic, Creative Work in the Digital Age thought Living Books was the sole exception in the CD-ROM publishing 'shovel-ware era'. Dust or Magic, a digital design-sharing platform inspired by the book and produced by produced by Children's Technology Review asserts that the early success of Club Penguin, Pokémon, Minecraft or Living Books "can be tied in part to their clever use of animation and humor, which aren't used randomly or without purpose"; it writes that Living Books "went on to become a standard-bearer of quality, loved by children, parents and teachers alike for their emphasis on good stories and entertaining exploration". Teachers With Apps wrote, "many in the industry to be the benchmark for engaging educational multimedia".

=== Creator opinions ===
Schlchting acknowledges that Living Books became a household name, but "only after a struggle". According to him, Living Books became the industry's first truly interactive storybooks and "defined the category". Schlichting asserts that the series' lack of install and its automatic play feature was revolutionary for the time. He noted that the "attract mode" was so popular that parents would write in to say that their kids had learnt all the moves and would dance along. Schlichting later learnt that his direct address technique was one of the methodologies of Montessori education, though he had added it because "it seemed right". Schlichting discovered that children with autistic or with special needs felt that their decisions "'made' the animation happen", and that they were able to map this feeling of control onto the real world. Schlichting's ex-coworker Jesse Scholl opined that he "knew so much about how children think and what they cared about". Mickey W. Mantle, president and CEO, Wanderful reflected ""Living Books has such an amazing legacy, remembered by children, trusted by parents and embraced by the educational community" through "elegant, interactive-rich...production values".

Over the years, Schlichting has had many people tell him that they learned English from Living Books. George Consagra, executive producer of Ruff's Bone, thought Living Books were "pioneers in the art of interactive storytelling". Prior to his work on Ruff's Bone, Noyes had been inspired by Just Grandma and Me, subsequently seeing CD-ROMs as the "perfect modern-day medium" for his children's projects. Angie Simas, who ran Broderbund's first website, came to the company as an interim job while seeking a teaching position, though after observing Living Books two weeks in she was inspired to change her career to the computing industry. Axworthy recalling his daughter not knowing about his software career, and one day gushing about a product she used at school, Sheila Rae, the Brave about two sisters who learn to love and depend on each other, not knowing it was worked on by her father. He recalled Schlichting as being difficult to work with, but appreciated the impact he had on children's lives. Mantle noted that Living Books were "pioneering apps on Macs of a generation ago over" and that over the years they'd "had many requests from Mac-using teachers and parents" to revive the programs. so he was "excited to make these great story experiences again available for the Mac". He said the project came "full circle"." In 2014, he noted "Wanderful Apps have been long been favorites of special needs children in the autistic community."

=== Relationship to other series ===
Broderbund's Living Books series was perhaps the first example of popular children's stories in print being adapted into digital storybooks that encouraged interactive learning and play in the computer, or at least popularized the animated storybook format through hits such as 1993's Just Grandma and Me and Arthur's Teacher Trouble which were based on popular children's books from the 1980s by Mercer Mayer and Marc Brown respectively. The Seattle Times asserted that the Living Books encouraged other developers to follow suit. Disney copied the formula through Disney Animated Storybook, whose interactive screens imitated Living Books' interactive pages. Both companies combined the authors' illustrations and stories with digital activities and were guided by a narrator—each screen began with a brief animation followed by a narrator describing the action; after the conclusion of each page, the scene became an "interactive mural with hot buttons" the player could click. Project LITT: Literacy Instruction Through Technology found that Living Books had high text interactivity and minimal extraneous games and activities, while Disney's Animated Storybook had medium text interactivity and embedded games and activities. New Media notes that "nothing sells like a character" that has already been proven in media, noting this strategy used by Disney creating spin-offs of its film and TV projects, and Living Books applying this to a lesser extent with popular books. Compute! suggested that the only negative to the series is its "hardware expectations" though noted it would "encourage people to upgrade their machines".

Disney's Animated Storybook and Living Books, which competed for market share throughout the 1990s, were frequently compared in the media.

Computer Shopper negatively compared activities in Living Books titles to those in Disney's Animated Storybook. Meanwhile, the Los Angeles Times criticized Disney for contracting their games to independent studios like Media Station, deeming the series "a mere imitation of Broderbund's Living Books format". The study Talking Storybook Programs for Students with Learning Disabilities found that "Living Books programs appeared more comprehensible to students than the Disney programs". MacUser felt Slater & Charlie Go Camping by Sierra On-Line was a "pale imitation" of the Living Books series, while PC Mag thought it wasn't "quite as richly animated" as Living Books. Additionally, MacUser wrote that series like Living Books and Discis' Kids Can Read "operate on two levels" by letting players follow the story narrative and by exploring the story's contents. Meanwhile, the De-Jean, Miller and Olson (1995) study found that children preferred Living Books over Discis as the latter "could not be played with". The Seattle Times compared Living Books' hunt for surprises with Electronic Arts' Fatty Bear's Birthday Surprise and Putt-Putt Goes to the Moon. Bloomberg positively compared the series to interactive storybooks from Packard Bell Electronics subsidiary Active Imagination, deemed the latter "not quite as rich". Children's Technology Review thought TabTale's 2011 app The Ugly Duckling imitated the Living Books style. Complex asserts that Reading Blaster and Science Blaster never received the same amount of attention as Math Blaster! due to "failing to live up to competition from the likes of the Living Books series", and wrote that Living Books could "hold a candle" as a Carmen Sandiego contemporary. Game Developer Magazine grouped together Living Books and Big Tuna Productions titles into The Living Book Series, though noted the latter was a pale imitation of the former.

== Critical reception ==
=== As a learning tool ===
Many reviewers praised the series as a learning tool. Multiple Perspectives on Difficulties in Learning Literacy and Numeracy felt the series offers children a narrative context to explore while giving them authority and control over the interface to motivate them to learn. The New York Times described it as "a reading lesson dressed up as an interactive cartoon". Compute! felt that the interaction led players to a "cartoon fantasy...wonderful, witty world of zaniness" that was both fun and educational. Children's Interactions And Learning Outcomes With Interactive Talking Books deemed the series "very much 'edutainment’". Folha appreciated that the games did not present the player with puzzles to solve. Multiple Perspectives on Difficulties in Learning Literacy and Numeracy asserts that the software had been "cleverly crafted" so that play could not commence until after the page had been read with each word highlighted, offering a narrative context for the children. The Educational Technology Handbook praised the series' 'whole language' approach. According to Technology & Learning, Living Books has the "ever-present message that reading is joyful, important and empowering". Tampa Bay Times wrote that they "respect their audience's intelligence". The Baltimore Sun felt the series was "educational and entertaining". The Guardian felt the series was " well suited for Years 1 and 2, and provide stories with patterned and predictable structures." The Children's Trust wrote that the series improves short-term memory, attention and organisational skills, independence and accuracy, language development, decision-making and problem-solving, and visual scanning. The Exceptional Parent recommended the series for parents wanting to "develop [their] child's interest in words and reading". Village Reading Center''s Susan Rapp said Arthur's Reading Race was an "enjoyable first learning tool". PC Mag highlighted that the series was known for the messages they teach children, be it "the rewards of sharing" or "learn[ing] to separate fantasy from fact". According to Multiple Perspectives on Difficulties in Learning Literacy and Numeracy, the programs were "designed by cognitive scientists who knew about the psychology of both learning and play". The Age felt that the activities presented in the Framework kit were "quite structured" and "would be welcomed by teachers just starting out". Dan Keating of the Logansport Pharos-Tribune wrote the series was "interactive, entertaining and educational" and that the product line "pleased [him] every time. ACTTive Technology suggests, "a child teaches himself to read a book like Just Grandma and Me independently and with the help ONLY of the computer".

The series had been highlighted for its incidental learning. One 2004 study in which Grade 1 and 2 Spanish/Hebrew speaking immigrant children playing the English version for 2 months, recognised and pronounced 70% of the story's words, suggesting that the game offered a "massive and effort-free 'incidental learning'" experience. The children reached a high level of proficiency in understanding and pronouncing of English words just by intensely playing Living Books, despite not coming from English-speaking backgrounds and being illiterate in English. Another study found that the engaging and motivating design of Living Books' creative construction approach achieved effective incidental, unexpected, and by-product learning. The Philadelphia Inquirer reported that children with autism who had never spoken a word imitated the phrase "I'm sorry" from the series after playing, noting that the series assisted children with neurological problems to process and retrieve information.

Other critics questioned the series' efficacy as a learning tool. The Age notes that the idea of presenting a book with interactivity, sound, and music was a "whole new idea" that "left many unsure as to its soundness"; reactions from teachers were mixed, with some believing it added "another dimension to literature", while others felt it would have been "cheaper and more worthwhile" to buying the class physical copies of each book. While Simson L. Garfinkel and Beth Rosenberg of Boston Globe Online found Living Books to be of high quality in a market flooded with "questionable" releases for children, they stated that not all of the titles lived up to the company's educational claims, noting Dr. Seuss' ABC, and Arthur's Reading Race as exceptions. In a 1995 study Preparation of Teachers for Computer and Multimedia-Based Instruction in Literacy, "students were consistently impressed with the entertainment value of such software, but extremely dubious about their classroom usefulness". A study presented to American Educational Research Association in 1996 showed that "jazzy 'interactive storybooks' like Harry and the Haunted House...promote less reading comprehension in kids than moderately interactive, more fact-oriented CD-ROMs like Discis Books’ Thomas’ Snowsuit". SuperKids suggested that while the programs wouldn't teach kids to read, it may "enhance a pre-reading child's interest in, and appreciation for books". The Independent described it as "quasi-educational material" due to being "designed to inject fun into learning". The New York Times wrote that the educational content seemed like an afterthought, adding that they were "horrified" that Arthur's Computer Adventure activity 'Deep Dark Sea', instead of teaching children world geography or ocean life, was "pure entertainment" game. The Washington Post wondered if children would learn to read or just play with the illustrations. The Goldstein, Olivares and Valmont (1996) study found that children had trouble recalling the narrative as they "approached the reading as a game, rather than a text". Complex questioned whether the series "took away a bit of the imagination inherent to reading, though noted they were "undeniably fun". The Age wrote, I'm sure they entertain more than educate, but either way they create a new dimension to children's literature".

=== Hotspots and interactivity ===
The series has been praised for its use of hotspots and interactivity. The Age noted that upon the series' original release, "some people saw it simply as a form of interactive cartoon, while others have described the Living Books series as little more than a talking book". Compute thought that in "typical Broderbund fashion", Living Books "goes way beyond a simple storytelling program". CD-ROMs Rated by Les Kranz praised the number of clickable areas in Little Monster at School. The Independent liked the "hidden cartoons in every page". PC Magazine said that Just Grandma and Me and Arthur's Teacher Trouble's hotspots "will keep kids amused long after they've read the words". Compute! wrote Living Books is "overflowing with one enchanting discovery after another". Folha appreciated that the series encouraged players to discover by moving around the screen, giving movement and speech to objects. The New York Times praised Just Grandma and Me for its interactive "distractions" alongside the story text and illustrations. Technology & Learning opined, "the developers seem to have delighted in creating imaginative events". The Seattle Times said Just Grandma and Me was "full of discovery". SuperKids felt The Tortoise and the Hare had a "captivating variety of exploration opportunities for young minds". Wired thought the peripheral elements were "cleverly" designed to be "playful", "imaginative", and "sometimes humorous". Children's Tech Review wrote that the series combined full color animation with a "crisp, responsive design" that "stood out from the rest".

The Tampa Bay Times reported their child testers willingly forwent Beavis, Butt-Head and WWF Wrestling to play the program, arguing the series' secret ingredient was "creativity". Entertainment Weekly praised Arthur's Birthday for its "inventive ending" and "hilarious hidden secrets". PC Mag called the series "charming", "delightful", "engaging", and "entertaining". Parent's Choice wrote "the thought and creativity that was put into the interactivity in Berenstain Bears Get in a Fight is largely unmatched in any other interactive book." The Seattle Times wrote that the game's simplicity is a draw, as they lack "whizzy technology or tortured attempts to be interactive". The Educational Technology Handbook liked that the series "permit[s] user control over pace, sequencing, and help". Family PC noted their success was due to "let[ting] kids explore and find a cause-and-effect relationship between clicking the mouse and having something happen on the screen." All Game deemed Berenstain Bears in the Dark a "useful addition to any child's library of computer games". Game Developer Magazine felt the series "flunks out", in versatility as players are unable to "abort an animation" despite some of them being quite long. Jim Shatz-Akin at MacUser suggested, "they're not as interactive as they could be...The Berenstain Bears Get in a Fight has long animations during which all a kid can do is sit and watch".

=== Graphics and animation; music and sound ===
The series has been praised for its graphics and animation. CD-ROMs Rated by Les Kranz praised the graphics of Little Monster at School Compute! deemed Living Books a "new style of storytelling that is just a hop away from a fully interactive cartoon"; the magazine praised the animation sequences as "topnotch" and "approach[ing] cartoon quality, as well as the character-adding facial expressions". The Tampa Bay Times noted the animations have the quality of Saturday morning cartoons. Meanwhile, The New York Times Guide to the Best Children's Videos thought the characters in Arthur's Computer Adventure were "stiff" compared to those in the TV show. Sally Fennema-Jansen's paper, Essential tools of the trade notes programs like Living Books and the Early Learning House offer a variety of visual effects which are essential in engaging students at the computer. CD-ROMs Rated wrote that children would be disappointed by other interactive storybooks like Mud Puddle and The Paper Bag Princess due to them lacking Living Book''s animated illustrations. PC Mag felt the games were "PC's answer to the tradition of big screen animated films". The New Straits Times thought the graphics were "colourful and sharp" despite being on a 256 color display. The Baltimore Sun thought the series had "delightful animation" with "zany surprises". The Washington Post described the programs as the "electronic equivalent of pop-up books"; it felt the "animations are whimsical enough to amuse parents". Children's Tech Review wrote that they featured "state-of-the art graphics and sound". Tampa Bay Times described Living Books as "[like] a cartoon episode of Masterpiece Theatre". Computer Shopper's Carol S. Holzberg said Sheila Rae was a "wonderfully upbeat and toe-tapping reading adventure".

The series has been praised for its music and sound. The New York Times praised Just Grandma and Me for offering a "captivating" soundtrack. Sally Fennema-Jansen's paper, Essential tools of the trade notes programs like Living Books and the Early Learning House offer a variety of auditory effects which are essential in engaging students at the computer. An information sheet published by British Educational Communications and Technology Agency said the series "work[ed] well with children who are unresponsive and who avoid conversation, as they become involved with the combination of sound effects, spoken text and visual display". The paper 'Multimedia materials for language and literacy learning' suggested that the "animation and special effects may improve the quality of the story model by providing multi-sensory cues to children with language and literacy disorders who might otherwise ignore important contextual information". SuperKids felt The Tortoise and the Hare had a "clear presentation". SuperKids thought Stellalluna was a "beautifully done version". Compute! thought New Kid on the Block "adds a new dimension" to Living Books.

=== Adaption of books ===
The series has been praised for its adaption of books. The Tampa Bay Times felt that The Tortoise and the Hare "demonstrates that even a timeworn tale can be revived for youthful audiences with multimedia dazzle". Courant felt that the success of its games was aided by the "opportunities for animation and fun" within their source material. Publishers Weekly, in a review of Dr. Seuss' ABC, stated that "the producers' fondness for Dr. Seuss and their fidelity to his sense of refined silliness spill into every sequence." On the other hand, reviewing two Dr. Seuss titles, The Washington Post criticised Living Books for "re-purposing content" and "exploiting existing media franchises", adding that "nearly all of the additions mangle or simply ignore the Seuss sensibility". PC Mag felt Living Books' Arthur's Birthday "captured all the charm of the original". The Photographic Image in Digital Culture thought Living Books was a "successful reworking of children's literature". Business Standard felt Green Eggs and Ham was "faithful to the original", while MacWorld felt it offered a "charming, lighthearted adaptation". The Educational Technology Handbook praised the series' use of quality literature. MetzoMagic thought Green Eggs and Ham would be "irresistible for Dr Seuss devotees". SuperKids felt Green Eggs and Ham was a "very good program, based on an excellent story". Allgame felt Arthur's Reading Race was "sure to delight children who enjoy the adventures of Arthur in books or on TV". Macworld suggested that Arthur's Reading Race's success was "a testament to Arthur's entertainment value".

Complex felt the games allowed kids to "live out their personal Pagemaster fantasies" Superkids thought Tortoise and the Hare "does the old story justice". The Baltimore Sun liked that Living Books chose to adapt a "well-written story with a moral". The Seattle Times noted the series' short playtime, though noted it replay value due to children liking to revisit favourite books. SuperKids also noted the series' replayability, as their kid reviewers engaged with the story even if they had read it before. Conversely, The Daily Gazette warned that Arthur's Computer Adventure wouldn't hold kids' attention for long. Mac Observer described the series as "cognitive dissonance free" as opposed to other interactive storybooks where the "action either contradicts the story or adds nothing to the narrative being employed". On the other hand, Len Unsworth's paper "Reframing research and literacy pedagogy relating to CD narratives" noted the dissonance between text and action; in Stellaluna "They perched in silence for a long time" is followed with incongruous activity and noise instead of a reflective pause; Unsworth's writes that the actions are "gratuitous intrusions into the story and which do not appear in the book version in any form". Simson L. Garfinkel and Beth Rosenberg felt that the added dialogue supplementing the book's text was sometimes "out of character". Of The Tortoise and the Hare, Creighton University said, "By comparison with the exciting interactive program, the book is only okay".

Many critics wrote about the series as a reading tool compared to the physical book. The New York Times questioned the addition of the "original "dead" book" with the CD-ROM adaption, suggesting "most children never get around to opening the real book". Hartford Courant opined "[it] just isn't as good as sitting on the sofa with your child on your lap and a stack of books next to you". Salon suggested the series had a portability problem when compared to traditional books, and that they didn't work as "sleeper-friendly software". Donald R Roberts, chairman of Stanford University's Department of Communication, felt there were important "social dimensions" involved in the parent-child reading process that couldn't be replicated through a digital book, including contact and a sense of security. World Village felt Living Books "handsomely realized the story" of The Berenstain Bears: In the Dark. German site Rhein-zeitung.de felt the "combination of CD and book has the best conditions to become a bestseller". PC Mag noted that the series offers a narrator that can read the same page over again "without complaint".

=== Humour, writing, and ease of use ===
How Living Books became critically acclaimed software

Some of the best and most entertaining software titles ever developed have been electronic adaptations of popular children's literature. The numerous delightful animations, rich screens, and appealing characters found in titles such as Just Grandma and Me (Broderbund's early offering, considered by many a standard-setter) made them great favorites with children, and the undemanding way in which they invited kids to become active readers was appealing to adults.

— Reviewer Charles Parham, Technology & Learning (1995)

Many critics praised the series' humour and wit. The Independent thought the best titles were "amusing" with funny storylines. Compute! deemed Ruff's Bone "the funniest Living Book so far". The Children's Trust lamented that Living Books wasn't aimed at an older audience, but wrote that the storybooks were sufficient for their patients due to being "amusing". PC Mag thought Living Books pack enough humor and tickle adults as they entertain children". Compute! conceded that even adults would be "affected by its delightful story and sharp sense of wit." Len Unsworth's paper "Reframing research and literacy pedagogy relating to CD narratives" writes that Stellaluna was a "very significantly change" from the "somewhat serious tone" of the book due to an "almost a slapstick approach to frivolous humour". The Baltimore Sun felt the activities were the "right blend of humor and purpose". MacWorld deemed Arthur's Reading Games an "amusing, interactive product". Courant felt that while the developer had "the formula figured out".

Upon previewing the second title in the series, Computer Gaming World wrote that Just Grandma and Me was "not just a creative fluke", and felt Living Books "may have the wit and imagination to keep the magic in the series indefinitely". Tes.com thought of Just Grandma and Me, "There's so much charm that parents, and teachers, will enjoy it too." World Village thought Arthur's Reading Race was "very well written". The Baltimore Sun felt the games "vary dramatically in quality" while The Independent agreed that the books' quality fluctuates. Superkids felt Arthur's Computer Adventure was "not the strongest entry in the Living Books product line".

Many reviewers praised the series for its ease of use. Compute! noted "it's a cinch for even very young children to run the program without adult assistance". The Spokesman Review described the series as "Broderbund's software version of training wheels." Simson L. Garfinkel and Beth Rosenberg found that the CD-ROMs played better on Macs than on PCs. The New Straits Times felt their "simple and interactive interface" gave Living Books and "edge" over its competitors. Engadget deemed it "the young-kid equivalent of Cyan's revolutionary Myst immersive world". The Tampa Bay Times felt the titles were "crash-proof" with "rock-solid reliability and kid-friendly ease of use", adding that it succeeds in "encouraging children to become comfortable using a computer". All Game noted that no documentation is provided but that "everything is self-explanatory and intuitive within the program". The Age suggested that the games would only become popular in Australian schools once they had regular access to CD-ROM units.

=== Race and gender, and in translation ===
MacUser felt that Living Books and Edmark's Early Learning House overcame the issue of exclusively Caucasian characters in younger children's programs through the use of animal and friendly monster protagonists. The New York Times Guide to the Best Children's Videos felt the use of a female role model in Sheila Rae, The Brave was "excellent". Allgame thought Sheila Rae was an "excellent program for young girls and boys". One study of The Tortoise and the Hare found that some of its incidental hot spots included stereotypical depictions of male and female behaviours. MacAddict criticised the Little Ark Interactive title Daniel in the Lions’ Den for teaching stereotypes; the titular protagonist Daniel is thrown into the lions’ den by three "not-so-wise" men who are characterised as fat, hunchbacked, and with darker skin respectively, together acting like the Three Stooges.

In 1994, Aktueller Software Markt praised two entries in the series and concluded the review by begging for a German translation of the programs. After a local version was launched in 1998–9, German site Feibel noted that "the translation was done by people who have no idea about the German language", adding that "particularly disturbing is the voice of the grandmother, who has an American accent"; the site argued that "the accent alienates the text" and "significantly reduced the quality of the story". Of the international dubs, reviewer Roger Frost commented "It's interesting that several teams of experts worked on these, just to 'dub' them so that lip movements matched the new dialogue". The Age wrote that, the "ongoing popularity of adventure games" including the Carmen Sandiego series, Flowers of Crystal and Dragonworld, showed promise that Living Books would "become very popular in Australian classrooms"

=== Re-releases and Little Ark Interactive ===
The Seattle Times though felt the additions in the Version 2.0 re-releases wouldn't be enough to convince customers to re-purchase the program. Of the Wanderful re-releases, Engadget questioning whether the storybooks would hold up in the current market though noted the "effort and care that went into their original versions". Children's Technology Review wrote of Wanderful's Ruff's Bone app, "[it's] a good book meets solid interactive design, in this updated iPad edition of the classic Living Book". CNBC deemed the dynamic language function in the Wanderful re-releases a "stunningly simple and powerful feature unlike anything found in other interactive storybooks or eBooks". Mac Observer felt the Wanderful upgrade had "well researched curriculua and activities aligned with the Common Core State Standards Initiative". Children's Tech Review noted that on the iPad screen, the graphics look "bitmapped" and "fuzzy" as if they have been "directly ported", though noted this gives the programs a "retro" look; they praised the hotspots as "still-funny-after-all-these-years" and the sound as having not "faded a bit". The site praised the modern multi-touch environment that "enhance[s] a child's feeling of control". They noted that while Living Books still had its "magic", "unlike the '90s, [children] have many more choices".

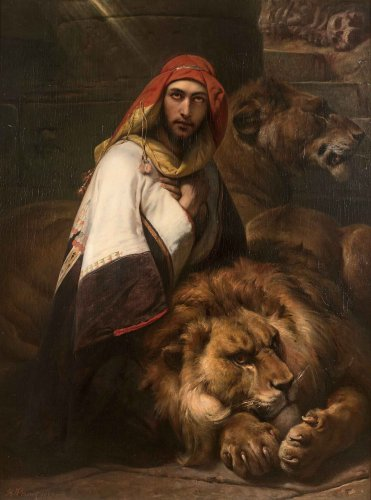
One of Little Ark Interactive's titles, Daniel in the Lions Den adapts the biblical story of Daniel, who is saved from lions by God.

MacUser felt that Little Ark Interactive pair of titles would be a "huge assist" to any parent struggling to answer the question 'What is the Bible' from a religious or a cultural perspective; it felt the titles could open the possibility for parent-child discussions on alternative races and religions. The magazine praised the way the programs told the simple story through fun, bright colours, entertaining music adding, "it's rare to find such enjoyable music in a kid's game". MacAddict chose not to have public school children review the programs so as to maintain separation of church and state. It felt the titles were "charming", but lacked "real Bible education"; commenting that their review by a multidenominational, ecumenical panel during developed led to The Story of Creation being "watered down" to "just a bunch of singing and dancing [and] cute animations". Arizona Republic wrote that The Story of Creation presented the creation of the world in a "very basic way", and that players shouldn't "expect to be dazzled". Larry Blasko of the Associated Press noted that The Story of Creation is one of the most well-known Bible stories, and that it was impressive for Little Ark Interactive to be able to present it to children through "creative" software in a "clever and amusing way"; he like the use of a child's voice was a "nice touch". Blasko added The Story of Creation "shows no discernible denominational tilt", and the fact that God is never pictured means it "should pass muster for all flavors of doctrine". Logansport Pharos-Tribune praised Living Books' "associated group of titles".

Of the Wanderful re-releases of Little Ark, Children's Technology Review wrote "[these] bible stories that come to life, in the context of a solid 'Living Book' shell" due to their "effective language immersion experience", and suggested their use of slapstick humor "could actually make religion fun." Sunday Software noted that The Story of Creation was the only CD-ROM "in existence" for young children about creation, and commented the "cute" program had "good graphics".

=== Recommendations and scores ===
Many reviewers directly recommended their audience to purchase Living Books. Technology & Learning wrote in the Weakness section of their review, "it is hard to find fault with a program that is as well thought out and entertaining as Just Grandma and Me". The Seattle Times wrote that Just Grandma and Me is "the best program I've seen for this age group". Publishers Weekly, in a review of Dr. Seuss' ABC, called that title "one of the best children's CD-ROMs to date. Compute thought Living Books was a "rare piece of software that doesn't suffer at least a minor flaw or two". World Village deemed Arthur's Reading Race a "must-have program". PC Mag felt Ruff's Bone was the "best Living Books yet". MacUser opined "you can't go wrong" with Living Books or Humungous games. AllGame thought Stellaluna was "very entertaining and is sure to be a hit with children". PC Mag wrote that Broderbund had "scored a major hit" with Living Books. SuperKids' review of Green Eggs and Ham wrote that they "highly recommend the program for any child capable of grasping the story". Just Adventure "heartily recommended" Arthur's Computer Adventure for any "parents who wants to enjoy computer time with their children". Of The Tortoise and the Hare, All Game thought children of all ages would "enjoy this story a great deal". Reviewer Roger Frost felt that Living Books, along with Sesame Street titles, had "enough plus points to make them powerfully magnetic". Daily Egyptian thought the titles were "standouts" while Deseret News called them "excellent". Parent's Choice said Arthur's Birthday was "one of the best ways you can spend 5 bucks for your child."

The series has received consistently high review scores. Arthur's Teacher Trouble, The Tortoise and the Hare, Ruff's Bone, and Little Monster at School all received a very high score of over 90.00 in CD-ROMs Rated. MacUser's December 1994 issue contained reviews on all eight titles released at that point, and scored each a 4 or 4.5 out of 5.All Game gave Arthur's reading race 4.5 stars out of 5. Just Adventure gave Arthur's Computer Adventure a top rating of A, while All Game gave it 4/5 stars.

== Awards ==
Year	Nominee / work	Award	Result
1992–1997	Just Grandma and Me	Winner of over 16 awards since its release in 1992	Won
1993–1997	Arthur's Teacher Trouble	Winner of 15 awards since its release in 1993–1997	Won
1993	Living Books	PC Magazine: Award of Technical Excellence	Won
1993	Living Books	Popular Science Magazine: Award of Technical Excellence	Won
1993	Living Books	PC Entertainment Magazine: Special Achievement in Design Excellence	Won
1994	New Kid on the Block	National Educational Film and Video Silver Apple Award	Won
1994	The Tortoise and the Hare	Macworld: Award for Best Entertainment CD in the Children/Young Adult's Category	Won
1994	The Tortoise and the Hare	NewMedia Magazine: Invision Multimedia Award for Gold in the Games, Edutainment Category	Won
1994	The Tortoise and the Hare	Macworld: "One of the Year's Top 10 CD-ROMS"	Won
1994	Ruff's Bone	Cybermania '94: Outstanding Special Achievement	Won
1994	Ruff's Bone	Cybermania '94: Educational Award: Interactive Books	Won
1994	Living Books	Macworld: World-Class Award	Won
1994–1995	Living Books	Software Publishers Association: Technology and Learning Next in Series Award	Won
1995	Arthur's Birthday	National Educational Media Network: Gold Apple Award	Won
1995	Harry and the Haunted House	NewMedia Magazine: Bronze Invision Award for Technical/Creative Excellence, Best Audio/Soundtrack	Won
1995	Harry and the Haunted House	National Educational Media Network: Bronze Apple Award	Won
1995	Living Books	Macworld: "One of the Year's Top 10 CD-ROMs"	Won
1995	Living Books	Dr. Toy: 100 Best Children's Products	Won
1995	Living Books	The Computer Museum Guide to the Best Software: Best Software for Kids	Won
1995	Living Books	Multimedia World: Readers' Choice Award	Won
1996	Sheila Rae the Brave	MacWorld: runner-up to "One of the Year's Top 10 CD-ROMS"	Won
1997–98	Arthur's Reading Race	Technology & Learning: Home Learning Software Award	Won
1998	Arthur's Computer Adventure	Newsweek	Recommendation
2005	Living Books	Technology & Learning: Awards of Excellence – Readers' Choice Award	Won
2006	Dr. Seuss's ABC	Technology & Learning: Award of Excellence	Won
2007	Sheila Rae, the Brave	Technology & Learning: Award of Excellence	Won
2008	Living Books	Home PC: Editor's Choice 100 Top Products	Won
2009	Living Books	National Parenting Center: Seal of Approval	Won
2010	Harry and the Haunted House	Children's Technology Review: Editor's Choice Award	Won
2011	Arthur's Teacher Trouble	Children's Technology Review: Editor's Choice Award	Won
2012	Wanderful's Ruff's Bone	Children's Technology Review: Editor's Choice Award	Won
2013	Arthur's Birthday	Parents' Choice Awards: Parents' Choice Gold Honor Award	Won
2013	Wanderful's Berenstain Bears Get in a Fight	Parents' Choice Awards: Parents' Choice Gold Honor Award	Won
2013	Wanderful's Berenstain Bears in the Dark	Parents' Choice Awards: Parents' Choice Gold Honor Award	Won
2013	Wanderful's The Tortoise and the Hare	Parents' Choice Awards: Parents' Choice Gold Honor Award	Won
2013	Arthur's Teacher Trouble	Parents' Choice Awards: Silver Honor Award	Won
2013	Harry and the Haunted House	Parents' Choice Awards: Silver Honor Award	Won
2013	Ruff's Bone	Parent's Choice Recommended	Won
2013	Wanderful's Storybooks Sampler	Parents' Choice Approved	Won
2014	The Berenstain Bears in the Dark	The Children's eBook Award for Best Bedtime App: Gold	Won
2014	The Berenstain Bears in the Dark	The Children's eBook Award for Best Special Needs Autism App: Gold	Won
2014	The New Kid on the Block	The Children's eBook Award for Best Special Education App: Silver	Won
2014	Little Monster At School	The Children's eBook Award for Best Special Education App: Bronze	Won
2014	Harry and the Haunted House	The Children's eBook Award for Best Adventure App: Silver	Won
2014	Arthur's Birthday	The Children's eBook Award for Best Birthday App: Bronze	Won
2014	Arthur's Teacher Trouble	The Children's eBook Award for Best Early Reader App: Gold	Won
2014	The Tortoise and the Hare	The Children's eBook Award for Best Early Reader App: Bronze	Won
2014	Little Ark Interactive's The Story of Creation	The Children's eBook Award for Best Early Learner App: Silver	Won
2015	Wanderful	Mom's Choice: Gold Award	Won

=== Little Ark Interactive awards ===
Year	Nominee / work	Award	Result
2014	The Story of Creation	Children's Technology Review: Editor's Choice Award	Won
2014	Daniel in the Lion's Den	Children's Technology Review: Editor's Choice Award	Won

== Plot and gameplay ==
Living Books are interactive storybooks – effectively a blend of computer games and hypertext fiction. They are "electronic versions of either narrative or expository texts that combine high quality animations and graphics with speech, sound, music, and special effect". Primarily using classic children's literature source material, the series adapted these stories CD and dressed them up with music, animation and real-voice narrations.

Living Books feature highlighted text while the stories are being read by a narrator. Afterwards, players can interact with the environment via hotspots. The programs were released in many languages.

The plots are faithful to their respective books. The games are generally adaptions of books from popular children's franchises such as Arthur, Berenstain Bears, and Dr. Seuss, but three titles exclusively created by Living Books (not being existing book adaptions) included Ruff's Bone (co-produced by Colossal Pictures), Harry and the Haunted House, and a retelling of The Tortoise and the Hare.

Interactive storybooks are a storytelling device that encourages kids to take part. Users are able to virtually turn the pages, click on various areas to get sound effects and short animation sequences, or they can click on words and sentences to hear them read aloud. The games allow players read the book in US English, UK English, and other languages, or to have it read to them in each language by a narrator. Players are offered two ways of reading the story: Read To Me (only allowing players to flip pages) and Let Me Play (including player interaction). The former imitated a traditional storybook, with linear progression from beginning to end, while the latter offered a more compartmentalized experience, where children can pause to investigate the various worlds. The story text is written at the top of the page and highlighted as each word is read by the narrator, however some additional character dialogue is not printed. After a child finishes reading a page, they can explore it by clicking on objects to see what they do. They can hear selected words or phrases by clicking on them. The screen "becomes a playground".

Players experience animations and voice acting, while clicking on hidden hotspots reveal surprise animations, sound effects, songs, and sight gags. One page can have up to 44 active buttons and 5 navigational buttons. Each scene is self-contained and players can navigate page-by-page using the forward and backward cursor keys. The screen fades to black during the transition between scenes. The programs came with built-in customizing features to include, exclude, sequence, and vary the length of the games; or to adjust the speech. Many of the titles are accompanied by teacher guides with photocopiable resources.

Little Ark Interactive follow a similar formula, either the player can choose 'Read-to-me' and have the narrator tell the story which is supplemented by animations; or they can choose 'Let Me Play' and explore page by page, clicking on hotspots to reveal sight gags and music cues.

== Titles in the series ==
Title	Release date	Languages	Based on	No. of pages
Living Books: Just Grandma and Me	February 7, 1992 (Macintosh, Tandy VIS); April 10, 1992 (Windows) 1997 (V2) 2015 (iOS)	(United States); (United Kingdom); (Japan) (V 1.0); (Mexico) (V 1.0); (Spain) (V 2.0); (Italy); (France) (V 2.0); (Germany) (V 2.0); (Brazil) (V 2.0); (Israel)	Mercer Mayer's; Just Grandma and Me, 1983 (Little Critters series)	12
Living Books: Arthur's Teacher Trouble	October 1, 1992 (PC); 2012 (iOS)	(United States); (Mexico)	Marc Brown's; Arthur's Teacher Trouble, 1986 (Arthur series)	24
Living Books: Aesop's The Tortoise and the Hare	September 12, 1993 (PC/Mac); 2012 (iOS)	(United States); (United Kingdom); (Mexico); (Italy); (France) (iOS); (Germany) (iOS); (Japan) (iOS); (China) (iOS); (Russia) (iOS); (Korea) (iOS); (Israel)	Mark Schlichting's Aesop's Fable The Tortoise and the Hare, 1993 (PC/Mac) (Living Books original)	12
Living Books: The New Kid on the Block	December 10, 1993 (PC); 2014 (iOS)	(United States)	Jack Prelutsky and James Stevenson's; The New Kid on the Block, 1984	17
Living Books: Little Monster at School	December 10, 1993 (Philips CD-i); July 18, 1994 (PC/Mac); 2012 (iOS)	(United States); (United Kingdom); (Mexico); (Italy); (China); (France) (iOS); (Germany) (iOS); (Japan) (iOS)	Mercer Mayer's; Little Monster at School, 1978 (Little Critters series)	18
Living Books: Ruff's Bone	May 13, 1994 (PC); 2013 (iOS)	(United States); (Mexico)	Eli Noyes's; Ruff's Bone, 1994 (Living Books original)	12
Living Books: Arthur's Birthday	June 24, 1994 (PC) 1997 (V2); 2013 (iOS)	(United States); (United Kingdom); (Mexico) (V 1.0); (France) (iOS); (Germany) (iOS); (Brazil) (V 2.0)	Marc Brown's; Arthur's Birthday, 1989 (Arthur series)	13
Living Books: Harry and the Haunted House	July 22, 1994 (PC); 2012 (iOS)	(United States); (United Kingdom); (Mexico); (China); (France) (iOS); (Germany) (iOS); (Japan) (iOS)	Mark Schlichting's; Harry and the Haunted House, 1987 (Living Books original)	12
Living Books: The Berenstain Bears Get in a Fight	July 28, 1995 (PC); 2013 (iOS)	(United States); (United Kingdom); (Mexico); (France); (Japan) (iOS); (Brazil)	Stan and Jan Berenstain's; The Berenstain Bears Get in a Fight, 1982 (The Berenstain Bears series)	11
Living Books: Dr. Seuss's ABC	August 11, 1995 (PC)	(United States); (China)	Dr. Seuss'; Dr. Seuss's ABC, 1963 (Dr. Seuss series)	26
Living Books: Sheila Rae, the Brave	February 27, 1996 (PC)	(United States); (United Kingdom); (Mexico); (France); (Japan); (Italy); (Germany); (China)	Kevin Henkes' Sheila Rae, the Brave, 1987	12
Living Books: The Berenstain Bears in the Dark	June 26, 1996 (PC); 2013 (iOS)	(United States)	Stan and Jan Berenstain's; The Berenstain Bears in the Dark, 1982 (The Berenstain Bears series)	12
Living Books: Green Eggs and Ham	July 26, 1996 (PC)	(United States)	Dr. Seuss'; Green Eggs and Ham, 1960 (Dr. Seuss series)	19
Living Books: Stellaluna	August 23, 1996 (PC); 2015 (iOS)	(United States); (Brazil); (Portugal)	Jannell Cannon's Stellaluna, 1993	14
Living Books: Arthur's Reading Race	January 28, 1997 (PC)	(United States)	Marc Brown's; Arthur's Reading Race, 1996 (Arthur series)	12
Living Books: The Cat in the Hat	August 15, 1997 (PC)	(United States)	Dr. Seuss'; The Cat in the Hat, 1957 (Dr. Seuss series)	12
Living Books: Maggie's Farmyard Adventure	November 1, 1997 (PC)	(United States)	Living Books original	6
Living Books: Arthur's Computer Adventure	August 3, 1998 (PC)	(United States)	Marc Brown's; Arthur's Computer Disaster, 1997 (Arthur series)	16
Living Books: D.W. the Picky Eater (aka Arthur's Adventures With D.W.)	December 28, 1998 (PC)	(United States)	Marc Brown's; D.W. the Picky Eater, 1995 (Arthur series)	12

=== Little Ark Interactive titles ===
Title	Release date	Languages	Based on	No. of pages
Little Ark Interactive Daniel in the Lions Den	January 28, 1997	(United States)	Daniel in the lions' den Bible story	
Little Ark Interactive The Story of Creation	January 28, 1997	(United States)	Genesis creation narrative Bible story	
Little Ark Interactive Noah's Ark	(2016 re-release)	(United States)	Genesis flood narrative Bible story	
