= Sheila Rae, the Brave =

1987 picture book by Kevin Henkes

- Front cover
- Author: Kevin Henkes
- Illustrator: Kevin Henkes
- Cover artist: Kevin Henkes
- Language: English
- Series: Mouse Books
- Genre: Children's story
- Publisher: HarperCollins; The Living Books Company
- Publication date: August 17, 1987; 39 years ago
- Publication place: United States
- Media type: Print (Paperback)
- ISBN: 0-688-07155-4
- Preceded by: A Weekend with Wendell
- Followed by: Chester's Way

Sheila Rae, the Brave is a children's picture book written and illustrated by Kevin Henkes and published in 1987 by HarperCollins and The Living Books Company. It is his seventh book and the second of the Mouse Books series, preceded by A Weekend with Wendell and followed by Chester's Way.

== Plot summary ==
Sheila Rae is a mouse who boastfully claims she is not afraid of anything. She recklessly shows off in front of her friends and classmates acts of bravery such as tying Wendell with her skipping rope for snatching it. In addition, she teases her little sister, Louise, for being afraid of little things. But one day when Sheila Rae wanders down a strange route on her way home from school, Louise gets the better of her and for the first time, Sheila Rae feels afraid, while Louise gains courage and helps Sheila Rae overcome her fear.

== Adaptations ==
=== Computer game ===
The book was adapted into an interactive storybook computer game by Living Books in 1996, and tells the story in English and Spanish. The adaption remains faithful to the original story and contains a Sing-a-Long and Map Game.
