= Dr. Seuss's ABC =

1963 book by Dr Seuss

- Author: Dr. Seuss
- Illustrator: Dr. Seuss
- Language: English
- Genre: Children's literature
- Publisher: Random House
- Publication date: August 29, 1963 (renewed in 1991)
- Publication place: United States
- Media type: Print (hardback and paperback)
- OCLC: 704109017
- Preceded by: Hop on Pop
- Followed by: Fox in Socks

Dr. Seuss's ABC, otherwise referred to as The ABC, is a 1963 English language alphabet book written by Dr. Seuss starring two anthropomorphic yellow dogs named Ichabod and his sister (named Izzy in the Living Books adaptation) as they journey through the alphabet and meet characters whose names begin with each letter. It was read as an audiobook by British comedian Rik Mayall as part of the 2000 audio release The Dr. Seuss Collection.

== Publication history ==
Dr. Seuss drew inspiration from memories of his mother, Nettie Geisel, who read stories to him and his sister Marnie Geisel at bedtime. He and Marnie also took piano lessons. Marnie practiced daily while Dr. Seuss could be bribed with books. Whenever he did well, she took him to Johnson's Book Store and let him choose a book as a reward. Dr. Seuss's ABC was published as a Beginner Book in 1963, alongside Hop on Pop.

== Reception ==
Peter Lewis, writing for Common Sense Media, gave the book positive reviews, stating "Dr. Seuss turns the alphabet from 52 shapes and 26 sounds one has to memorize into an exercise in rhymery and wordplay. Uppercase and lowercase letters are taken for a spirited airing, matched with an apt selection of fun words, all set in the suitably absurd world of Seuss characters and creatures". He also compared the book to Dr. Seuss ("Seuss, faithful to his mission, entertainingly and effectively delivers the educational goods – in this case, the alphabet. The letters each take a turn in the spotlight and then are wedded to a few well-chosen words that convey the Seuss worldview of the high humor to be found in mental play: 'Many mumbling mice are making midnight music in the moonlight ... mighty nice.'") Peter Lewis commented that Dr. Seuss's illustrations "are all about possibility – quacking quacker-oo, policeman in a pail, 10 tired turtles on a tuttle-tuttle tree – that same sense rubs off on the letters: Here, take these letters, they're fun! Rub 'em together and see what you come up with. There is no better way to take the anxiety out of something than to make friends with it." The other good review was "Families can talk about letters and the sounds they make. Think of words that start with the same letter sound – see how many you can string together in a silly sentence or phrase."

Sam Tyler, writing for The Bookbag, called it "a hard book to consider as it is great fun, but also a little maddening". He also stated that "The ABC book is something that toddlers will use early on as a foundation to build later reading on. If they can learn their alphabet, they can develop their words. Most ABCs are super simple with easy to understand and recognise objects representing the letter. This is not that book. Seuss plucked ideas from his books and imagination and threw them onto the page. This means that this ABC outing is more varied and fun than most, but it also a little difficult to follow?"

In the essay "In O Is for" Mouse": First Encounters with the Alphabet Book", Laura B. Smolkin and David B. Yaden, Jr. compared the book to another alphabet book, A is for Angry by Sandra Boynton, stating in the book, "there are frequent changes in the colour and size of the letters from page to page."

The Washington Post called it one of "the best-selling Dr. Seuss books of all time".

In From A to Z: An Exhibition of ABC Books Selected from the John O.C. McCrillis Collection by Alesandra M. Schmidt, she references "10 tired turtles on a tuttle-tuttle tree" in Case 8, stating, while comparing the book to Apricot ABC by Miska Miles, "Ecolological awareness of the 1960's is evident in the imaginative story of an apricot that falls to the ground in a meadow (#48). Bees, birds, and flowers discover the apricot, which finally is eaten to its seed by a chicken and, eventually, becomes a new, young apricot tree. Another kind of tree is seen in Dr. Seuss's alphabet book (#45) – the "tuttle-tuttle tree," for "10 tired turtles."

== Adaptations ==
In the 1995 CD-ROM game by Living Books, A big dog named Ichabod and a little dog named Izzy. This book has an iOS and Android app by Oceanhouse Media.

An augmented reality app version of the book was created by Sugar Creative.

At The Amazing World of Dr. Seuss Museum, The Readingville Exhibit houses The ABC Wall, an interactive larger-than-life wall version of Dr. Seuss's ABC, which allowed children to touch various letters, hear the phonetic sound of the letter being pressed, and see the artwork from the book appear on the wall with the associated text below.

In Journal of the American Society of Echocardiography, James N. Kirkpatrick, MD, director of the Echocardiography Laboratory at the UW Medical Center and associate professor of medicine, uses the letters E for Echocardiography, S for Sinister structural shortcomings, and C for Congestive heart failure from the book in ABCD's of Heart Failure: Echo-ing through the First Stage to outline the stages of heart failure, stating, "In his insightful and witty educational offering, Dr. Seuss's ABC, Theodor Seuss Geisel 1 poses the intriguing rhetorical question "Big A, little a, what begins with A?" He might have answered, "An amalgamated assemblage of advancing ailments affecting the heart" (it works better if you consider the h to be silent.) Dr. Seuss contributed much to world literature but missed the opportunity to create a classification of cardiac conditions".

=== Stage musical version ===
On July 4th, 2026, a Broadway stage musical adaptation based on the 1963 English alphabet book animated film of the same name opened.

== Sources ==
- Schmidt, Alesandra M. "From A to Z: An Exhibition of ABC Books Selected from the John O.C. McCrillis Collection." Watkinson Publications, Weird Tales, 1998. Watkinson Publications. JSTOR community.3451884 Accessed May 5, 2023.
- Neal, Rome. "Dr. Seuss: Fun With Words". CBS. March 4, 2004. Dr. Seuss: Fun With Words – CBS News. Accessed May 4, 2023.
