= Wanderful Interactive Storybooks =

- Founded: 2010; 16 years ago
- Headquarters: Novato, California
- Key people: Jordan Freeman; Mickey W. Mantle; Mark Schlichting
- Products: Interactive Storybook Apps
- Website: www.wanderfulstorybooks.com

Wanderful Interactive Storybooks is a developer of interactive storybook apps based on the titles originally published as Living Books by Broderbund Software.

The company was founded in 2010 by Mickey W. Mantle, who oversaw the original Living Books technology development as Vice President of Engineering and Chief Technical Officer at Broderbund.

Mantle, CEO of Wanderful, assembled a small team of the original Broderbund programmers to create a new engine that could take the animation, graphics, sound and music from the original Living Books CD-ROMs and play them back at full-screen resolution on the iPad using a touch, rather than a mouse driven interface. Mark Schlichting – creator of the Living Books series – joined the team as Chief Creative Officer and developed touch-driven updates to the original mouse-driven interface.

Through a number of corporate mergers, the publisher Houghton Mifflin Harcourt had acquired the rights to the Living Books titles and content. Wanderful bought the rights from HMH to republish the original games, as well as new and updated versions, and concurrently partnered with many of the authors of the individual stories that became Living Books.

Wanderful was acquired by the Jordan Freeman Group in January 2023. On May 17, 2023, the acquisition was made official, along with Freeman's announcement of a partnership with Arthur creator, Marc Brown.

== Living Books titles ==
Wanderful has re-released the following Living Books titles for the Android (operating system), iOS and Windows (in order by release date):

- Arthur's Teacher Trouble (English and Spanish) by Marc Brown
- Little Monster at School (English and Spanish) by Mercer Mayer
- The Tortoise and the Hare (English and Spanish) an Aesop fable
- Harry and the Haunted House (English and Spanish) by Mark Schlichting
- The Berenstain Bears Get In A Fight (English and Spanish) by Stan and Jan Berenstain
- Arthur's Birthday (English and Spanish) by Marc Brown
- The Berenstain Bears In The Dark (English) by Stan and Jan Berenstain
- Ruff's Bone (English and Spanish) By Eli Noyes
- The New Kid on the Block (English) by Jack Prelutsky, Illustrated by James Stevenson
- Dr. Seuss's ABC (English) by Dr. Seuss
- Dr. Seuss's The Cat in the Hat (English) by Dr. Seuss
- Dr. Seuss's Green Eggs and Ham (English) by Dr. Seuss
- Sheila Rae, the Brave (English and Spanish) by Kevin Henkes
- Stellaluna (English and Portuguese) by Janell Cannon
- Just Grandma and Me (English, Japanese and Spanish) by Mercer Mayer
- Maggie's Farmyard Adventure (English) by Pat Farrell
- Arthur's Computer Adventure (English) by Marc Brown
- Arthur's Reading Race (English) by Marc Brown
- D.W., The Picky Eater (English) by Marc Brown

== Additional titles ==
Wanderful has re-released, under their Wanderful Edutainment banner, the following non-Living Books titles for Windows (in order by release date):

- Arthur's 1st Grade (English) by Marc Brown
- Arthur's 2nd Grade (English) by Marc Brown
- Arthur's Kindergarten (English) by Marc Brown
- Arthur's Math Games (English) by Marc Brown
- Arthur's Pet Chase (English) by Marc Brown
- Arthur's Preschool (English) by Marc Brown
- Arthur's Reading Games (English) by Marc Brown
- Arthur's Sand Castle Contest (English) by Marc Brown
- Arthur's Thinking Games (English) by Marc Brown
- Arthur's Camping Adventure (a.k.a. Arthur's Wilderness Rescue) (English) by Marc Brown

== Educational Elements ==
Wanderful has created classroom activity guides for each of the storybook apps.
