= Mark Schlichting =

American novelist

- Born: March 17, 1948 (age 78); Oakland, California, U.S.
- Citizenship: United States
- Education: California State University, East Bay
- Website: https://www.noodleworks.com/

Mark Schlichting (born March 17, 1948) is a publisher, author, and digital pioneer of children's multimedia and interactive design software. He is best known as the creator and subsequent Design and Art Director of Broderbund's Living Books series including the original 1994 Living Books PC game Harry and the Haunted House, one of the first lines of children's interactive book software on CD-ROM. Schlichting was Design and Art Director for Living Book's first interactive CD-ROM book adaptation, Mercer Mayer’s Just Grandma and Me, which was one of the first software titles accredited as a school textbook and used as a product demonstration by Apple CEO John Sculley.

== Broderbund’s Living Books ==
Schlichting began working at Broderbund as a freelance animator, where he suggested his idea of creating interactive software based on existing children’s books with each illustrated page of the digital version of the book filled with clickable, interactive "hot spots". He soon became head of the team of the new division called Living Books, where they first began adapting Mercer Mayer’s Just Grandma and Me and Marc Brown’s Arthur’s Teacher Trouble and the original Living Books game Harry and the Haunted House by Mark Schlichting himself into interactive children’s software. The software imitated the real-life experience of reading these books but with enhanced computer features and the ability to read them in multiple languages. These interactive animated digital children's books were the first of their kind and included the option of a “read-through”, where the user could digitally turn the illustrated “pages” and hear a narrator read the text, and the “interactive” version, where users could click around on each page to find and activate dozens of animated sequences, often accompanied by music, sound effects, or dialogue.

== NoodleWorks Interactive ==
In 2000 Schlichting founded NoodleWorks Interactive, which specializes in children's interactive design, development, and design consulting. Under Schlighting's supervision, NoodleWorks Interactive has worked with children's learning and entertainment companies and projects such as LeapFrog, eScore - Learning Centers, Pearson Broadband (Educational Division, London), Fisher/Price, Snicker Interactive Toys, Serosity, Electronic Arts (EA), LBS Alchemy, and more.

In November 2011, Schlichting released Noodle Words, an iPad app for children where they may choose a word from a box and tap it to see animated bee characters act out the word's meaning. Noodle Words received the Kids At Play Interactive, or KAPi, Award for Best Educational Product of The Year, the Parent's Choice Gold Award, a KAPi Pioneer Legend Award for Schlichting, and the Children's Technology Review Editor's Choice Award, among others.

== Wanderful Apps ==
In 2012, Schlichting was Chief Creative Officer of the Wanderful interactive storybooks, where he worked with his former Broderbund and Living Books colleague Mickey W. Mantle to adapt several of his Living Books CD-ROM titles into apps for touchscreen devices. Wanderful released app versions of the Living Books titles The Tortoise and the Hare, Arthur's Teacher Trouble, Little Monster at School, Ruff's Bone, and Schlichting's own children's book Harry and the Haunted House.

== Book and Software Authorship ==
Schlichting is the author and illustrator of Harry and the Haunted House, which he has released in various forms- as a children's book, a Living Books interactive CD-ROM, and, in 2012, an app from Wanderful interactive storybooks. For the iOS app, Schlichting worked with Wanderful in adapting the original Living Books CD-ROM to take advantage of the new touch-screen format, so that "virtually everything" on a page that looked "tappable" could be tapped to "come to life" and activate an animation, sound, or other interactive element, including tapping on the individual words of the text. The Wanderful book app can be in either English or Spanish, and can be purchased to include French as well.

Schlichting released a new nonfiction book in October 2016 on the psychology and art form of interactivity, titled Understanding Kids, Play, and Interactive Design: How to Create Games Children Love.
