= And to Think That I Saw It on Mulberry Street =

1937 Dr. Seuss book

- Author: Dr. Seuss
- Illustrator: Dr. Seuss
- Cover artist: Dr. Seuss
- Language: English
- Genre: Children's literature
- Published: December 21, 1937 (renewed in 1964) Vanguard Press
- Publication place: United States
- Media type: Print (hardcover), Beginner Books
- Pages: 32
- OCLC: 176642
- Followed by: The 500 Hats of Bartholomew Cubbins

And to Think That I Saw It on Mulberry Street (sometimes shortened to just Mulberry Street) is Theodor Seuss Geisel's first children's book published under the name Dr. Seuss. First published by Vanguard Press in 1937, the story follows a boy named Marco, who describes a parade of imaginary people and vehicles traveling along a road, Mulberry Street, in an elaborate fantasy story he dreams up to tell his father at the end of his walk. However, when he arrives home, he decides instead to tell his father what he actually saw—a simple horse and wagon.

Geisel conceived the core of the book aboard a ship in 1936, returning from a European vacation with his wife. The rhythm of the ship's engines captivated him and inspired the book's signature lines: "And that is a story that no one can beat. And to think that I saw it on Mulberry Street."

At least 20 publishers rejected the book before Geisel ran into an old college classmate, who had just become juvenile editor at Vanguard Press. Vanguard agreed to publish the book, and it met with high praise from critics upon release, though sales were not as impressive. Later analyses of the book have focused on its connections to Geisel's childhood; the street of the title is named after a street in Geisel's hometown of Springfield, Massachusetts. Geisel returned to fictionalized versions of Springfield in later books, and Marco appeared again in 1947 in the Dr. Seuss book McElligot's Pool.

In March 2021, Dr. Seuss Enterprises removed Mulberry Street from publication due to images in the book that the estate deemed "hurtful and wrong".

== Plot ==
While walking home from school, a boy named Marco recalls his father's words: "Marco, keep your eyelids up and see what you can see." However, the only thing Marco has seen on his walk is a horse pulling a wagon on Mulberry Street. Marco begins to envision a more fantastical scene; he first turns the horse into a zebra, then a reindeer, and finally an elephant accompanied by two giraffes. The wagon turns into a chariot, then a sled, then a cart carrying a brass band.

Upon realizing that Mulberry Street intersects with Bliss Street, Marco adds a group of police escorts. The scene becomes a parade with a grandstand filled with the mayor and city officials, an airplane dropping confetti, and more. Marco arrives home, eager to share his invented story with his father. However, when his father questions him about what he saw, he responds, "Nothing but a plain horse and wagon on Mulberry Street."

== Background ==
Geisel was 33 and had ten years of experience in cartooning, illustrating and advertising when he began work on Mulberry Street. He had an established and prosperous career in advertising, including a contract with Standard Oil for Flit bug spray. Geisel's popular campaign featured the line "Quick, Henry, the Flit!" He had also made some forays into book publishing: for Viking Press in 1931 he illustrated Boners and More Boners, collections of quotations from children's school papers. The book's positive sales encouraged Geisel to create his own children's book, which his advertising contract did not forbid. In 1932, Geisel wrote and illustrated an alphabet book featuring a collection of odd animals, but was unable to interest publishers in it.

According to Judith and Neil Morgan, Geisel conceived the core of Mulberry Street in the summer of 1936 aboard the MS Kungsholm, a Swedish American luxury liner, during the return trip from a European vacation with his wife, Helen Palmer. As the Kungsholm endured a storm and Geisel experienced sea sickness, he jotted down a rambling plot that started with "a stupid horse and wagon". To keep himself occupied, he began reciting poetry to the rhythm of the ship's engines and soon found himself saying, "And that is a story that no one can beat, and to think that I saw it on Mulberry Street". For days after they landed, he had the rhythm of the ship's engine stuck in his head, so, at Helen's suggestion, he decided to write a story based on it.

The Morgans based this account on interviews with Geisel, who had given similar accounts of the book's creation to journalists throughout his career, often omitting or altering various details. In one version, he had already been working on the book for six months before the European trip, and the trip home provided the final breakthrough. In another, he claimed he had the book about half finished when they landed in the United States.

Geisel, in his perfectionism, struggled with writing Mulberry Street. According to the Morgans, "although he lived for wit, his flights of fancy were subject to strict review". He spent at least six months on the book, questioning every word and writing numerous drafts. He wrote the poem out in pencil on yellow paper and asked his wife to discuss every page with him.

== Publication history ==
Geisel submitted his finished manuscript, originally titled A Story No One Can Beat, to dozens of publishers during the winter of 1936–37. (Note: Geisel claimed, in varying accounts, that the manuscript was rejected by 20, 26, 27, 28, and 29 publishers. Alison Lurie later reported that 43 publishers had rejected the book.) Publishers posited a variety of criticisms of the book, including that fantasy was not salable, that children's books written in verse were out of style, and that the book lacked a clear moral message. According to the Morgans, Geisel angrily exclaimed to his wife, "What's wrong with kids having fun reading without being preached at?" She cited the book's cartoon-like drawings and its story, which might be seen to encourage daydreaming and lying to one's parents, as possible reasons for its rejection.

According to Geisel, he was walking down Madison Avenue in New York City after learning of the latest rejection, planning to burn the manuscript when he got home, when he ran into Mike McClintock, an old Dartmouth College classmate. McClintock had just become juvenile editor at Vanguard Press and took Geisel to his office to introduce him to Vanguard's President James Henle and editor Evelyn Shrifte. Henle had been gaining a reputation for signing authors whom other, larger publishers had rejected. He soon agreed to publish the book, but stipulated that its title be changed. In gratitude to McClintock, Geisel changed the name of the book's protagonist to Marco, after McClintock's son, and dedicated the book to McClintock's wife, Helene.

In "an act of faith", Vanguard Press printed 15,000 copies of the book for its first printing. To promote the book, Henle bought a full-page advertisement in Publishers Weekly, which reproduced the book's two-page spread of a reindeer pulling a cart and featured the line, "Book publishers, hitch on! This is the start of a parade that will take you places!" Approximately two years later, Vanguard printed 6,000 more copies. By 1943, it had printed 31,600 copies, and Geisel's royalties were no more than $3,500. Although Geisel later moved to Random House, Vanguard continued to publish Mulberry Street and his second book, The 500 Hats of Bartholomew Cubbins, until 1988, when Random House bought Vanguard.

Near the end of the book, Marco envisions a Chinese character joining his imagined parade. Early editions of the book called this character a "Chinaman" and depicted him with yellow skin and a queue; Geisel later removed these elements. However, he adamantly refused to change a line that many perceived as sexist: "Say, even Jane could think of that."

== Reception ==
Hearing of its release, neighbors of Geisel's in Springfield were at first worried that the book would be an exposé of the people there. Sales were lackluster, but early reviews were glowing. Clifton Fadiman wrote a one-sentence review in The New Yorker, which Geisel could still quote near the end of his life: "They say it's for children, but better get a copy for yourself and marvel at the good Dr. Seuss' impossible pictures and the moral tale of the little boy who exaggerated not wisely but too well". The New York Times wrote: "Highly original and entertaining, Dr Seuss' picture book partakes of the better qualities of those peculiarly America institutions, the funny papers and the tall tale. It is a masterly interpretation of the mind of a child in the act of creating one of those stories with which children often amuse themselves and bolster up their self-respect".

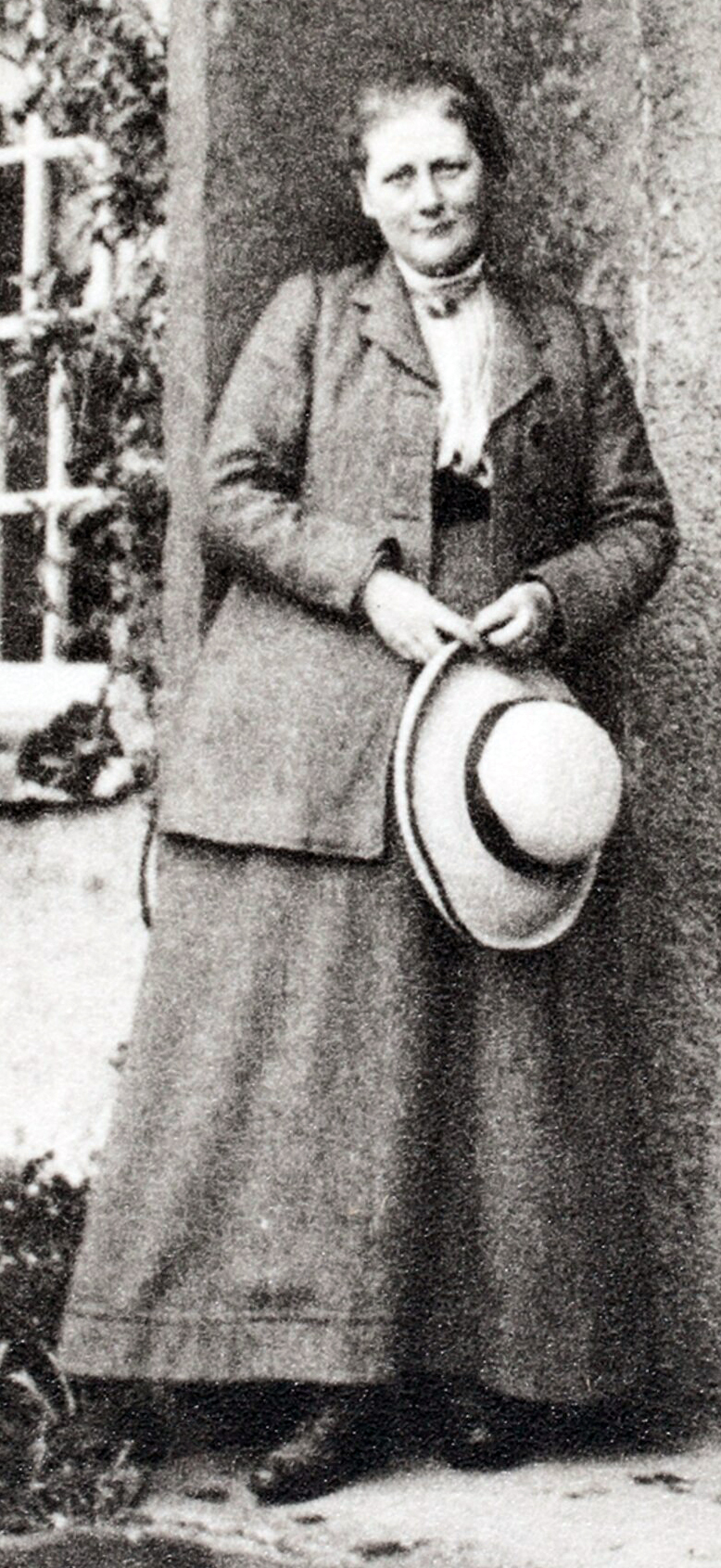
Children's book writer Beatrix Potter was among those who were enthusiastic about Seuss's first book.

Anne Carroll Moore, then in charge of the children's section at the New York Public Library, wrote an enthusiastic review in the Atlantic Monthly and invited Geisel to speak at the library. In her review she called the book "so completely spontaneous that the American child can take it to his heart on sight", and "as original in conception, as spontaneous in the rendering as it is true to the imagination of a small boy". Moore sent a copy of the book to English children's author Beatrix Potter, who wrote back, "What an amusing picture book ... I think it the cleverest book I have met with for many years. The swing and merriment of the pictures and the natural truthful simplicity of the untruthfulness ... Too many story books for children are condescending, self-conscious inventions—and then some trivial oversight, some small incorrect detail gives the whole show away. Dr. Seuss does it thoroughly!" Geisel himself was later critical of the book, saying on its 25th anniversary: "I think I was a little aloof, too outside there. It was written from the point of view of my mind, not the mind of a child".

While Mulberry Street's sales grew significantly as the Dr. Seuss brand became more famous, it is not one of Geisel's best-selling books. In 2012, on the occasion of the book's 75th anniversary, Michael Winerip argued that later Dr. Seuss books were more entertaining and inventive than Mulberry Street but that it is nevertheless important as a harbinger of the many books that followed. A. O. Scott, in a 2000 article in The New York Times, contradicted this view, calling the book "a hymn to the generative power of fantasy, a celebration of the sheer inventive pleasure of spinning an ordinary event into 'a story that no one can beat'".

== Analysis ==
=== Autobiographical elements and influences ===
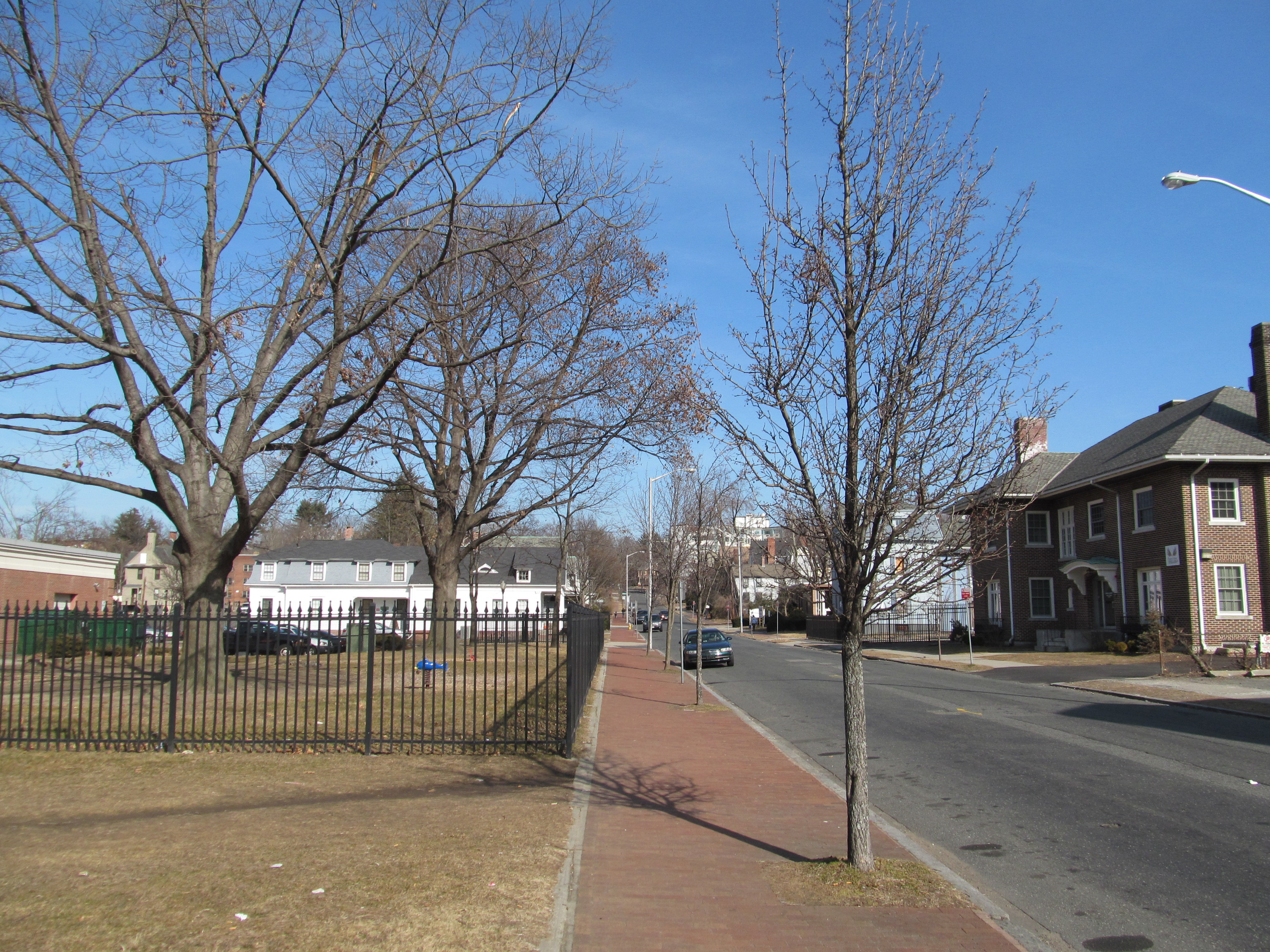
Geisel was likely thinking of the real-life Mulberry Street of the Springfield, Massachusetts of his youth.

Some writers have focused on Mulberry Street's connections to elements of Geisel's life, particularly his childhood in Springfield, Massachusetts. Geisel probably named the street in his story after a real-life Mulberry Street in Springfield. Guy McLain, director of the Springfield Museum, contends that Geisel may have chosen the street due to its proximity to a bakery owned by his grandparents, as well as the sound and rhythm of its name. Lewis Nichols, writing in 1962 on the occasion of the book's 25th anniversary, largely confirmed this view, writing that in the book's creation "there was no particular Mulberry Street in view, although there was one of the name in Springfield, Mass., where Mr. Geisel was born, and the subconscious may have taken him back". Other writers have pointed out that the motorcycles the policemen use to escort the parade in Mulberry Street resemble Indian motorcycles, which were manufactured in Springfield during Geisel's childhood. Cori Urban claimed that the mayor in the story resembles Fordis C. Parker, who was mayor of Springfield from 1925 to 1929.

Charles Cohen notes that, while the book mentions the intersection of Bliss and Mulberry Streets, their real-life counterparts in Springfield do not cross. Cohen connects the horse and wagon in Mulberry Street to Geisel's Springfield childhood and points to precursors of it in Geisel's earlier work. He traces the blue elephant in the book to the blue elephants that appear in Geisel's comic strip Hejji. Philip Nel acknowledges Mulberry Street as the start of Geisel's particular, distinctive verse style and theorizes that he may have learned "the narrative power of meter and rhyme" from books he read as a child, including The Hole Book by Peter Newell.

Jonathan Cott noted that Mulberry Street is similar to "Der Erlkönig", a German poem by Goethe, "for both of them are about a father and a son and about the exigencies and power of the imagination". When Cott told Geisel about this, Geisel responded by quoting the first two lines of the poem, in German. He also noted that he was raised in a German-speaking home, minored in German in college, and had memorized the poem while in high school.

Mary Galbraith makes a connection between Mulberry Street and Geisel's fears about the spread of Nazism. Geisel conceived of the story while returning from a European vacation that coincided with the 1936 Summer Olympics in Berlin, and Galbraith contends that in the book the "mayor's small mustache and raised arm evoke Hitler, while the brass band and international cast of characters evoke the parade of nations at the beginning of the games". She argues that the horse and wagon at the beginning of the story evokes the peaceful German Americans of Springfield, and by extension the non-threatening actions of Germany. As Marco's story evolves, the horse and wagon transform into a parade, which Galbraith equates with "a military monolith ... marching down main street as an airplane drops confetti".

=== Marco's relationship with his father ===
Some analyses have examined the relationship between Marco and his father. Alison Lurie asserts that Marco's factual reply to his father at the end of the story suggests to the book's young readers that "it is sometimes, perhaps always, best to conceal one's inner imaginative life from adults", a message that appears again in The Cat in the Hat. To Matthew Pierlot, "The father serves as an external check on the boy's tendency to abandon the truth", a Socrates-like figure who insists on intellectual integrity and thwarts Marco's desire to mold mundane reality into something more exciting than it is. To Patrick Shannon, "Marco escapes into his imagination to combat the insipid character and conformity of the adult world". In this sense, the book follows an individualist, child-centered trend in children's literature beginning in the mid-20th century, also seen in the works of Maurice Sendak and William Steig; this is in contrast to the norm in earlier children's books where the author tried to impart outside values on the child reader.

Pastoral theologian Herbert Anderson has written that the child's perspective of reality in Mulberry Street can be challenging and seem subversive to an adult. He argues that Marco's internal story of what happened on his walk was not dishonest or rebellious, but a natural "openness to constructing a world". The child's untruthful response that he had not seen anything interesting on Mulberry Street is not out of disrespect to the parent, but is Marco's attempt to reconcile his perspective with the authoritative, adult one of his father.

=== Verse style ===
Nel notes that Geisel makes heavy use of anapestic tetrameter in Mulberry Street and many of his later books, citing the rhythm and draw of the books' language as a main reason for their appeal. Thomas Fensch also notes the rollicking rhythm of the verse in Mulberry Street and Geisel's other books, writing: "Children can read the lines; they can sing the lines; they can SHOUT! the lines; they can dance to the lines". Fensch marks Mulberry Street as the start of what he calls "escalating sequences or escalating action", a technique Geisel used in most of his books, in which the action builds with each page. As Fensch put it: "The rhythm gallops—the pictures move from left to right, toward the next page and the action builds".

=== Artwork ===
Geisel's drawings formed a part of the narrative, bordering on the blending of text and image found in the much-denigrated comics medium. The artwork in children's literature before Geisel's appearance was much more restrained than Geisel's, and relegated to a lower status than the text it illustrated. By linking text and image, the book helps children follow the story even if they cannot read every word of the text. By encouraging children to explore the page, the drawings allow them to use their imaginations to fill in gaps in the text. The details shown in the pictures but not explained in the text creates a tension between them that leads the reader to think and imagine further. In the case of Mulberry Street, Philip Nel writes, readers might be moved to ask questions such as "Why is the elephant blue?" or "Where did the airplane come from?"

In bold colors Geisel illustrated the surreal scenery and strange human and animal characters of the book with the strong, loose, energetic line that remained familiar in his later works. Ruth MacDonald saw Geisel's drawing style as fully formed in Mulberry Street, arguing that only his page design improved in later books, better keeping children's attention without confusing them. Philip Nel found the artwork in Geisel's later books to have a greater energy and looseness than in Mulberry Street or his earlier cartooning. Nel felt Geisel began loosening up toward his classic style as early as Horton Hatches the Egg (1940) and reached fruition with 1950's If I Ran the Zoo (1950).

== Adaptations ==
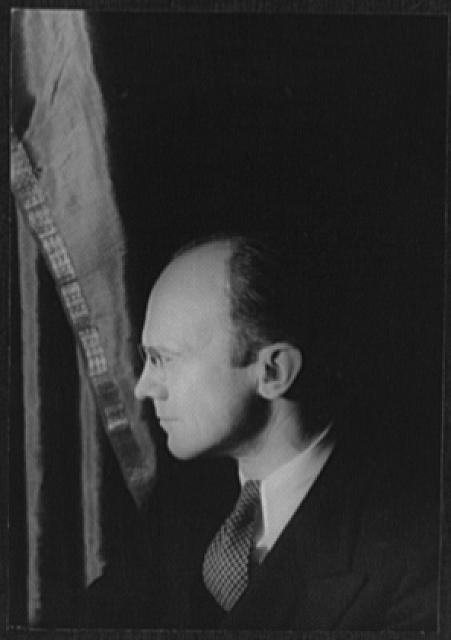
Deems Taylor (pictured) adapted Mulberry Street into an orchestral work, Marco Takes a Walk (1942).

Composer Deems Taylor adapted Mulberry Street into an orchestral work, Marco Takes a Walk. The work opens with a theme that represents the horse and wagon, which is followed by six variations that represent the various changes in Marco's story. The work's premiere, conducted by Howard Barlow, occurred at Carnegie Hall on November 14, 1942.

A short film based on the book was released by Paramount Pictures in 1944. It was made by George Pal as part of his Puppetoons series, which featured a film adaptation of Geisel's The 500 Hats of Bartholomew Cubbins the year before. The Mulberry Street adaptation was nominated for the Academy Award for Best Short Subject (Cartoon) in 1945. Footage of the short was featured in the 1994 TV film In Search of Dr. Seuss.

== Legacy ==
As Mulberry Street is Geisel's first children's book, Donald Pease calls it "the scene of origin for all of Dr. Seuss's children's books". After several books in prose, Geisel returned to verse for 1940's Horton Hatches the Egg, using the same "galloping, rollicking, anapestic tetrameter rhyme scheme" he had used for Mulberry Street. In a later series of children's stories for Redbook magazine, Geisel reported "the latest news from Mulberry Street". In "Marco Comes Late", Marco attempts to explain why he is two hours late to school.

Geisel returned to fictionalized versions of his home town in three later books, which, together with Mulberry Street, form what Donald Pease calls the Springfield Cycle. McElligot's Pool (1947), If I Ran the Zoo (1950), and If I Ran the Circus (1956) take place in different fictionalized versions of Springfield. Each also features a young protagonist who, when prompted by an adult, responds with "a series of increasingly fantastic scenarios". McElligot's Pool also marks Marco's return as a main character in a Dr. Seuss book.

When Geisel returned to Springfield in 1986 as part of a publicity tour, he was greeted by dozens of children on Mulberry Street. Another group of children held up a banner that read, "And to think that we saw him on Mulberry Street".

John Fogerty, frontman for the Creedence Clearwater Revival, has stated that the song "Lookin' Out My Back Door" was partly inspired by the book.

In October 2017, the Amazing World of Dr. Seuss Museum decided to remove a mural based on an illustration from Mulberry Street. This decision came after authors Mike Curato, Mo Willems, and Lisa Yee boycotted a museum event to protest the stereotypical Chinese figure in the mural.

== Withdrawal from publication ==
On March 2, 2021, Dr. Seuss Enterprises announced that it would cease publication of six Dr. Seuss titles, including Mulberry Street, citing that they "portray people in ways that hurtful and wrong". While the company did not specify which images prompted this decision, many news outlets speculated that Mulberry Street was withdrawn because of the stereotypical Chinese character. Also noted were illustrations of a "Rajah with rubies" and two fur-clad figures atop a reindeer-drawn sleigh.

== See also ==
- Mulberry (disambiguation)
- Mulberry Street (disambiguation)

== Sources ==
- Anderson, Herbert (August 2001). "Sense and Nonsense in the Wisdom of Dr. Seuss". New Theology Review.
- Anderson, Tanya (2011). Dr. Seuss (Theodor Geisel). Facts On File, Incorporated. ISBN 978-1-60413-750-7.
- Cohen, Charles (2004). The Seuss, the Whole Seuss, and Nothing But the Seuss: A Visual Biography of Theodor Seuss Geisel. Random House. ISBN 978-0-375-82248-3.
- Cott, Jonathan (1983). "The Good Dr. Seuss". In Fensch, Thomas (ed.). Of Sneetches and Whos and the Good Dr. Seuss: Essays on the Writings and Life of Theodor Geisel. McFarland & Company. pp. 99–123. ISBN 0-7864-0388-8.
- Fensch, Thomas (2001). The Man Who Was Dr. Seuss. Woodlands: New Century Books. ISBN 0-930751-11-6.
- Lurie, Alison (1992). "The Cabinet of Dr. Seuss". Popular Culture: An Introductory Text. Popular Press. pp. 68–80. ISBN 978-0-87972-572-3.
- Morgan, Neil; Morgan, Judith Giles (1996). Dr. Seuss & Mr. Geisel: A Biography. New York: Da Capo Press. ISBN 978-0-306-80736-7.
- Nel, Philip (2004). Dr. Seuss: American Icon. Continuum Publishing. ISBN 0-8264-1434-6.
- Nichols, Lewis (1962). "Then I Doodled a Tree". In Fensch, Thomas (ed.). Of Sneetches and Whos and the Good Dr. Seuss: Essays on the Writings and Life of Theodor Geisel. McFarland & Company. pp. 41–43. ISBN 0-7864-0388-8.
- Pease, Donald E. (2010). Theodor Seuss Geisel. Oxford University Press. ISBN 978-0-19-532302-3.
- Pierlot, Matthew F. (2011). "Socratic Seuss: Intellectual Integrity and Truth-Orientation". In Held, Jacob M. (ed.). Dr. Seuss and Philosophy: Oh, the Thinks You Can Think!. Rowman & Littlefield Publishers. pp. 41–52. ISBN 978-1-4422-0312-9.
- Rider, Benjamin (2011). "Oh, the Places You'll Go! The Examined, Happy Life". In Held, Jacob M. (ed.). Dr. Seuss and Philosophy: Oh, the Thinks You Can Think!. Rowman & Littlefield Publishers. pp. 1–14. ISBN 978-1-4422-0312-9.
- Shannon, Patrick (March 1986). "Hidden within the Pages: A Study of Social Perspective in Young Children's Favorite Books". The Reading Teacher. 39 (7). Wiley on behalf of the International Reading Association: 656–663. JSTOR 20199187.
- Thomas, Virginia; Miller, Betty Davis (1986). Children's Literature for All God's Children. Westminster John Knox Press. ISBN 978-0-8042-1690-6.
- Tunstall, Dwayne (2011). "Dr. Seuss Meets Philosophical Aesthetics". In Held, Jacob M. (ed.). Dr. Seuss and Philosophy: Oh, the Thinks You Can Think!. Rowman & Littlefield Publishers. pp. 219–230. ISBN 978-1-4422-0312-9.
- Weidt, Maryann N. (1994). Oh, the Places He Went: A Story about Dr. Seuss – Theodor Seuss Geisel. LernerClassroom. ISBN 978-0-87614-627-9.
