= Ames Hill/Crescent Hill District =

Historic district in Massachusetts, United States

- U.S. National Register of Historic Places
- U.S. Historic district
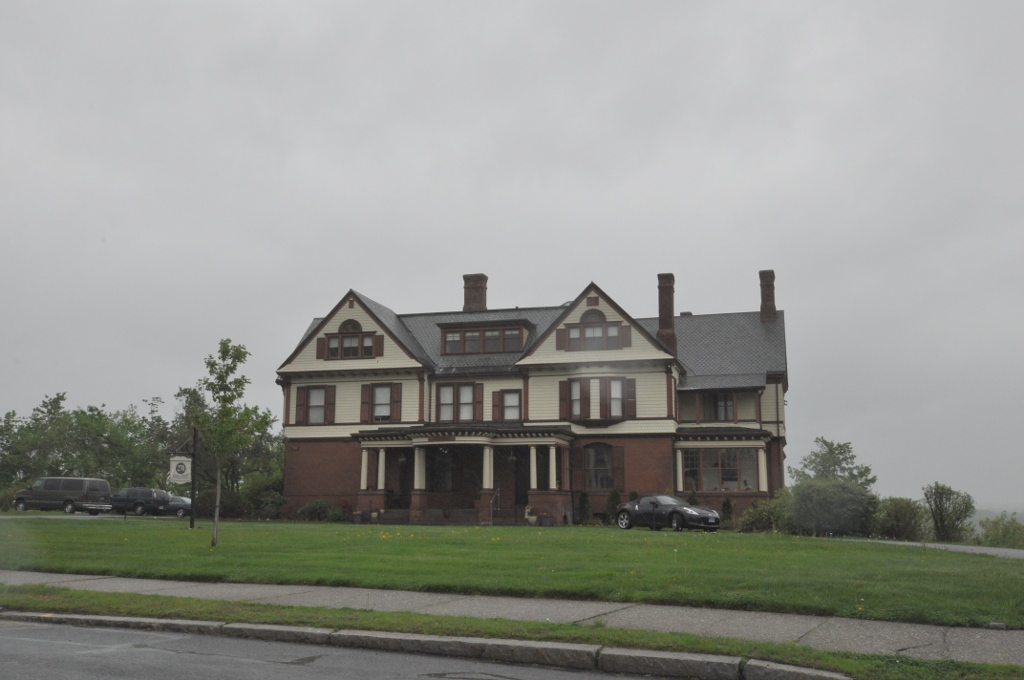

- Location within Massachusetts Location within the United States
- Location: Springfield, Massachusetts
- Coordinates: 42°5′24″N 72°34′37″W
- Built: 1812
- Architect: Multiple
- Architectural style: Mid 19th Century Revival, Late 19th And 20th Century Revivals, Late Victorian
- NRHP reference No.: 74000368
- Added to NRHP: May 1, 1974

Ames Hill/Crescent Hill District is an historic district in Springfield, Massachusetts, bounded by sections of Central, Maple, Mill, and Pine Streets, Crescent Hill, Ames Hill Drive, and Maple Court. This section of Springfield was the city's first "Gold Coast," built primarily during the early Industrial Revolution, from approximately 1812–1850. The Ames Hill/Crescent Hill Historic District includes Mulberry Street, the upper-class street made famous by Dr. Seuss's first children's book, And to Think That I Saw It on Mulberry Street, (1937.) Dr. Seuss's grandparents lived on Mulberry Street. This National Historic District overlaps somewhat with both the Ridgewood and Maple Hill Historic Districts designated by the City of Springfield.

Ames Hill was named for the Ames Family of Springfield. David Ames, Jr., a Springfield paper manufacturer, was the son of Colonel David Ames, the first superintendent of the Springfield Armory. The David Ames Jr. House, at 241 Maple Street, on Ames Hill in Springfield, was built in 1826-7 and was the work of Chauncey Shepard, a prominent local architect and builder. In 1867, Solomon J. Gordon, a New York City lawyer, purchased the property and Shepard was hired to remodel the house he had built forty-one years earlier. Gordon lived in the house until his death in 1891. Today the house is known as Young House and is part of the campus of the MacDuffie School.

Crescent Hill continues along the steep trajectory of Maple Street, which snakes up along a bluff overlooking the scenic Connecticut River and Connecticut River Valley. Crescent Hill also features many of Springfield's largest mansions, most of which date from the mid-19th century. Unfortunately, the Ames Hill/Crescent Hill Historic District was devastated during the June 1, 2011 Greater Springfield tornado.

== See also ==
- Mills-Stebbins Villa, within the district and separately listed on the NRHP
- National Register of Historic Places listings in Springfield, Massachusetts
- National Register of Historic Places listings in Hampden County, Massachusetts
