= Cubbins =

Cubbins is the family name of some fictional characters, including:

- Bartholomew Cubbins, the hero of two books by Dr. Seuss
- Potiphar Cubbins, a minor character created by Rudyard Kipling
