= You're Only Old Once! =

1986 picture book for adults by Dr. Seuss

- Author: Dr. Seuss
- Illustrator: Dr. Seuss
- Language: English
- Genre: Comedy
- Published: March 2, 1986
- Publisher: Random House
- Publication place: United States
- Media type: Print (hardcover and paperback)
- Preceded by: The Butter Battle Book
- Followed by: Oh, the Places You'll Go!

You're Only Old Once! A Book for Obsolete Children is a 1986 picture book for adults by Dr. Seuss, released on Geisel's 82nd birthday. It was his first book for adults in 47 years.

== Plot ==
The book follows an elderly man on a visit to the Golden Years Clinic, where he endures long waits and bizarre medical tests.

== Background ==
You're Only Old Once! was written shortly after Geisel had suffered through a series of illnesses, during which he spent a considerable amount of time in hospital waiting rooms. To pass the time, he began sketching images of hospital machines and scenes of medical procedures. He later began to work those ideas into a book. Geisel quipped that he was "fed up with a social life consisting entirely of doctors".

You're Only Old Once! was Seuss's first adult book since The Seven Lady Godivas, which was published in 1939. The Seven Lady Godivas sold fewer than 500 copies when it was first released, but You're Only Old Once! reached No. 1 on The New York Times Best Seller list, and remained on the list for over 60 weeks.

The book's subtitle, A Book for Obsolete Children refers to a quote by Dr. Seuss describing why he did not enjoy writing for adults. After the failure of The Seven Lady Godivas, Seuss said in an interview, "Adults are just obsolete children, and the hell with them".
