= Mulberry (disambiguation) =

Mulberry is the common name of several trees in the genus Morus. See the list of plants known as mulberry for plants with similar names.

Mulberry may also refer to:

== Geography ==
=== United Kingdom ===
- Mulberry, Cornwall, a hamlet

=== United States ===
- Mulberry, Arkansas, a city
- Mulberry, Florida, a city
- Mulberry, Georgia, a city in Gwinnett County
- Mulberry, Barrow County, Georgia, an unincorporated community
- Mulberry, Indiana, a town
- Mulberry, Kansas, a city
- Mulberry, Michigan, an unincorporated community
- Mulberry, Surry County, North Carolina, a census-designated place
- Mulberry, Wilkes County, North Carolina, a census-designated place
- Mulberry, Ohio, a census-designated place
- Mulberry, Oklahoma, a census-designated place
- Mulberry, South Carolina, a census-designated place
- Mulberry, Tennessee, an unincorporated community
- Mulberry, Texas, an unincorporated community in Fannin County
- Hopewell, Red River County, Texas, a former unincorporated community also known as Mulberry
- Praha, Texas, originally called Mulberry
- Mulberry Creek (disambiguation)
- Mulberry River (disambiguation)
- Mulberry Township (disambiguation)

== Arts and entertainment ==
- Mulberry (film), a 1986 Korean movie
- Mulberry (TV series), a British fantasy sitcom
- Mulberry, an artist on the video game Yandere Simulator
- "Mulberry", a song on the album Blueprint for a Sunrise by Yoko Ono

== Schools ==
- Mulberry UTC, a university technical college in Old Ford, London
- Mulberry School for Girls, a secondary comprehensive school and sixth form for girls in the London Borough of Tower Hamlets, England
- Mulberry High School (Arkansas), Mulberry, Arkansas, United States
- Mulberry High School (Mulberry, Florida), United States

== Historic landmarks ==
- Mulberry Plantation (James and Mary Boykin Chesnut House), Camden, South Carolina, United States, on the National Register of Historic Places and a National Historic Landmark
- Mulberry Plantation (Moncks Corner, South Carolina), on the National Register of Historic Places and a National Historic Landmark

== Other uses ==
- Mulberry (alloy), an alloy of uranium, niobium, and zirconium
- Mulberry (color), a shade of violet
- Mulberry (company), an English apparel manufacturer founded in 1971
- Mulberry (email client), communications software
- Mulberry Garden (Režný Újezd), a cottage garden in Režný Újezd, Czech Republic
- Mulberry Group, a British fashion company
- Mulberry harbour, prefabricated harbours built for the invasion of Normandy during World War II
- Mulberry Street (disambiguation)
- USS Mulberry (AN-27), a United States Navy net-laying ship

== See also ==
- Mulberry Hall, a Grade II* listed building in York, England
- Mulberry House, City of Westminster, London
- Mulberry Place, a building in London
- Mulberry Island, Newport News, Virginia, United States, a peninsula
