= Thidwick the Big-Hearted Moose =

Children's book by Dr. Seuss

- Author: Dr. Seuss
- Illustrator: Dr. Seuss
- Language: English
- Genre: Children's literature
- Publisher: Random House
- Publication date: 1948 (renewed in 1975)
- Publication place: United States
- Media type: Print (hardcover)
- Pages: 41 pages
- ISBN: 0-394-90086-3
- OCLC: 1386296
- Preceded by: McElligot's Pool
- Followed by: Bartholomew and the Oobleck

Thidwick the Big-Hearted Moose is a 1948 children's book by Dr. Seuss.

== Plot ==
Thidwick, a moose in a herd numbering approximately sixty who subsist mainly on moose-moss and live on the northern shore of Lake Winna-Bango, grants a small bug's request to ride on his antlers (referred to in the book as "horns") free of charge. The bug takes advantage of the moose's kindness and settles in as a permanent resident, inviting various other animals to live on the moose's antlers.

Thidwick acquiesces to the unexpected living arrangements, treating the animals as "guests" even though he never explicitly gave them permission to live there. His selfish passengers take advantage of his kindness, such as a woodpecker who drills holes in his antlers. The other moose give Thidwick an ultimatum: if he doesn't get rid of his guests then he will be forced to leave the herd.

Thidwick chooses to prioritize his guests' comfort over his own and the herd leaves him behind. Winter comes and the herd swims across the lake to find fresh supplies of moose-moss, but when Thidwick tries to do the same, his guests object to having their home moved. Remaining on the cold, northern shore of the lake, Thidwick faces starvation, while his guests continue inviting other animals to join them, including a 200 kg (440 lb) black bear.

A group of hunters spot Thidwick and pursue him, with the goal of shooting him and mounting his head on the wall of the Harvard Club of New York City. Thidwick attempts to outrun the hunters, but the heavy load prevents him from escaping. Just before his capture, however, Thidwick remembers that it is time for him to shed his antlers. At the last moment, he drops his antlers, makes a snide comment to his former guests, and escapes by swimming across the lake to rejoin his herd. His antlers end up mounted on the Harvard Club wall with the now-taxidermied guests still perched on them.

== Meaning ==
The story explores the limits of hospitality and sharing. Neil Reynolds has discussed it as a parable of immigration issues and the social welfare state. Aeon J. Skoble discusses Thidwick at length as an exemplification of the idea of property rights, and particularly of John Locke's formulation of property rights. Skoble argues that Thidwick is badly mistaken in viewing the other animals as "guests", and that the story demonstrates this. In a later essay in the same volume, Henry Cribbs makes a similar point, considering whether "Thidwick" is a case of squatter's rights. According to critic David Dempsey: "A man of less consistency than Seuss would have let Thidwick be rescued by the creatures he is befriending ... but Seuss' logic is rooted in principle, rather than sentiment, and the sponging animals get what they deserve. Incidentally, this is also what the child expects".

== Adaptations ==
- Welcome, a 1986 Soviet animated film
- Thidwick the Big-Hearted Moose, a 1992 direct-to-video short following Horton Hears a Who! (part of the “Dr. Seuss Video Classics” series by Random House Home Video.
- Thidwick the Big-Hearted Moose, an upcoming animated special set for release on Netflix.
