= Mulberry Fork River =

Mulberry Fork River can refer to:

- Mulberry Fork of the Black Warrior River in Alabama in the United States
- Mulberry Fork (Loop Creek), a tributary of Loop Creek in West Virginia

== See also ==
- Mulberry River (disambiguation)
- Mulberry River Bridge (disambiguation)
