= Mulberry Street =

Mulberry Street may refer to:

== Places ==
- Mulberry Street (Baltimore)
- Mulberry Street (Manhattan)
- Mulberry Street (Springfield, Massachusetts)
- Mulberry Street, Philadelphia, renamed Arch Street in 1854
- Mulberry Street Bridge, Harrisburg, Pennsylvania
- Mulberry Street (Boothwyn) Pennsylvania

== Arts and entertainment ==
- Mulberry Street (EP), by Cold War Kids, 2005
- Mulberry Street (film), a 2006 horror film
- "Mulberry Street", a song by Twenty One Pilots from Scaled and Icy, 2021

== See also ==
- And to Think That I Saw It on Mulberry Street (1937), Theodor Seuss Geisel's first children's book, published under the pen name Dr. Seuss
- "Big Man on Mulberry Street", a song by Billy Joel
- Mulberry (disambiguation)
