= Mulberry River =

Mulberry River may refer to any of several rivers:

- Mulberry River (Arkansas) in Arkansas
- Mulberry River (Georgia) in Georgia (U.S.)
- Mulberry Fork of the Black Warrior River in Alabama

== See also ==
- Mulberry (disambiguation)
- Mulberry Creek (disambiguation)
- Mulberry Fork River (disambiguation)
- Mulberry River Bridge (disambiguation)
