= Mills-Stebbins Villa =

Historic house in Massachusetts, United States

- U.S. National Register of Historic Places
- U.S. Historic district – Contributing property
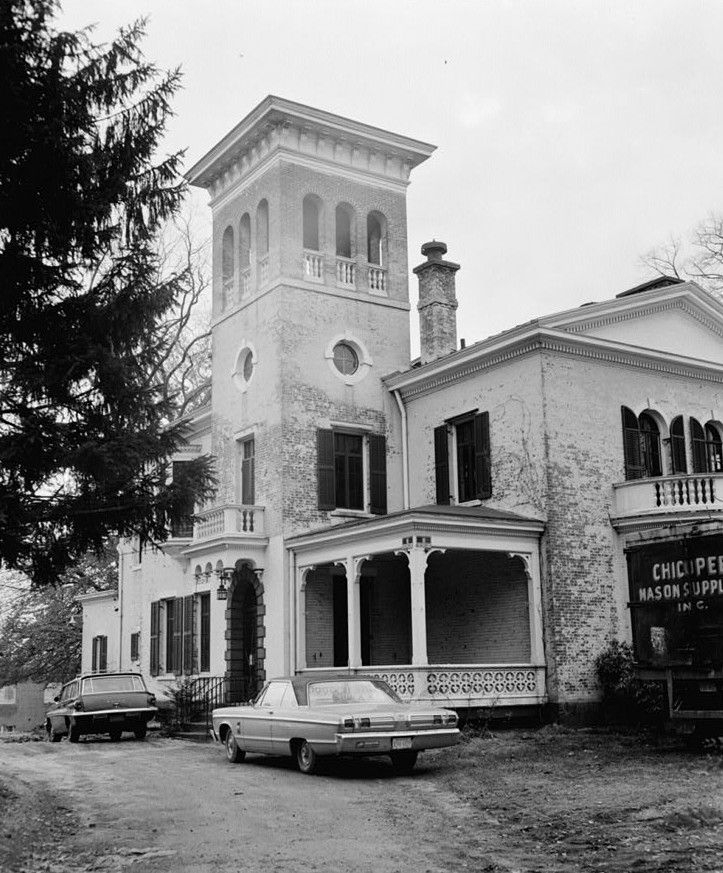

- Location within Massachusetts Location within the United States
- Location: Springfield, Massachusetts
- Coordinates: 42°5′27″N 72°34′41″W
- Built: 1849
- Architect: Henry A. Sykes
- Architectural style: Italian Villa
- Part of: Ames Hill/Crescent Hill District (ID74000368)
- NRHP reference No.: 73000299

Significant dates
- Added to NRHP: October 15, 1973
- Designated CP: May 1, 1974

The Mills-Stebbins Villa is a historic house at 3 Crescent Hill in Springfield, Massachusetts. Described as the "best work" of architect Henry A. Sykes, this Italian style villa was built between 1849 and 1851 for John Mills, a prominent Springfield attorney. Mills died in 1861, and the villa was acquired by John Stebbins, a banker, real estate developer, and local politician. It fell into decline in the 20th century, but was rehabilitated and restored in the early 1970s.

The villa is located at the top of a ridge that historically separated Springfield's downtown and working class South End from the more upscale Maple Street Hill area. It was built of brick that was probably once covered with a stucco-style mastic. The most prominent architectural feature is a tower at the front of the house that echoes the style of an Italian Renaissance campanile. The massing of the building falls away in successive stages. The brickwork is relieved by stone and wood detailing, and there are a few unusual windows on the front facade. A service wing was added to the rear of the house c. 1900.

Inside the building, the formal rooms of the house were on the north side, while the central part of the house contains the bedrooms and a library. The service wing added space for a nursery on the south side. A number of rooms included full-length windows that provided access to outdoor spaces, including a patio area on the north side as well as several balconies.

The villa was listed on the National Register of Historic Places in 1973, and included as a contributing property to the Ames Hill/Crescent Hill District in 1974.

== See also ==
- National Register of Historic Places listings in Springfield, Massachusetts
- National Register of Historic Places listings in Hampden County, Massachusetts
