= Bartholomew and the Oobleck =

Dr. Seuss book published in 1949

- Author: Dr. Seuss
- Illustrator: Dr. Seuss
- Language: English
- Genre: Children's literature
- Publisher: Random House
- Publication date: 1949 (renewed in 1976)
- Publication place: United States
- Media type: Print (hardcover)
- Pages: 48 pages
- ISBN: 0-394-80075-3
- Preceded by: Thidwick the Big-Hearted Moose
- Followed by: If I Ran the Zoo

Bartholomew and the Oobleck is a 1949 children's book by Theodor Geisel, writing under his pseudonym of Dr. Seuss. It follows the adventures of a young boy named Bartholomew Cubbins, a page boy who must rescue his kingdom from a sticky green substance called Oobleck. The book is a sequel of sorts to The 500 Hats of Bartholomew Cubbins. Unlike most of Seuss's books, which are written in anapestic tetrameter, (but like 500 Hats) Bartholomew and the Oobleck is a prose work.

Geisel said he drew inspiration for the book when he was stationed in Belgium during World War II. At one point, during a rainstorm, he overheard a conversation between some of the other soldiers in his regiment, during which one of them lamented, "Rain, always rain. Why can't we have something different for a change?"

The book was named a Caldecott Honor Book in 1950.

== Plot ==
The book opens with an explanation of how people in the Kingdom of Didd still talk about "the year the King got angry with the sky". Throughout the year, the king of Didd, Theobald Thindner Derwin, gets angry at rain in spring, sun in summer, fog in autumn, and snow in winter because he wants something new to come down from the sky, but his personal advisor and page boy, Bartholomew Cubbins, is a bit too uncomfortable to agree with it. The king gets the idea that he can rule the sky, being the king, and he orders Bartholomew to summon the Royal Magicians, who announce that they can make a substance called Oobleck, which will not look anything at all like the regular weather. That evening, the magicians make the substance at their cave at Mystic Mountain Neeka-tave and release it into the atmosphere.

The next morning, the Oobleck starts falling from the sky. When the King sees it, he is overjoyed. He declares the day a holiday and orders Bartholomew to tell the Royal Bell Ringer to announce the occasion, but the bell will not ring; the Oobleck turns out to be both gelatinous and adhesive, and it has gummed up the bell. When Bartholomew sees a robin trapped and paralyzed in her nest by the Oobleck, he decides to warn the kingdom. The Royal Trumpeter tries to sound the alarm, but gets his hand stuck in his horn while pulling a blockage of Oobleck from it. Bartholomew tells the Captain of the Guards to warn the kingdom, but the captain, determined to prove that he's not afraid of the Oobleck, scoops some up with his sword and eats it, only to get his mouth stuck and breathe out sticky green bubbles. In the meantime, the Oobleck is falling in larger quantities than before, and is now threatening to flood the kingdom. Soon, it starts spilling into the palace as well, and pretty soon, no matter how Bartholomew tries to warn them, everybody is stuck to it and flopping about in the goo. So Bartholomew decides to ask the king for advice to save the Kingdom of Didd from the falling Oobleck.

In the throne room, the king, now covered in Oobleck, orders Bartholomew to summon the magicians to stop the storm of gooey Oobleck, but Bartholomew delivers the bad news that "their cave on Mountain Neeka-tave is buried deep in Oobleck". The king gets the idea to use the magicians' magic words "Shuffle Duffle Muzzle Muff" (but there are more unknown words) to stop the Oobleck, but he cannot remember the whole incantation, and, in any case, he is not a magician. A much-more confident Bartholomew scolds the king for ignoring him in favor of the falling Oobleck and making such a foolish wish, and he tells him to apologize for the mess his wish has caused. The king is reluctant at first, but belts out a tearful apology after Bartholomew tells him he's "no sort of king at all" if he and his subjects are drowning in Oobleck and he won't own up to his mistakes. Immediately after the king says those simple words in tears and sobs, "I'm Sorry", the Oobleck storm disappears and the sun melts away all the green slime. The king rings the bell proclaiming the day a holiday, honored not to Oobleck, but honored to rain, sun, fog, and snow—the four things that have always come down from the sky. After that, Bartholomew is hailed a hero for saving the kingdom, with the help of the king.

A version recorded by the actor Marvin Miller for RCA Records in 1959 and dramatized by Seuss himself varies slightly from the book: the king first encounters the Oobleck in his royal bathtub when it comes out of the water faucet, which causes him to become stuck. Also, Bartholomew encounters Gussie, the royal cook, who is in panic with what he sees. The album from which the recording is part was nominated for the 1961 Grammy Award for Best Children's Album.

== Influence ==
A non-Newtonian fluid was named after the Oobleck in this book.

The web-series RWBY has a character called Dr. Bartholomew Oobleck, who is forenamed after Bartholomew and surnamed after the Oobleck.

An Israeli rock-opera for children, Gedaliyahu ve-ha-mistuk (1982), composed by Gary Ekstein, is based on the book.
