= The King's Stilts =

1939 book by Dr. Seuss

- Author: Dr. Seuss
- Cover artist: Dr. Seuss
- Language: English
- Genre: Children's literature
- Publisher: Random House
- Publication date: 1939 (renewed in 1967)
- Publication place: United States
- Media type: Print (hardcover)
- Pages: 56 pages
- OCLC: 470371
- Preceded by: The 500 Hats of Bartholomew Cubbins
- Followed by: The Seven Lady Godivas

The King's Stilts is a children's book written and illustrated by Theodor Geisel, under the pen name Dr. Seuss, and first published in 1939 by Random House. Unlike many Dr. Seuss books, it is narrated in prose rather than verse.

== Plot ==
The King's Stilts tells the story of King Birtram of Binn, who dedicates himself to safeguarding his kingdom, a low-lying land surrounded by high water that is held back by a ring of dike trees, who are the favorite food of a species of pest-birds called nizzards; the kingdom always faces the risk that the nizzards might compromise the dike-tree barrier and cause catastrophic flooding. The King's administration maintains a legion of Patrol Cats to keep the nizzards at bay; King Birtram sees to their care personally. When not attending to his royal duties, the King enjoys himself by frolicking in the streets on his red stilts, which most of his subjects note with amused acceptance.

One day, his minister Lord Droon, secretly a gloomy scoundrel who despises his King cavorting with such undignified happiness, plots to capture the stilts, persuading the King's page boy Eric to steal and hide the stilts. Deprived of his amusement, the King grows depressed and begins to neglect his duties. As a result, the Patrol Cats become less vigilant, and soon the nizzards make headway in eating away the dike trees. Seeing the results of his actions, Eric resolves to return the stilts to the King and succeeds in doing so despite Lord Droon's efforts to stop him. King Birtram, his personal morale restored, finds the energy to mobilize the Patrol Cats to fight off the nizzards and save the kingdom. Lord Droon is arrested and punished with a restricted diet consisting entirely of nizzard cooked in various ways. Eric is rewarded with his own pair of red stilts, and joins the King on his outings.

== Publication and reception ==
The King's Stilts was published in 1939, as Geisel's second book for Random House and his fourth book overall. Although it was considerably more successful than his subsequent book, The Seven Lady Godivas, its sales were still a disappointment: 4,648 copies were sold in 1939 and 394 in 1940.
