= Welcome (1986 film) =

- Directed by: Alexei Karayev
- Screenplay by: Yury Iosifovich Koval
- Based on: Thidwick the Big-Hearted Moose by Dr. Seuss
- Production companies: Sverdlovsk television studio Gosteleradio
- Release dates: December 25, 1986 (Russia); March 14, 1987 (USA)
- Running time: 10 minutes
- Country: Soviet Union

Welcome (Russian: Добро пожаловать) is a 1986 Soviet paint-on-glass-animated 10-minute film adapted from the 1948 children's book by Dr. Seuss Thidwick the Big-Hearted Moose. It is a coproduction of Sverdlovsk television studio and Gosteleradio.

Released in 1986, the film went on to win the Grand Prix at the Ottawa International Animation Festival in 1988 and in Los Angeles. Although the visual style is quite different, the story is mostly the same with the exception of some subtle changes — for example, the moose isn't shown rejoining his herd at the end and the squatter animals aren't stuffed and mounted. Also, none of the animals are ever named and there is no narrator. A turtle, a fox, fleas and 362 bees are absent from the moose's antlers in this film. The "bingle bug" from the original book is shown as a Colorado potato beetle. The film was directed by Alexei Karayev. The art director was Aleksandr Petrov, who would later win an Oscar for his 1999 film The Old Man and the Sea. The screenplay was written by Yury Iosifovich Koval.

== Plot ==
A kind-hearted moose wandering through the forest agrees to give a ride to a Colorado beetle on his antlers. Soon, a spider joins, followed by birds, an entire family of squirrels, and even a bear. The "guests" settle into his antlers, making themselves at home and forgetting that they don’t own the space. When the moose tries to cross to the other side of the river, they refuse to let him go. Suddenly, shots ring out, and the moose flees in panic, inadvertently saving his passengers in the process. Grateful, the animals pledge their loyalty, vowing never to leave him. Just then, the moose’s antlers fall off—as he had forgotten it was time to shed them. The stunned "guests" watch the moose as he walks away, muttering, "Well, that was rather awkward."
