= Mulberry River Bridge =

Mulberry River Bridge may refer to:

- Mulberry River Bridge (Pleasant Hill, Arkansas), listed on the NRHP in Arkansas
- Mulberry River Bridge (Turner's Bend, Arkansas), listed on the NRHP in Arkansas

== See also ==
- Mulberry River (disambiguation)
- Mulberry Fork River (disambiguation)
