= The Seven Lady Godivas =

1939 book by Dr. Seuss

The Seven Lady Godivas: The True Facts Concerning History's Barest Family
- The cover of the 1987 reprinting.
- Author: Dr. Seuss
- Language: English
- Publisher: Random House
- Publication date: 31 December 1939
- Publication place: United States
- Media type: Print (hardcover)
- Pages: 80
- OCLC: 214392880
- Preceded by: The King's Stilts
- Followed by: Horton Hatches the Egg

The Seven Lady Godivas: The True Facts Concerning History's Barest Family is a picture book of the tale of Lady Godiva, written and illustrated by Dr. Seuss. One of Seuss's few books written for adults, its original 1939 publication by Random House was a failure and was eventually remaindered. However, it later gained popularity as Seuss himself grew in fame, and was republished in 1987 by "multitudinous demand".

== Plot overview ==
The book recounts in prose the tale of seven Godiva sisters, none of whom ever wear clothing. The explanation for their nakedness, even when walking in snow, is that "they were simply themselves and chose not to disguise it".

The story opens with the sisters' father, Lord Godiva, deciding to leave for the Battle of Hastings (1066) on horseback. This upsets the sisters, as horses are wild and untamed animals. Sure enough, before Lord Godiva even manages to leave the castle walls, he is flung from his horse and killed. As a tribute to their father's fate, the Godiva sisters agree to never marry—despite the fact that each is courting one of seven brothers named Peeping—until they can warn their countrymen of the dangers of horses. The book then follows the sisters as they set out on individual quests for "horse truths", which turn out to be well-known sayings involving horses.

== Publication history ==
Seuss reportedly had misgivings about The Seven Lady Godivas before its publication; the drawing on the endpaper contains a small bucket of sap labeled "Bennett Cerf", the name of Seuss's publisher at Random House. Seuss, by calling Cerf a sap, was apparently implying that Cerf was being too nice in allowing the book to be published. The initial 1939 publishing had a print run of 10,000 copies, but only around 2,500 sold (one authority states that only 50 were sold). Seuss himself called it his "greatest failure" and "a book that nobody bought". To another interviewer he said: "It was all full of naked women, and I can't draw convincing naked women. I put their knees in the wrong places". It became one of only two Dr Seuss books, along with The Cat in the Hat Songbook, to be allowed to go out of print prior to 2021. The remaining copies were remaindered in the chain of Schulte's Cigar Stores for twenty-five cents, though original editions now have been reported as selling at prices as high as $300.

The book's initial failure has been attributed to several factors: at two dollars, it was priced relatively high for the Great Depression era. Also, the book's depiction of nudity, though it was intended for adults and was very restrained, led to cold reception.

In 1974, Carolyn See wrote in Esquire that "America was feeling too blue to be cheered up by pictures of silly ladies". Seuss said he tried to draw "the sexiest-looking women" he could, but they "came out just ridiculous".

The failure of The Seven Lady Godivas, Seuss's fourth book, may well have led to his subsequent immersion into the world of children's literature. He stated that he would "rather write for kids", who were more appreciative, and was no longer interested in writing for adults. Indeed, his general contempt for adults is evident in his oft-repeated quote: "Adults are obsolete children, and the hell with them". When he eventually did publish a second book aimed at adults (You're Only Old Once!, in 1986), it was subtitled A Book for Obsolete Children.
