= On Beyond Zebra! =

1955 book by Dr. Seuss

- Author: Dr. Seuss
- Language: English
- Genre: Children's literature
- Publisher: Random House
- Publication date: May 9th, 1955 (renewed in 1983)
- Publication place: United States
- Media type: Print (hardcover and paperback)
- OCLC: 7715159
- Preceded by: Horton Hears a Who!
- Followed by: If I Ran the Circus

On Beyond Zebra! is a 1955 illustrated children's book by Theodor Geisel, better known as Dr. Seuss. In this take on the genre of alphabet book, Seuss presents, instead of the twenty-six letters of the conventional English alphabet, twenty additional letters that purportedly follow them.

== Plot ==
The young narrator, not content with the confines of the ordinary alphabet, reports on additional letters beyond Z, with a fantastic creature corresponding to each new letter. For example, the letter "FLOOB" is the first letter in Floob-Boober-Bab-Boober-Bubs, which have large buoyant heads and float serenely in the water.

In order, the letters, followed by the creatures for which the letters are the first letter when spelling their names, are YUZZ (Yuzz-a-ma-Tuzz), WUM (Wumbus), UM (Umbus), HUMPF (Humpf-Humpf-a-Dumpfer), FUDDLE (Miss Fuddle-dee-Duddle), GLIKK (Glikker), NUH (Nutches), SNEE (Sneedle), QUAN (Quandary), THNAD (Thnadners), SPAZZ (Spazzim), FLOOB (Floob-Boober-Bab-Boober-Bubs), ZATZ (Zatz-it), JOGG (Jogg-oons), FLUNN (Flunnel), ITCH (Itch-a-pods), YEKK (Yekko), VROO (Vrooms), and HI! (High Gargel-orum).

The book ends with an unnamed letter that is substantially more complicated than those with names. A list of all the additional letters is shown at the end.

== Analysis ==
Image of the imaginary letters in On Beyond Zebra! as rendered in Constructium typeface.

Judith and Neil Morgan, Geisel's biographers, note that most of the letters resemble elaborate monograms, "perhaps in Old Persian", though they are clearly Latin. These letters are not officially encoded in Unicode, but the independent ConScript Unicode Registry provides an unofficial assignment of code points in the Unicode Private Use Area for them.

== Legacy ==
Some of the animals from On Beyond Zebra! appear in the 1975 CBS TV Special The Hoober-Bloob Highway. In this segment, Hoober-Bloob explains that babies don't have to be humans if they don't choose to be, so he shows them a variety of different animals, including ones from On Beyond Zebra! and If I Ran the Zoo (1950). Such animals include a Jogg-oon, a Sneedle, a Zatz-it, a Wumbus, and a Yekko. The book was infrequently reprinted. Open Library lists American editions in 1955, 1983, and 1999. A British edition was published in 2012.

== Withdrawal from publication ==
On March 2, 2021, Dr. Seuss Enterprises announced that it would stop publishing of On Beyond Zebra! in addition to five other Dr. Seuss titles, stating they contained imagery that was "hurtful and wrong". Many news outlets speculated that the withdrawal of On Beyond Zebra! was due to the character of "the Nazzim of Bazzim", who was interpreted as drawing on negative stereotypes of Middle Eastern people. The Vancouver Sun called this "probably the least obvious" of the offending imagery. Kyle Smith of the National Review described the Nazzim as "a proud-looking camel-riding Arab nobleman", arguing that "only the most hypersensitive hysteric" would take offense to such an image.

== Sources ==
- Fensch, Thomas (2001). The Man Who Was Dr. Seuss. Woodlands: New Century Books. ISBN 0-930751-11-6.
- MacDonald, Ruth (1988). Dr. Seuss. Twayne Publishers. ISBN 0-8057-7524-2.
- Morgan, Neil; Morgan, Judith Giles (1996). Dr. Seuss Mr. Geisel: a biography. New York: Da Capo Press. ISBN 978-0-306-80736-7.
- Nel, Philip (2004). Dr. Seuss: American Icon. Continuum Publishing. ISBN 0-8264-1434-6.
- Pease, Donald E. (2010). Theodor Seuss Geisel. Oxford University Press. ISBN 978-0-19-532302-3.
