= Mulberry Creek =

Mulberry Creek may refer to a waterway in the United States:

- Mulberry Creek (Alabama River), a tributary of the Alabama River in Alabama
- Mulberry Creek (Tennessee River), a tributary of the Tennessee River in Alabama
- Mulberry River (Arkansas), a tributary of the Arkansas River, alternately named "Mulberry Creek"
- Mulberry Creek (Chattahoochee River tributary), a stream in Georgia
- Mulberry Creek (Current River), a stream in Missouri
- Mulberry Creek (Marais des Cygnes River), a stream in Missouri
- Mulberry Creek (Red River), a tributary of the Red River in Texas

== See also ==
- Mulberry River (disambiguation)
