= The Hole Book =

1908 picture book by Peter Newell

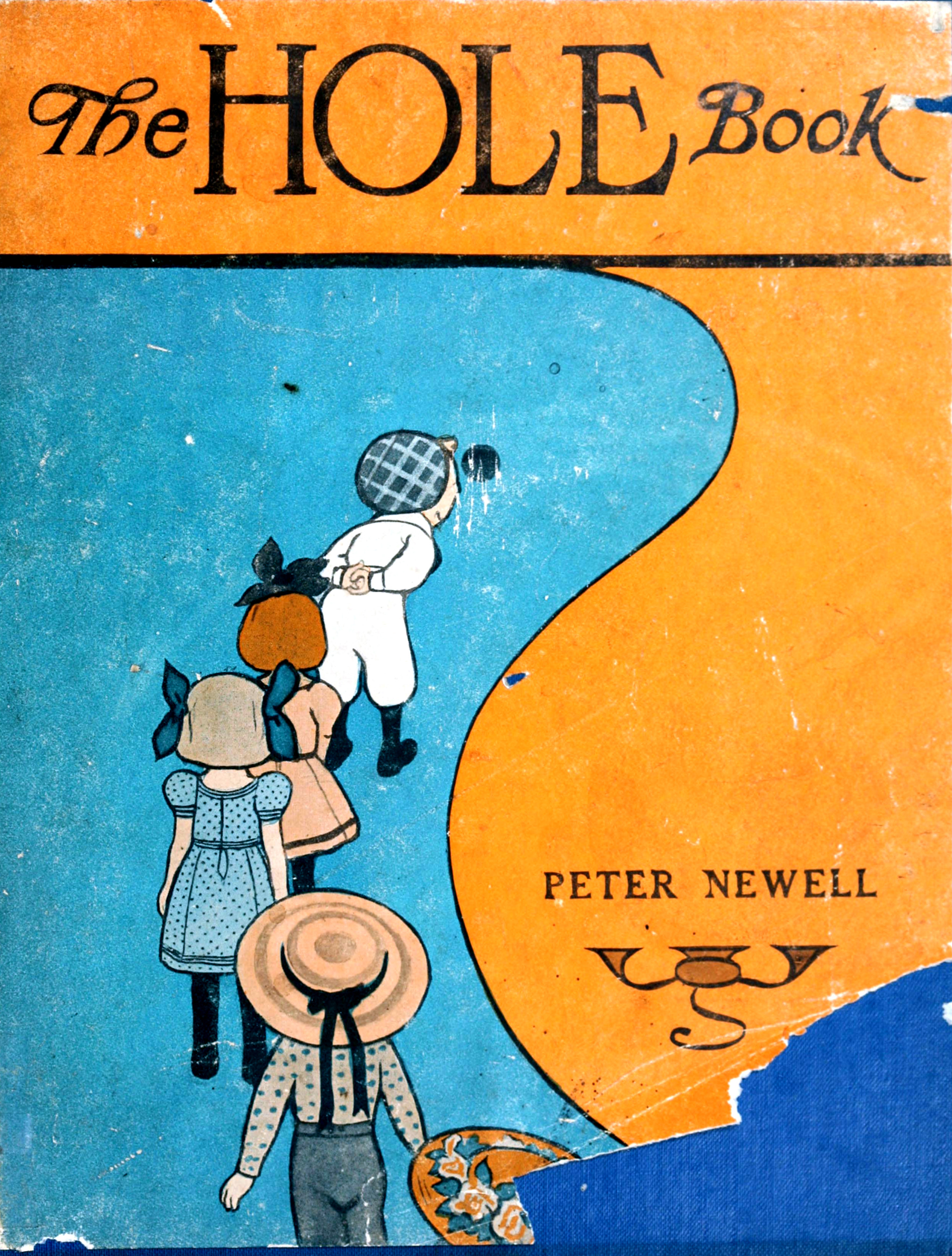
- Author: Peter Newell
- Publisher: Harper & Brothers
- Publication date: 1908
- Pages: 30

The Hole Book is a 1908 picture book by the artist Peter Newell. The story follows an accidentally-fired bullet as it travels through various scenes and objects in a town. The physical book features a literal, die-cut hole on each page, which is incorporated into the illustrations of havoc wreaked along bullet's path. The Hole Book is remembered as one of Newell's novelty picture book innovations, appearing decades before pop-up books became commonplace.

== About ==
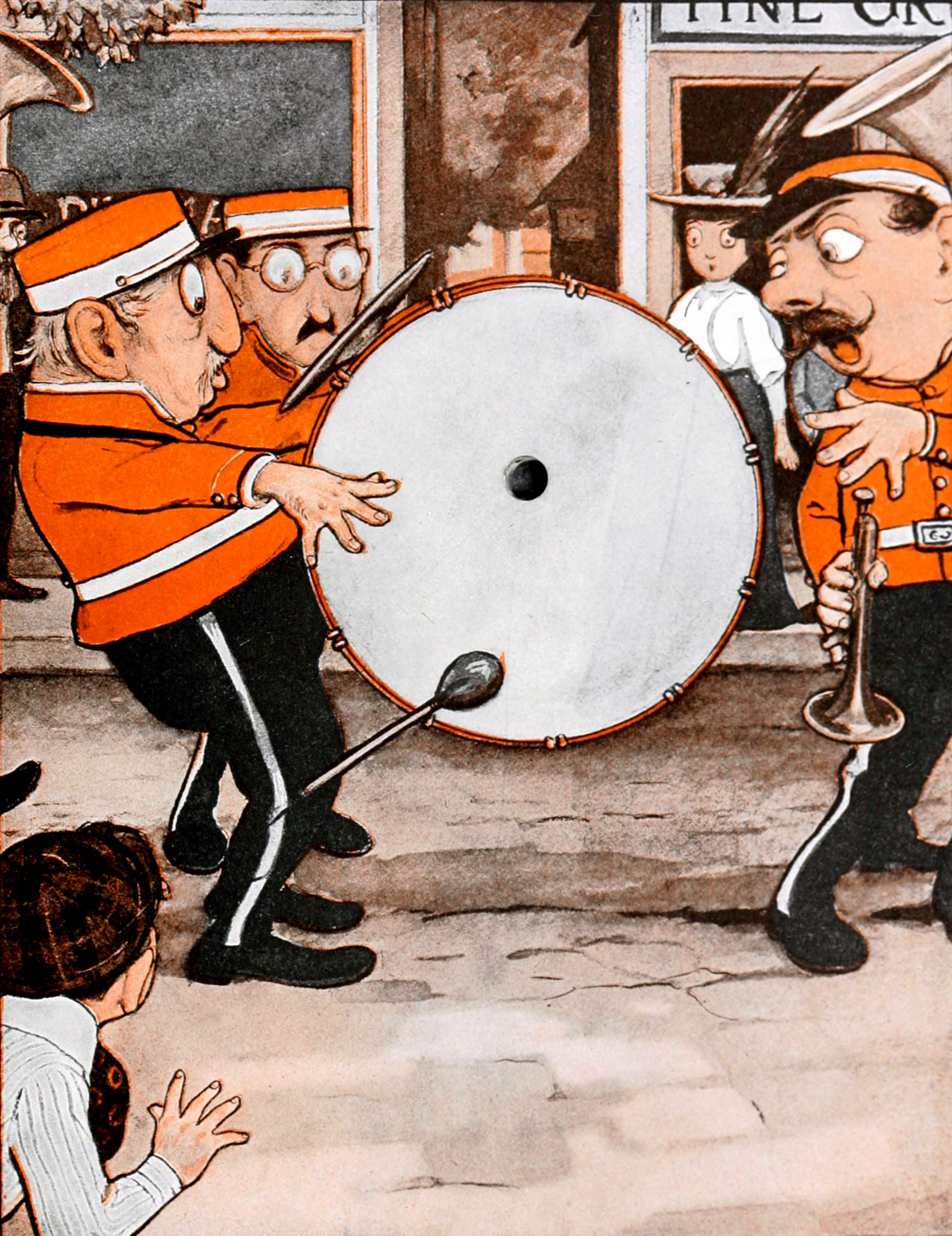
A page in The Hole Book

The book features scenes of a shot traveling through a town, leaving holes in items including a policeman’s hat and a donut, deflating a set of bagpipes, and causing other scenes of mayhem. Within each illustration is an actual physical hole that has been punched through the pages. The book is noted for the whimsical, unconventional gimmick, and has been identified as the pioneer of die-cut holes in picture book pages.

Several ethnic and racial caricatures appears throughout the story, including a black woman shown with a watermelon and called "mammy". Rhythmic verse with an ABAB rhyming structure accompany the illustrations.

Newell's novel die-cut hole concept was an innovation in children's literature, and influenced later artists including Bruno Munari and Jan Pieńkowski. Dr. Seuss read The Hole Book as a child and was likely influenced by its style and novelty. In 2013, Norwegian illustrator Øyvind Torseter published a similar picture book punched with a die-cut hole called The Hole.

Newell was a pioneer of many new novelty picture book concepts, Topsy & Turvy (1893) which could be read upside down and The Slant Book (1910) shaped like a rhombus to symbolize the a hill.
