= McElligot's Pool =

1947 children's book by Dr. Seuss

- The front cover of McElligot's Pool, designed by Dr. Seuss
- Author: Dr. Seuss
- Illustrator: Dr. Seuss
- Language: English
- Publisher: Random House
- Publication date: 1947 (renewed in 1974)
- Publication place: United States
- Media type: Print
- Pages: 64 pages
- ISBN: 978-0-394-80083-7
- Preceded by: Horton Hatches the Egg
- Followed by: Thidwick the Big-Hearted Moose

McElligot's Pool is a children's book written and illustrated by Theodor Geisel under the pen name Dr. Seuss and published by Random House in 1947. In the story, a boy named Marco, who first appeared in Geisel's 1937 book And to Think That I Saw It on Mulberry Street, imagines a wide variety of fantastic fish that could be swimming in the pond in which he is fishing. It later became one of the Seuss books featured in the Broadway musical Seussical where its story is used for the song "It's Possible".

== Plot ==
The story begins with a boy named Marco fishing in a small, trash-filled pond known as McElligot's Pool. A local farmer laughs at the boy and tells him that he will never be able to catch anything. Nevertheless, Marco holds out hope and begins to imagine a scenario in which he might be able to catch a fish.

First, he suggests that the pool might be fed by an underground brook that travels under a highway and a hotel to reach the sea. Marco then imagines a succession of fish and other creatures that he might catch in the sea and therefore the pool. He imagines, among others, a fish with a checkerboard stomach, a dogfish, some catfish, a seahorse with the head of an actual horse, a cowfish with the head of an actual cow, an eel with two heads. When Marco is done imagining, he tells the farmer, "Oh, the sea is so full of a number of fish, if a fellow is patient, he might get his wish!"

== Creation ==
McElligot's Pool was the first Seuss book to feature watercolor illustrations, some of which Geisel painted while vacationing in Southern California. Due to budget constraints, Random House published half the book in color and half in black and white, alternating two spreads of each.

Geisel dedicated the book to his father, whom the dedication refers to as "the World's Greatest Authority on Blackfish, Fiddler Crabs, and Deegel Trout". According to Dr. Seuss biographers Judith and Neil Morgan, "deegel trout" was a private joke between Geisel and his father that was started during a fishing trip when Geisel was a boy. His father had bought large trout from Deegel hatchery and pretended that they had caught them.

== Reception ==
McElligot's Pool, Geisel's first book in seven years, was published by Random House in 1947 and was well received. It became a Junior Literary Guild selection and garnered Geisel his first Caldecott Honor.

The review in the Saturday Review of Literature stated: "Children will have nothing but admiration for this boy who heard there were no fish in McElligot's Pool and then saw them swimming in from the sea". M.B. King of the Chicago Sun emphasized the book's humor: "This time prepare to chuckle under water for you'll be meeting the weirdest, wildest, funniest creatures of the sea which imagination can conjur". S.J. Johnson of Library Journal called the book "as divinely idiotic" as Dr. Seuss' earlier title And to Think That I Saw It on Mulberry Street.

American trade editions of the book were printed in 1947, 1974, 1975, and 1992, and a library edition was printed in 1999.

== Withdrawal from publication ==
On March 2, 2021, Dr. Seuss Enterprises withdrew McElligot's Pool and five other books from publication because they "portray people in ways that are hurtful and wrong". One instance in the book uses the word "Eskimo", now considered a derogatory ethnic label, as a descriptor for a type of imagined fish that might swim from the North Pole to McElligot's Pool. The accompanying illustration depicts a group of these fish wearing hooded fur parkas.

== Sources ==
- Fensch, Thomas (2001). The Man Who Was Dr. Seuss. Woodlands: New Century Books. ISBN 0-930751-11-6.
- MacDonald, Ruth (1988). Dr. Seuss. Twayne Publishers. ISBN 0-8057-7524-2.
- Morgan, Neil; Morgan, Judith Giles (1996). Dr. Seuss Mr. Geisel: a biography. New York: Da Capo Press. ISBN 978-0-306-80736-7.
- Nel, Philip (2004). Dr. Seuss: American Icon. Continuum Publishing. ISBN 0-8264-1434-6.
- Pease, Donald E. (2010). Theodor Seuss Geisel. Oxford University Press. ISBN 978-0-19-532302-3.

== See also ==
- One Fish Two Fish Red Fish Blue Fish
