= If I Ran the Circus =

1956 book by Dr. Seuss

- First edition cover
- Author: Dr. Seuss
- Language: English
- Genre: Children's literature
- Publisher: Random House
- Publication date: 1956 (renewed 1984)
- Publication place: United States
- Media type: Print (hardcover and paperback)
- Pages: 65
- OCLC: 471685
- Preceded by: On Beyond Zebra!
- Followed by: The Cat in the Hat

If I Ran the Circus is a children's book by Dr. Seuss, published in 1956 by Random House.

Like The Cat in the Hat, or the more political Yertle the Turtle, If I Ran the Circus develops a theme of cumulative fantasy leading to excess. The overt social commentary found in the Sneetches and the Zax demonstrates that Dr. Seuss was fascinated by the errors and excesses to which humans are prone, and If I Ran the Circus also examines this interest, though more subtly and comically, given its earlier genesis. It is the second and final book of the If I Ran the... book franchise, following If I Ran the Zoo.

== Plot overview ==
Behind Mr. Sneelock's ramshackle store, there is an empty lot. Young Morris McGurk is convinced that if he could just clear out the rusty cans, the dead tree, and the old cars, nothing would prevent him from using the lot for the amazing, world-beating, Circus McGurkus. The more elaborate Morris' dreams about the circus become, the more they depend on the sleepy-looking, innocent pipe-smoking Sneelock who stands outside his ramshackle store, oblivious to the fate that awaits him in the depths of Morris's imagination.

Sneelock does not yet know that he will have to dispense 500 gallons of lemonade, be lassoed by a Wily Walloo, wrestle a Grizzly-Ghastly, and ski down a slope dotted with giant cacti. But if his performance is up to McGurkian expectations, then "Why, ladies and gentlemen, youngsters and oldsters, your heads will quite likely spin right off your shouldsters!" Sneelock won't mind it one bit because he likes to help out.

At the end of Morris's fantasy, Sneelock is casting a serious eye at him.
