= The 500 Hats of Bartholomew Cubbins =

1938 children's book by Dr. Seuss

- Author: Dr. Seuss
- Illustrator: Dr. Seuss
- Cover artist: Dr. Seuss
- Language: English
- Genre: Children's literature
- Publisher: Vanguard Press
- Publication date: September 1, 1938 (renewed in 1965)
- Publication place: United States
- Media type: Print (hardcover)
- OCLC: 192190
- Preceded by: And to Think That I Saw It on Mulberry Street
- Followed by: The King's Stilts

The 500 Hats of Bartholomew Cubbins is a children's book, written and illustrated by Theodor Geisel under the pen name Dr. Seuss and published by Vanguard Press in 1938. Unlike the majority of Geisel's books, it is written in prose rather than rhyming and metered verse. Geisel, who was a collector of hats, got the idea for the story when he was on a commuter train from New York to New England, while sitting behind a businessman wearing a hat. The businessman was so stiff and formal that Geisel idly wondered what would happen if he took the man's hat and threw it out the window, and he artistically concluded that the man would "simply grow a new one".

The characters of Bartholomew and King Derwin returned a decade later in Bartholomew and the Oobleck.

== Plot summary ==
Set in feudal times, the story begins in the Kingdom of Didd. A young peasant boy named Bartholomew Cubbins lives on the outskirts of the kingdom with his family; he wears a simple red hat with a single white feather that has been in his family for generations. One day, Bartholomew goes into the town to sell some cranberries, when he comes across King Theobald Thindner Derwin, the ruler of the Kingdom of Didd, riding through a street. As per law, one is supposed to remove his/her hat when the king passes by, but although Bartholomew does remove his hat, despite having it in his hand, the king points out and orders him to remove an identical hat on his head. Bartholomew does so repeatedly, but a new hat appears on his head every time.

The boy is taken to the palace, where numerous people attempt to remove the hat from Bartholomew's head, but all attempts end in failure. The royal hatter runs away in terror; the King's wise men only nibble their beards in awe; the King's young nephew, Wilfred, fails to shoot the hats off with arrows; a great bowman similarly fails with a longbow; and the royal magicians attempt to curse the hat away, but claim that their spell will only work in "Ten Short Years". The King, exasperated by all the attempts, orders Bartholomew to be executed, but the sentence cannot be carried out because the law forbids the execution of anyone wearing a hat.

Wilfred subsequently suggests throwing Bartholomew from the highest tower as punishment. The King, though mildly upset by the idea, agrees. Bartholomew begins pushing his hats off rapidly as they climb the tower; as this continues, the hats begin to grow in extravagance and beauty from the 451st hat onwards - the 451st hat has two feathers, the 452nd hat has three, the 453rd hat has three feathers and a small gem, and so on. Ultimately, the 500th hat is revealed as the greatest, studded with a massive gem and feathers from rare birds, although Bartholomew seems unaware of the fact. The king is stunned by the beauty of the hat, but Wilfred is more incensed than before at the sight of it. He tries to push Bartholomew off the tower against the King's wishes, but the King saves Bartholomew's life by spanking Wilfred as a punishment. King Derwin then grants Bartholomew a reprieve, requesting all 500 hats, (the 500th being, to Bartholomew's joy, the final hat), in exchange for 500 gold coins. Bartholomew agrees, and is sent home with his massive reward, while the King keeps all the hats in a massive display case to admire for years to come and makes Bartholomew his personal advisor and page boy as a reward for completing the task. The story ends with the narrator explaining that nobody in the Kingdom of Didd ever figured out how the hats kept appearing on Bartholomew's head, and that "they could only say it just 'happened to happen' and was not very likely to happen again."

== Bartholomew Cubbins ==
Bartholomew Cubbins is a fictional page, a pleasant boy, and the hero of both The 500 Hats of Bartholomew Cubbins (1938) and Bartholomew and the Oobleck (1949). Cubbins also appears in "King Grimalken and the Wishbones", the first of Seuss's so-called "lost stories" that were only published in magazines. Besides the three printed stories about him—and the stage adaptations of both books—Bartholomew Cubbins also appears as a character in the TV show The Wubbulous World of Dr. Seuss. Seuss's only film, The 5,000 Fingers of Dr. T., has a main character named Bartholomew Collins who is based on Cubbins, and, like his namesake, is a young boy who is wiser than the adults around him.

Robert L. Short (1932–2009), in his book The Parables of Dr. Seuss, points out that Bartholomew shares a name with one of the apostles of Jesus. Bartholomew Cubbins presses the silly King Derwin of the Kingdom of Didd into humility and repentance, encouraging the king to apologize for his harmful actions.

== Reception ==
The book received positive reviews from critics. The New York Times reviewer called the book "a lovely bit of tomfoolery which keeps up the suspense and surprise until the end". Booklist, which had criticized Geisel's previous book, And to Think That I Saw It on Mulberry Street, for containing only enough material for one comic strip, praised The 500 Hats as "a brand-new idea, developed into a complete tale, not too long, not too short, just right. Somewhere between the Sunday supplements and the Brothers Grimm, Dr. Seuss has produced a picture book combining features of both". Alexander Laing, who had worked with Geisel on the Dartmouth Jack-O-Lantern humor magazine, wrote in his review of the book in the Dartmouth Alumni Magazine: "His several other occupations, madly fascinating as they are, may have been only preludes to a discovery of his proper vocation. That he is a rare and loopy genius has been common knowledge from an early epoch of his undergrad troubles. It now becomes plain that his is the self-consistent, happy madness beloved by children. I do not see what is to prevent him from becoming the Grimm of our times".

== Adaptations ==
- Not long after publication, the story was adapted for an album issued by RCA Victor (Y-339). Narrated by Paul Wing, the audio adaptation had a running time of 13 minutes and 37 seconds. The dramatization featured music and sound effects on two 10" 78 rpm records in a bi-fold sleeve.
- Geisel wrote the script for the 1943 Puppetoons short of the same name for Paramount Pictures, which was produced by George Pal. It also received a nomination for the Academy Award for Best Animated Short Film. Unlike the book's illustrations, in which Cubbins' hats were all the same one, the hats in the film were of many different kinds.
- Minnesota's Children's Theatre Company produced a version of The 500 Hats of Bartholomew Cubbins for the stage in its 1979–1980 season, and says this was the first theater adaptation of a Dr. Seuss work.
