= If I Ran the Zoo =

1950 children's book by Dr. Seuss

- Author: Dr. Seuss
- Original title: If I Got to the Zoo
- Illustrator: Dr. Seuss
- Language: English
- Genre: Children's literature
- Publisher: Redbook (magazine); Random House (book)
- Publication date: 1950 (renewed in 1977)
- Publication place: United States
- Media type: Print (hardcover)
- Pages: 40
- ISBN: 978-0-394-80081-3
- OCLC: 470411
- Preceded by: Bartholomew and the Oobleck
- Followed by: Scrambled Eggs Super!

If I Ran the Zoo is a discontinued children's book written by Dr. Seuss in 1950.

The book is written in anapestic tetrameter, Seuss's usual verse type, and illustrated in Seuss's pen-and-ink style. It is the first book of the If I Ran the... book franchise.

== Plot ==
When young Gerald McGrew visits the zoo, he finds an "old fellow" who runs the zoo. Gerald starts daydreaming about what he would do if he were in charge, and decides that the exotic animals on display are "not good enough". He says that if he ran the zoo, he would set all of the current animals free and find new, more bizarre and exotic ones. Throughout the book he lists these creatures, starting with a lion with ten feet and escalating to more imaginative (and imaginary) creatures, such as the Fizza-ma-Wizza-ma-Dill, "the world's biggest bird from the island of Gwark, who eats only pine trees, and spits out the bark".

The illustrations also grow wilder as McGrew imagines going to increasingly remote and exotic habitats, capturing each fanciful creature, and bringing them all back to a zoo now filled with his new wild animals. He also imagines the praise he receives from others, who are amazed at his "new Zoo, McGrew Zoo".

== Adaptation ==
Some of the animals featured in If I Ran the Zoo have been featured in a segment of The Hoober-Bloob Highway, a 1975 CBS TV special. In this segment, Hoober-Bloob babies don't have to be human if they don't choose to be, so Mr. Hoober-Bloob shows them a variety of different animals, including ones from If I Ran the Zoo (and On Beyond Zebra!). Such animals include: Obsks, a flock of Wild Bippo-No-Bungus, a Tizzle-Topped Tufted Mazurka, a Big-Bug-Who-Is-Very-Surprising, Chuggs, a Deer with Horns-That-Are-Just-A-Bit-Queer, a New Sort-Of-A-Hen, an Elephant-Cat, and an Iota.

In the 2008 American animated film Horton Hears a Who!, Palooskis(parrot-like birds with characteristic wig-like headdresses) (including Mrs. Quilligan (voiced by Jaime Pressly) and her daughter Jessica Quilligan (voiced by Laura Ortiz)), Glummoxes (the unnamed antylope-like animals in pre/post page, including Mrs. Glummox (voiced by Laraine Newman) and her daughter Angela Glummox (voiced by Colleen O'Shaughnessey)), and Deer-whose-horns-are-connected-from-one-to-the-others appear as residents of the Jungle of Nool.

== "Nerd" ==
If I Ran the Zoo is often credited with the first printed modern English appearance of the word "nerd", although the word is not used in its modern context. It is simply the name of an otherwise un-characterized imaginary creature, appearing in the sentence "And then, just to show them, I'll sail to Ka-Troo/And Bring Back an It-Kutch, a Preep, and a Proo,/A Nerkle, a Nerd, and a Seersucker too!"

== Theme park attraction ==
If I Ran the Zoo
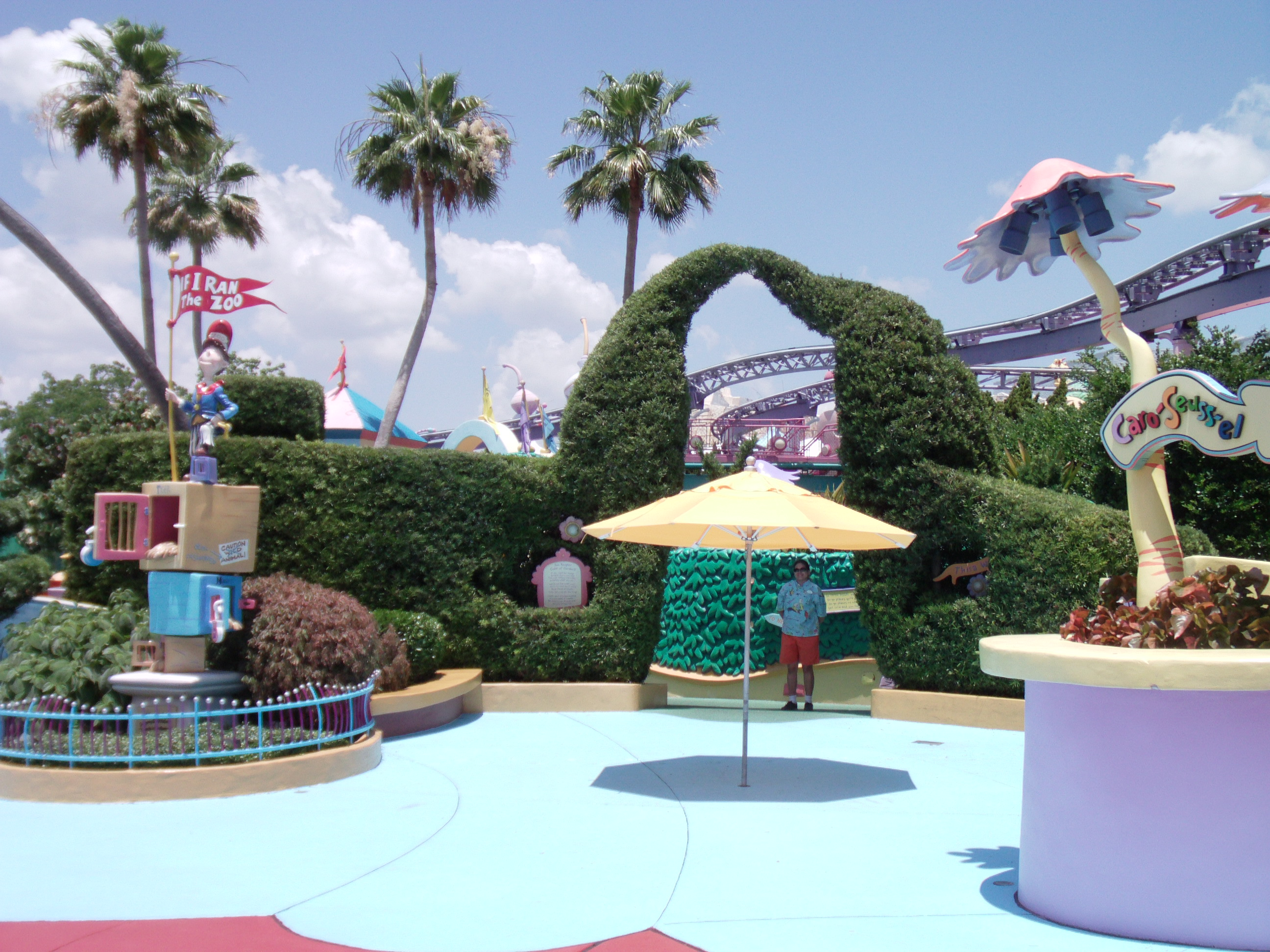
- Entrance

Universal Islands of Adventure
- Area: Seuss Landing
- Soft opening date: March 1999
- Opening date: May 28, 1999

Ride statistics
- Attraction type: Play Area
- Theme: If I Ran the Zoo

Dr. Seuss's Zoo book is also the main theme for one of the children's play areas at Universal Islands of Adventure. The small play area is located inside the area of the park known as Seuss Landing.

== Withdrawal from publication ==
If I Ran the Zoo has been criticized for its use of racial stereotypes and caricatures. In a 1988 biography of Dr. Seuss, Ruth K. MacDonald notes the perceived presence of "occasional stereotypes of native peoples—potbellied, thick-lipped blacks from Africa, squinty-eyed Orientals", that may offend some modern readers. A 2019 study published in the journal Research on Diversity in Youth Literature noted the perceived presence of dehumanizing stereotypes of East Asian, Sub-Saharan African and Middle Eastern characters. The Canadian Book and Periodical Council's Freedom to Read project listed the book as having been challenged in 2015 for insensitivity and ethnic stereotyping.

On March 2, 2021, Dr. Seuss Enterprises withdrew If I Ran the Zoo and five other books from publication due to controversy surrounding racist images within those books. Dr. Seuss Enterprises did not specify which illustrations were offensive.

== See also ==
- If I Ran the Circus
