= Mulberry Creek (Current River tributary) =

Stream in the U.S. state of Missouri

Mulberry Creek is a stream in southern Ripley County in the U.S. state of Missouri.

The stream headwaters arise in southwestern Ripley County at 36°35′05″N 90°55′41″W and the stream flows generally east passing under Missouri Route 21 to its confluence with the Current River about three miles southwest of Doniphan at 36°34′50″N 90°51′27″W and an elevation of 312 feet (95 m).

Mulberry Creek was so named due to the abundance of mulberry trees in the area.

== See also ==
- List of rivers of Missouri
