= Mulberry Fork (Loop Creek) =

Stream in West Virginia, U.S.

Coordinates: 38°06′04″N 81°13′47″W

Mulberry Fork is a stream in the U.S. state of West Virginia. It is a tributary of Loop Creek.

Mulberry Fork was so named on account of a mulberry tree which stood as a local landmark.

== See also ==
- List of rivers of West Virginia
