= Mulberry Township =

Mulberry Township may refer to:

- Mulberry Township, Crawford County, Arkansas, in Crawford County, Arkansas
- Mulberry Township, Franklin County, Arkansas, in Franklin County, Arkansas
- Mulberry Township, Johnson County, Arkansas, in Johnson County, Arkansas
- Mulberry Township, Clay County, Kansas
- Mulberry Township, Ellsworth County, Kansas
- Mulberry Township, Caldwell County, North Carolina, in Caldwell County, North Carolina
- Mulberry Township, Wilkes County, North Carolina, in Wilkes County, North Carolina
