= Mulberry Street (Springfield, Massachusetts) =

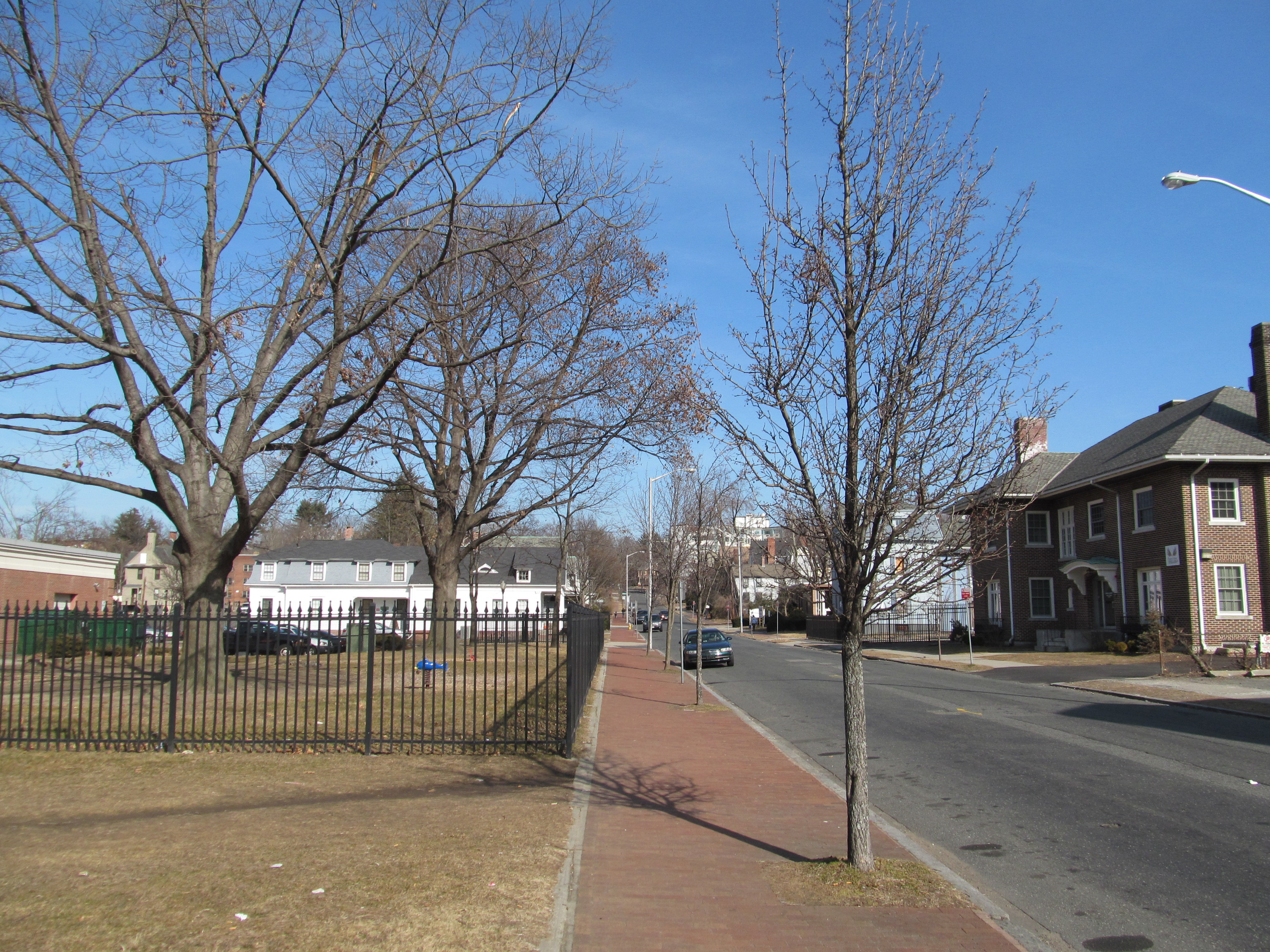
Mulberry Street

Mulberry Street (42.102224°N 72.578119°W) is a historic street and tourist destination in Springfield, Massachusetts. Made famous by Dr. Seuss' first children's book And to Think That I Saw It on Mulberry Street, the street is less than one mile from Springfield's Metro Center neighborhood, the Springfield Armory, and the Quadrangle. It is also less than one mile southwest of Dr. Seuss' boyhood home on Fairfield Street.

Mulberry Street is located in the Ridgewood Historic District of Springfield, in the city's Maple Hill neighborhood. From the 1820s until urban "white flight" in the 1960s, Maple Hill and Mulberry Street, in particular, were considered Springfield's "Gold Coast." Many ornate mansions still stand on the street, and in the general area along Maple Street. In the 1960s, Mulberry House, a luxury condominium building, was built on the hill nearing the street's highest elevation, with the rear of the building abutting historic Springfield Cemetery. From atop this hill one is afforded excellent views of Springfield and the Connecticut River.
