= Dr. Seuss =

American author and cartoonist (1904–1991)

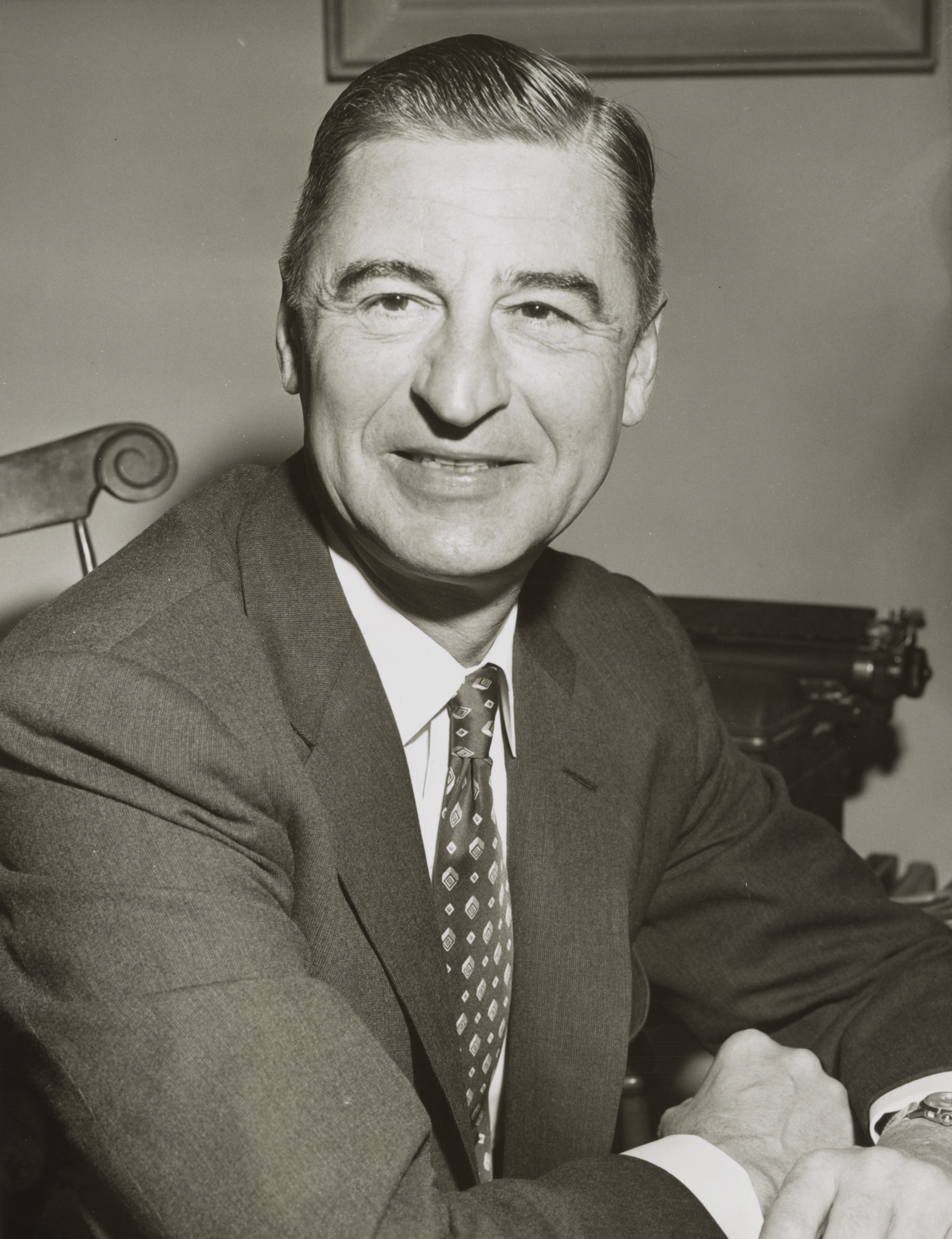
- Dr. Seuss in 1957
- Born: Theodor Seuss Geisel; March 2, 1904; Springfield, Massachusetts, U.S.
- Died: September 24, 1991 (aged 87); San Diego, California, U.S.
- Education: Dartmouth College (AB); Lincoln College, Oxford
- Occupations: Children's author; political cartoonist; illustrator; animator
- Spouses: Helen Palmer (m. 1927; died 1967) Audrey Stone Dimond (m. 1968)
- Writing career
- Pen name: Theo LeSieg; Rosetta Stone
- Years active: 1921–1991
- Genre: Children's literature
- Website: seussville.com

Theodor Seuss Geisel (/suːs ˈɡaɪzəl, zɔɪs -/ sooss GHY-zəl, zoyss -; March 2, 1904 – September 24, 1991) was an American children's author, illustrator, animator, and cartoonist. He is known for his work writing and illustrating more than 60 books under the pen name Dr. Seuss (/suːs, zuːs/ sooss, zooss). His work includes many of the most popular children's books of all time, selling over 600 million copies and being translated into more than 20 languages by the time of his death.

Geisel adopted the name "Dr. Seuss" as an undergraduate at Dartmouth College and as a graduate student at Lincoln College, Oxford. He left Oxford in 1927 to begin his career as an illustrator and cartoonist for Vanity Fair, Life, and various other publications. He also worked as an illustrator for advertising campaigns, including for Flit and Standard Oil, and as a political cartoonist for the New York newspaper PM. He published his first children's book And to Think That I Saw It on Mulberry Street in 1937. During World War II, he took a brief hiatus from children's literature to illustrate political cartoons, and he worked in the animation and film department of the United States Army.

After the war, Geisel returned to writing children's books, writing acclaimed works such as If I Ran the Zoo (1950), Horton Hears a Who! (1954), The Cat in the Hat (1957), How the Grinch Stole Christmas! (1957), Green Eggs and Ham (1960), One Fish, Two Fish, Red Fish, Blue Fish (1960), The Sneetches and Other Stories (1961), The Lorax (1971), The Butter Battle Book (1984), and Oh, the Places You'll Go! (1990). He published over 60 books during his career, which have spawned numerous adaptations, including eleven television specials, five feature films, a Broadway musical, and four television series.

He received two Primetime Emmy Awards for Outstanding Children's Special for Halloween Is Grinch Night (1978) and Outstanding Animated Program for The Grinch Grinches the Cat in the Hat (1982). In 1984, he won a Pulitzer Prize Special Citation. His birthday, March 2, has been adopted as the annual date for National Read Across America Day, an initiative focused on reading created by the National Education Association.

== Life and career ==
=== Early years ===
Geisel was born and raised in Springfield, Massachusetts, the son of Theodor Robert Geisel and Henrietta Geisel (née Seuss). His father managed the family brewery and was later appointed to supervise Springfield's public park system by Mayor John A. Denison after the brewery closed because of Prohibition. Mulberry Street in Springfield, made famous in his first children's book And to Think That I Saw It on Mulberry Street, is near his boyhood home on Fairfield Street. The family was of German descent, and Geisel and his sister Marnie experienced anti-German prejudice from other children following the outbreak of World War I in 1914. Geisel was raised as a Missouri Synod Lutheran and remained in the denomination his entire life.

Geisel was educated at Dartmouth College, graduating in 1925. At Dartmouth, he joined the Sigma Phi Epsilon fraternity and the humor magazine Dartmouth Jack-O-Lantern, eventually rising to the rank of editor-in-chief. While at Dartmouth, he was caught drinking gin with nine friends in his room. At the time, the possession and consumption of alcohol was illegal under Prohibition laws, which remained in place between 1920 and 1933. As a result of this infraction, Dean Craven Laycock insisted that Geisel resign from all extracurricular activities, including the Jack-O-Lantern. To continue working on the magazine without the administration's knowledge, Geisel began signing his work with the pen name "Seuss". He was encouraged in his writing by professor of rhetoric W. Benfield Pressey, whom he described as his "big inspiration for writing" at Dartmouth.

Upon graduating from Dartmouth, he entered Lincoln College, Oxford, intending to earn a Doctor of Philosophy (D.Phil.) in English literature. At Oxford, he met his future wife Helen Palmer, who encouraged him to give up becoming an English teacher in favor of pursuing drawing as a career. She later recalled that "Ted's notebooks were always filled with these fabulous animals. So I set to work diverting him; here was a man who could draw such pictures; he should be earning a living doing that."

=== Early career ===
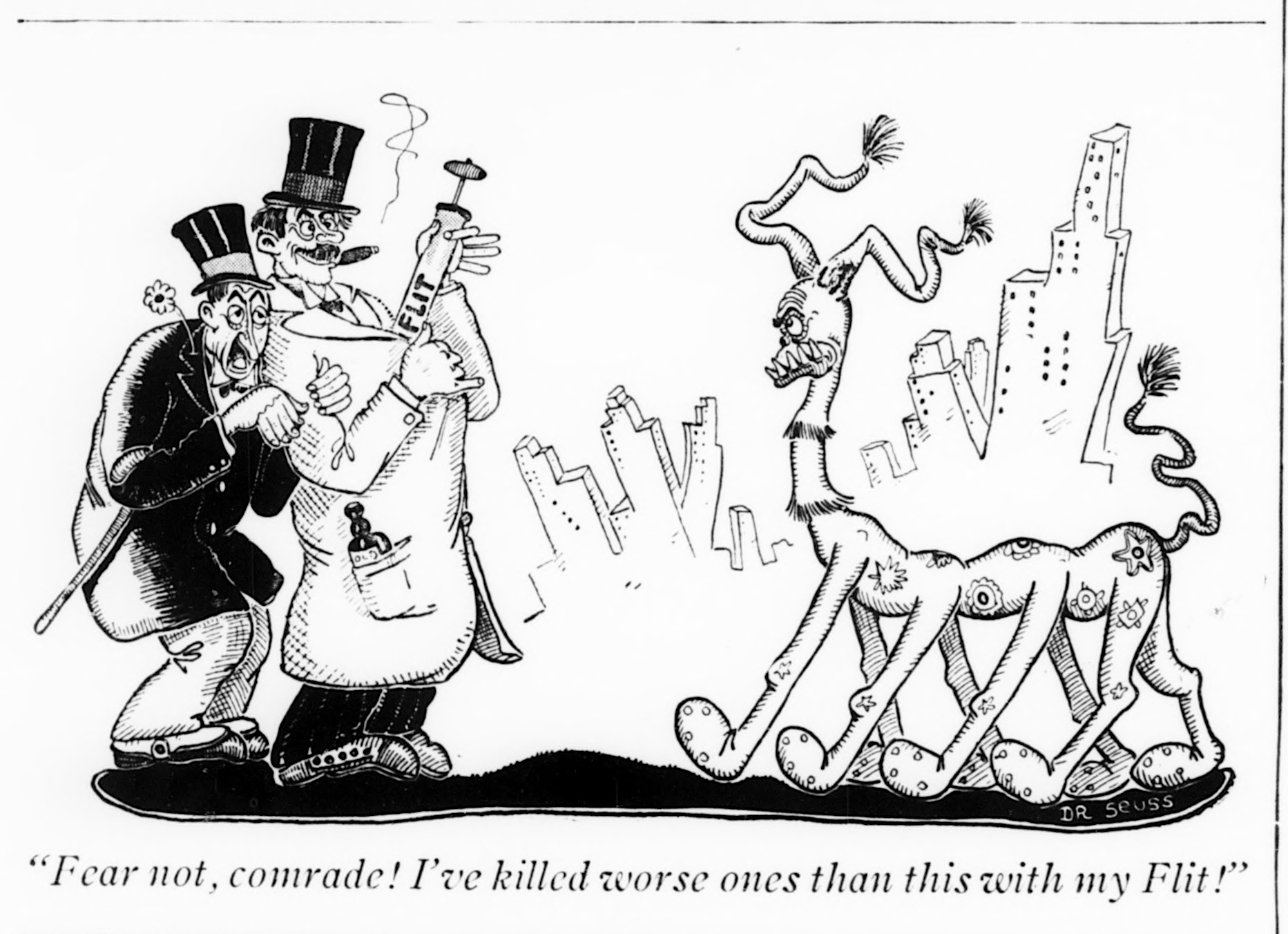
An ad for Flit drawn by Dr. Seuss, appearing in the New Yorker issue of July 14, 1928

Geisel left Oxford without earning a degree and returned to the United States in February 1927, where he immediately began submitting writings and drawings to magazines, book publishers, and advertising agencies. Making use of his time in Europe, he pitched a series of cartoons called Eminent Europeans to Life magazine, but the magazine passed on it. His first nationally published cartoon appeared in the July 16, 1927, issue of The Saturday Evening Post. This single $25 sale encouraged Geisel to move from Springfield to New York City. Later that year, Geisel accepted a job as writer and illustrator at the humor magazine Judge, and he felt financially stable enough to marry Palmer. His first cartoon for Judge appeared on October 22, 1927, and Geisel and Palmer were married on November 29. Geisel's first work signed "Dr. Seuss" was published in Judge about six months after he started working there.

In early 1928, one of Geisel's cartoons for Judge mentioned Flit, a common bug spray at the time manufactured by Standard Oil of New Jersey. According to Geisel, the wife of an advertising executive in charge of advertising Flit saw Geisel's cartoon at a hairdresser's and urged her husband to sign him. Geisel's first Flit ad appeared on May 31, 1928, and the campaign continued sporadically until 1941. The campaign's catchphrase "Quick, Henry, the Flit!" became a part of popular culture. It spawned a song and was used as a punch line for comedians such as Fred Allen and Jack Benny. As Geisel gained fame for the Flit campaign, his work was in demand and began to appear regularly in magazines such as Life, Liberty and Vanity Fair.

==== Essomarine ====
Geisel gained a significant public profile through a program for motor boat lubricants produced by Standard Oil under the brand name Essomarine. He later recounted that Harry Bruno, Ted Cook, and Verne Carrier worked with him for exhibits at the National Motor Boat Show called the Seuss Navy. In 1934 Geisel produced a 30 page booklet Secrets of the Deep which was available by mail after June. At the January boat show for 1935, visitors filled out order cards to receive Secrets. Geisel drew up a Certificate of Commission for visitors in 1936. A mock ship deck called SS Essomarine provided the scene where photos of "Admirals" were taken. That summer Geisel released a second volume of Secrets. For the 1937 show he sculpted Marine Muggs and designed a flag for the Seuss Navy. The following year featured "Little Dramas of the Deep", a six-act play with ten characters. According to Geisel’s sister, "He plans the whole show with scenery and action and then, standing in a realistic bridge, reels off a speech which combines advertising with humor." For 1939 exhibitors made available the Nuzzlepuss ashtray and illustrated tide-table calendars. On 11 January 1940, at the Waldorf-Astoria Hotel, a Seuss Navy Luncheon was held. At that year’s boat show Geisel provided the Navigamarama exhibit and the Sea Lawyers Gazette. The final contribution to the Essomarine project, in 1941, was the mermaid Essie Neptune and her pet whale. The exhibit offered photos for a Happy Cruising passport.

Geisel's success with the Flit campaign led to more advertising work, including for other Standard Oil products like Essomarine boat fuel and Essolube Motor Oil and for other companies like the Ford Motor Company, NBC Radio Network, and Holly Sugar. His first foray into books, Boners, a collection of children's sayings that he illustrated, was published by Viking Press in 1931. It topped The New York Times non-fiction bestseller list and led to a sequel, More Boners, published the same year. Encouraged by the books' sales and positive critical reception, Geisel wrote and illustrated an ABC book featuring "very strange animals" that failed to interest publishers.

The money Geisel earned from his advertising work and magazine submissions made him wealthier than even his most successful Dartmouth classmates. The increased income allowed the Geisels to move to better quarters and to socialize in higher social circles. They became friends with the wealthy family of banker Frank A. Vanderlip. They also traveled extensively: by 1936, Geisel and his wife had visited 30 countries together. They did not have children, neither kept regular office hours, and they had ample money. Geisel also felt that traveling helped his creativity.

In 1936, Geisel and his wife were returning from an ocean voyage to Europe when the rhythm of the ship's engines inspired the poem that became his first children's book: And to Think That I Saw It on Mulberry Street. Based on Geisel's varied accounts, the book was rejected by between 20 and 43 publishers. According to Geisel, he was walking home to burn the manuscript when a chance encounter with an old Dartmouth classmate led to its publication by Vanguard Press. Geisel wrote four more books before the US entered World War II. This included The 500 Hats of Bartholomew Cubbins in 1938, as well as The King's Stilts and The Seven Lady Godivas in 1939, all of which were in prose, atypically for him. This was followed by Horton Hatches the Egg in 1940, in which Geisel returned to the use of verse.

=== World War II–era work ===
"The Goldbrick", Private Snafu episode written by Seuss, 1943

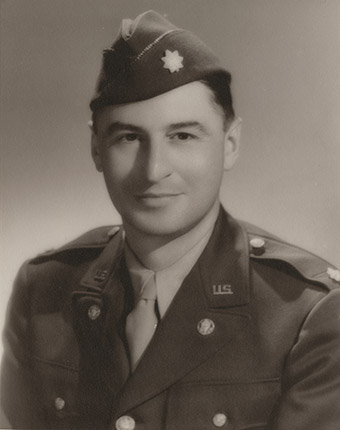
Official U.S. Army portrait of Dr. Seuss

As World War II began, Geisel turned to political cartoons, drawing over 400 in two years as editorial cartoonist for the left-leaning New York City daily newspaper, PM. Geisel's political cartoons, later published in Dr. Seuss Goes to War, denounced Adolf Hitler and Benito Mussolini and were highly critical of non-interventionists ("isolationists"), such as Charles Lindbergh, who opposed US entry into the war. One cartoon depicted Japanese Americans being handed TNT in anticipation of a "signal from home", while other cartoons deplored the anti-black racism and antisemitism that harmed the war effort. His cartoons were strongly supportive of President Roosevelt's handling of the war, combining the usual exhortations to ration and contribute to the war effort with frequent attacks on Congress (especially the Republican Party), parts of the press (such as the New York Daily News, Chicago Tribune and Washington Times-Herald), and others for criticism of Roosevelt, criticism of aid to the Soviet Union, investigation of suspected Communists, and other offences that he depicted as leading to disunity and helping the Nazis, intentionally or inadvertently.

In 1942, Geisel turned his energies to direct support of the U.S. war effort. First, he worked drawing posters for the Treasury Department and the War Production Board. Then, in 1943, he joined the Army as a captain and was commander of the Animation Department of the First Motion Picture Unit of the United States Army Air Forces, where he wrote films that included Your Job in Germany, a 1945 propaganda film about peace in Europe after World War II; Our Job in Japan and the Private Snafu series of adult army training films. While in the Army, he was awarded the Legion of Merit. Our Job in Japan became the basis for the commercially released film Design for Death (1947), a study of Japanese culture that won the Academy Award for Best Documentary Feature Film. Gerald McBoing-Boing (1950) was based on an original story by Seuss and won the Academy Award for Best Animated Short Film.

=== Later years ===
After the war, Geisel and his wife moved to the La Jolla community of San Diego, California, where he returned to writing children's books. He published most of his books through Random House in North America and William Collins, Sons (later HarperCollins) internationally. He wrote many, including such favorites as If I Ran the Zoo (1950), Horton Hears a Who! (1955), If I Ran the Circus (1956), The Cat in the Hat (1957), How the Grinch Stole Christmas! (1957), and Green Eggs and Ham (1960). He received numerous awards throughout his career, but he won neither the Caldecott Medal nor the Newbery Medal. Three of his titles from this period were, however, chosen as Caldecott runners-up (now referred to as Caldecott Honor books): McElligot's Pool (1947), Bartholomew and the Oobleck (1949), and If I Ran the Zoo (1950). Dr. Seuss also wrote the musical and fantasy film The 5,000 Fingers of Dr. T., which was released in 1953. The movie was a critical and financial failure, and Geisel never attempted another feature film. During the 1950s, he published numerous illustrated short stories, predominantly in Redbook magazine. Several of these were subsequently anthologized (e.g., The Sneetches and Other Stories) or adapted into books (e.g., If I Ran the Zoo), though a number have never been reprinted since their original appearances.

In May 1954, Life published a report on illiteracy among school children which concluded that children were not learning to read because their books were boring. William Ellsworth Spaulding was the director of the education division at Houghton Mifflin (he later became its chairman), and he compiled a list of 348 words that he felt were important for first-graders to recognize. He asked Geisel to cut the list to 250 words and to write a book using only those words. Spaulding challenged Geisel to "bring back a book children can't put down". Nine months later, Geisel completed The Cat in the Hat, using 236 of the words given to him. It retained the drawing style, verse rhythms, and all the imaginative power of Geisel's earlier works but, because of its simplified vocabulary, it could be read by beginning readers. The Cat in the Hat and subsequent books written for young children achieved significant international success and they remain very popular today. For example, in 2009, Green Eggs and Ham sold 540,000 copies, The Cat in the Hat sold 452,000 copies, and One Fish, Two Fish, Red Fish, Blue Fish (1960) sold 409,000 copies—all outselling the majority of newly published children's books.

Geisel went on to write many other children's books, both in his new simplified-vocabulary manner (sold as Beginner Books) and in his older, more elaborate style.

In 1955, Dartmouth awarded Geisel an honorary doctorate of Humane Letters, with the citation:

Creator and fancier of fanciful beasts, your affinity for flying elephants and man-eating mosquitoes makes us rejoice you were not around to be Director of Admissions on Mr. Noah's ark. But our rejoicing in your career is far more positive: as author and artist you singlehandedly have stood as St. George between a generation of exhausted parents and the demon dragon of unexhausted children on a rainy day. There was an inimitable wriggle in your work long before you became a producer of motion pictures and animated cartoons and, as always with the best of humor, behind the fun there has been intelligence, kindness, and a feel for humankind. An Academy Award winner and holder of the Legion of Merit for war film work, you have stood these many years in the academic shadow of your learned friend Dr. Seuss; and because we are sure the time has come when the good doctor would want you to walk by his side as a full equal and because your College delights to acknowledge the distinction of a loyal son, Dartmouth confers on you her Doctorate of Humane Letters.

Geisel joked that he would now have to sign "Dr. Dr. Seuss". His wife was ill at the time, so he delayed accepting it until June 1956.

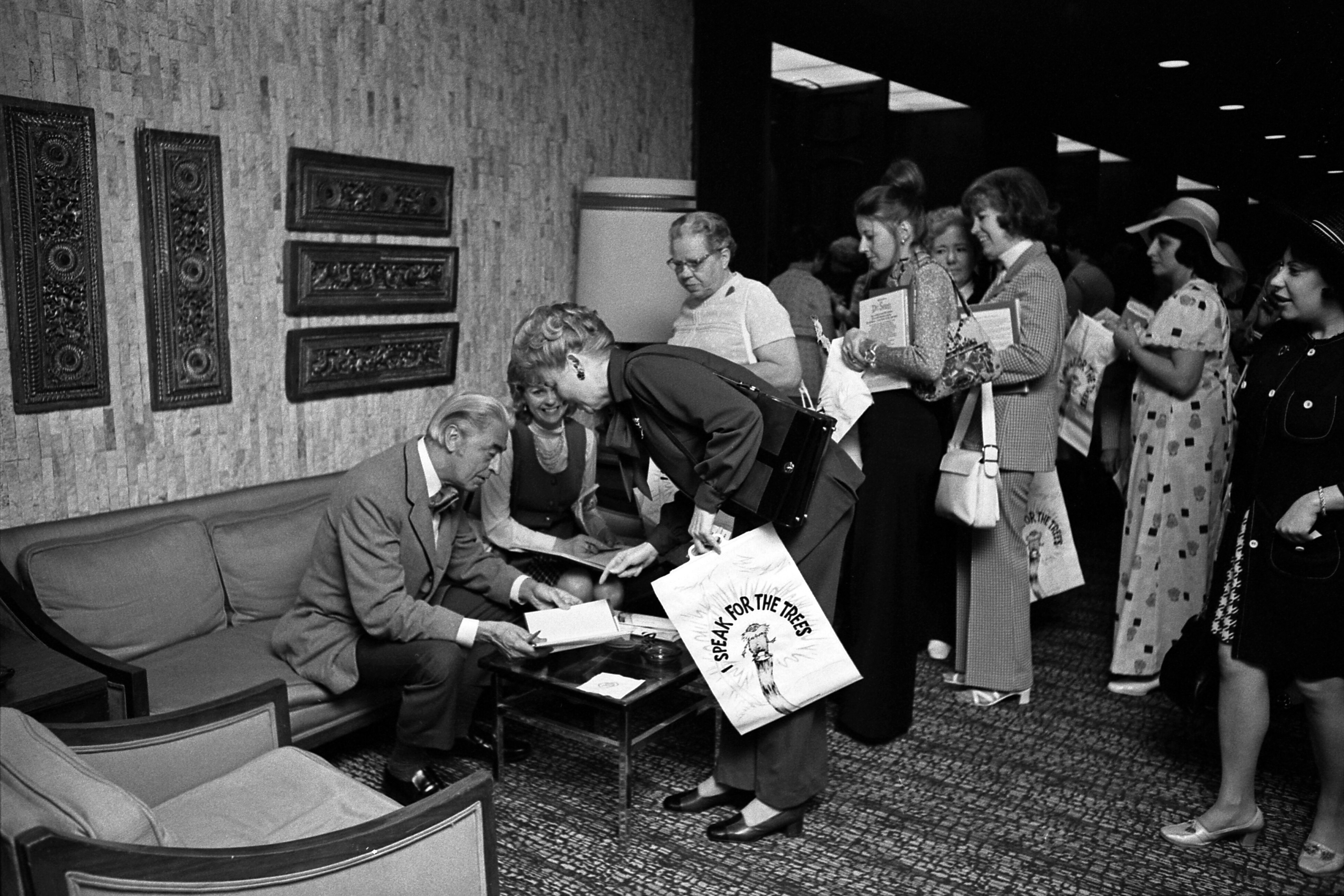
Dr. Seuss signing books, 1974

Geisel's wife Helen had a long struggle with illnesses. On October 23, 1967, Helen died by suicide. On August 5, 1968, Geisel married Audrey Dimond, a married mother of two children with whom he had been having an affair. Although he devoted most of his life to writing children's books, Geisel had no children of his own, saying of children: "You have 'em; I'll entertain 'em." Audrey added that Geisel "lived his whole life without children and he was very happy without children." Audrey oversaw Geisel's estate until her death on December 19, 2018, at the age of 97.

Geisel was awarded an honorary doctorate of Humane Letters (L.H.D.) from Whittier College in 1980. He also received the Laura Ingalls Wilder Medal from the professional children's librarians in 1980, recognizing his "substantial and lasting contributions to children's literature". At the time, it was awarded every five years. He won a special Pulitzer Prize in 1984 citing his "contribution over nearly half a century to the education and enjoyment of America's children and their parents". In 1985, Geisel received an Honorary Doctor of Fine Arts degree from Princeton University for showing children "the way to the adult world, as he shows adults the way to the child".

== Illness, death, and posthumous honors ==
Geisel died of cancer on September 24, 1991, at his home in the La Jolla community of San Diego at the age of 87. His ashes were scattered in the Pacific Ocean. On December 1, 1995, four years after his death, University of California, San Diego's University Library Building was renamed Geisel Library in honor of Geisel and Audrey for the generous contributions that they made to the library and their devotion to improving literacy.

In 2002, the Dr. Seuss National Memorial Sculpture Garden opened in Springfield, Massachusetts, featuring sculptures of Geisel and of many of his characters. In 2017, the Amazing World of Dr. Seuss Museum opened next to the Dr. Seuss National Memorial Sculpture Garden in the Springfield Museums Quadrangle. In 2008, Dr. Seuss was inducted into the California Hall of Fame. In 2004, U.S. children's librarians established the annual Theodor Seuss Geisel Award to recognize "the most distinguished American book for beginning readers published in English in the United States during the preceding year". It should "demonstrate creativity and imagination to engage children in reading" from pre-kindergarten to second grade. At Dartmouth College, incoming first-year students participate in pre-matriculation trips run by the Dartmouth Outing Club, eating green eggs and ham for breakfast at the Moosilauke Ravine Lodge. On April 4, 2012, the Dartmouth Medical School was renamed the Audrey and Theodor Geisel School of Medicine in honor of their many years of generosity to the college. Dr. Seuss has a star on the Hollywood Walk of Fame at the 6500 block of Hollywood Boulevard.

In 2012, a crater on the planet Mercury was named after Geisel.

=== Posthumous publishing ===
In the years after his death in 1991, two additional books were published based on his sketches and notes: Hooray for Diffendoofer Day! and Daisy-Head Mayzie. My Many Colored Days was originally written in 1973 but was posthumously published in 1996. In September 2011, seven stories originally published in magazines during the 1950s were released in a collection titled The Bippolo Seed and Other Lost Stories.

== Pen names ==
Geisel's most famous pen name is regularly pronounced /suːs/, an anglicized pronunciation of his German name (the standard German pronunciation is [ˈzɔʏ̯s]). He himself noted that it rhymed with "voice" (his own pronunciation being /sɔɪs/). Alexander Laing, one of his collaborators on the Dartmouth Jack-O-Lantern, wrote of it:

You're wrong as the deuce
And you shouldn't rejoice
If you're calling him Seuss.
He pronounces it Soice (or Zoice)

Geisel switched to the anglicized pronunciation because it "evoked a figure advantageous for an author of children's books to be associated with—Mother Goose" and because most people used this pronunciation. He added the "Doctor (abbreviated Dr.)" to his pen name because his father had always wanted him to practice medicine.

For books that Geisel wrote and others illustrated, he used the pen name "Theo LeSieg", starting with Ten Apples Up On Top published in 1961. "LeSieg" is "Geisel" spelled backward. Geisel also published one book under the name Rosetta Stone, 1975's Because a Little Bug Went Ka-Choo!!, a collaboration with Michael K. Frith. Frith and Geisel chose the name in honor of Geisel's second wife Audrey, whose maiden name was Stone.

== Political views ==
Geisel was a liberal Democrat and a supporter of President Franklin D. Roosevelt and the New Deal. His early political cartoons show a passionate opposition to fascism, and he urged action against it both before and after the U.S. entered World War II. His cartoons portrayed the fear of communism as overstated, finding greater threats in the House Committee on Unamerican Activities and those who threatened to cut the U.S.'s "life line" to the USSR and Stalin, whom he once depicted as a porter carrying "our war load".

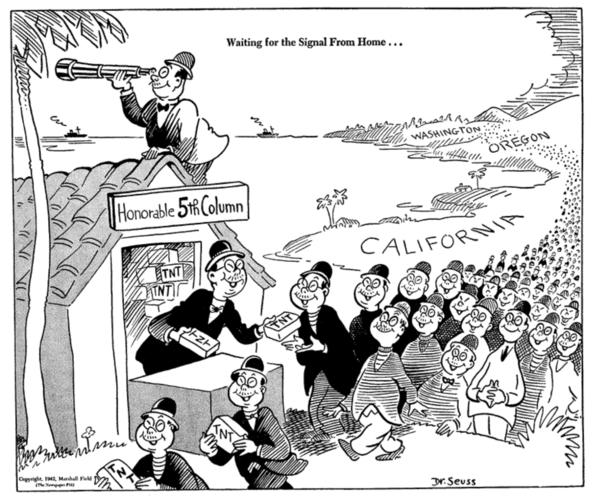
Dr. Seuss 1942 cartoon with the caption 'Waiting for the Signal from Home'

Geisel supported the internment of Japanese Americans during World War II in order to prevent possible sabotage. Geisel explained his position:

But right now, when the Japs are planting their hatchets in our skulls, it seems like a hell of a time for us to smile and warble: "Brothers!" It is a rather flabby battle cry. If we want to win, we've got to kill Japs, whether it depresses John Haynes Holmes or not. We can get palsy-walsy afterward with those that are left.

After the war, Geisel overcame his feelings of animosity and re-examined his view, using his book Horton Hears a Who! (1954) as an allegory for the American post-war occupation of Japan, as well as dedicating the book to a Japanese friend.

Geisel converted a copy of one of his famous children's books, Marvin K. Mooney Will You Please Go Now!, into a polemic shortly before the end of the 1972–1974 Watergate scandal, in which U.S. president Richard Nixon resigned, by replacing the name of the main character everywhere that it occurred. "Richard M. Nixon, Will You Please Go Now!" was published in major newspapers through the column of his friend Art Buchwald.

The line "a person's a person, no matter how small" from Horton Hears a Who! has been used widely as a slogan by the pro-life movement in the United States. Geisel and later his widow Audrey objected to this use; according to her attorney, "She doesn't like people to hijack Dr. Seuss characters or material to front their own points of view." In the 1980s, Geisel threatened to sue an anti-abortion group for using this phrase on their stationery, according to his biographer, causing them to remove it. The attorney says he never discussed abortion with either of them, and the biographer says Geisel never expressed a public opinion on the subject. After Seuss's death, Audrey gave financial support to Planned Parenthood.

=== In his children's books ===
Geisel made a point of not beginning to write his stories with a moral in mind, stating that "kids can see a moral coming a mile off". He was not against writing about issues, however; he said that "there's an inherent moral in any story", and he remarked that he was "subversive as hell".

Geisel's books express his views on a wide variety of social and political issues: The Lorax (1971), about environmentalism and anti-consumerism; The Sneetches (1961), about racial equality; The Butter Battle Book (1984), about the arms race; Yertle the Turtle (1958), about Adolf Hitler and anti-authoritarianism; How the Grinch Stole Christmas! (1957), criticizing the economic materialism and consumerism of the Christmas season; and Horton Hears a Who! (1954), about anti-isolationism and internationalism.

=== Retired books ===
Seuss's work for children has been criticized for unconscious racist themes. Dr. Seuss Enterprises, the organization that owns the rights to the books, films, TV shows, stage productions, exhibitions, digital media, licensed merchandise, and other strategic partnerships, announced on March 2, 2021, that it would stop publishing and licensing six books. The publications include And to Think That I Saw It on Mulberry Street (1937), If I Ran the Zoo (1950), McElligot's Pool (1947), On Beyond Zebra! (1955), Scrambled Eggs Super! (1953) and The Cat's Quizzer (1976). According to the organization, the books "portray people in ways that are hurtful and wrong" and are no longer being published.

== Style ==
=== Poetic meters ===
Geisel wrote most of his books in anapestic tetrameter, a three-beat poetic meter employed by many poets of the English literary canon. This is often suggested as one of the reasons that Geisel's writing was so well received. Some of his books, especially those for the youngest children such as Green Eggs and Ham and One Fish, Two Fish, Red Fish, Blue Fish use two-beat iambic or trochaic tetrameter.

=== Artwork ===
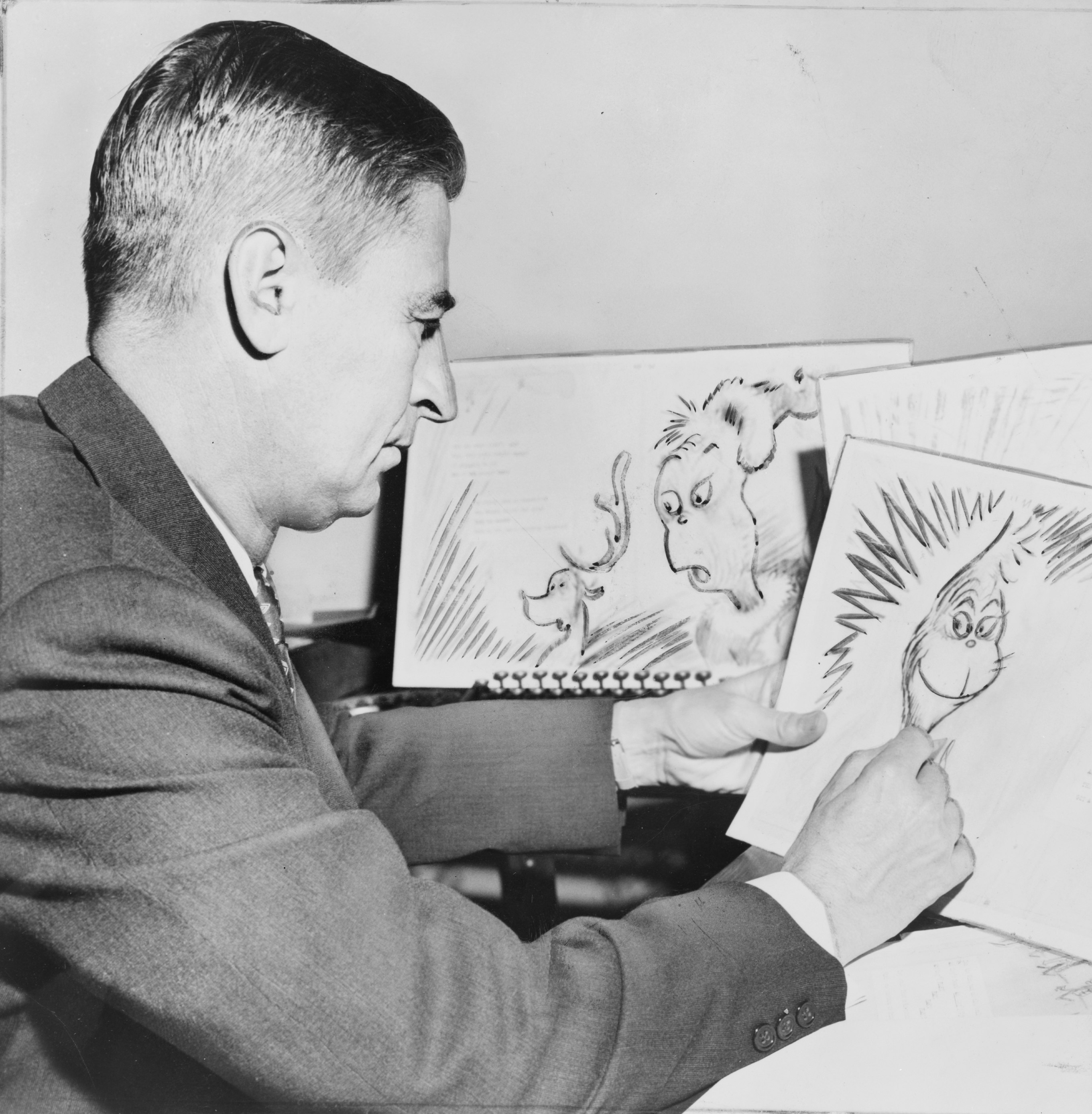
Geisel at work on a drawing of the Grinch for How the Grinch Stole Christmas! in 1957

Geisel's early artwork often employed the shaded texture of pencil drawings or watercolors, but in his children's books of the postwar period, he generally made use of a starker medium—pen and ink—normally using just black, white, and one or two colors. His later books, such as The Lorax, used more colors.

Geisel's style was unique—his figures are often "rounded" and somewhat droopy. This is true, for instance, of the faces of the Grinch and the Cat in the Hat. Almost all his buildings and machinery were devoid of straight lines when they were drawn, even when he was representing real objects. For example, If I Ran the Circus shows a droopy hoisting crane and a droopy steam calliope.

Geisel evidently enjoyed drawing architecturally elaborate objects, and some of his motifs are identifiable with structures in his childhood home of Springfield, including examples such as the onion domes of its Main Street and his family's brewery. His endlessly varied but never rectilinear palaces, ramps, platforms, and free-standing stairways are among his most evocative creations. Geisel also drew complex imaginary machines, such as the Audio-Telly-O-Tally-O-Count, from Dr. Seuss's Sleep Book, or the "most peculiar machine" of Sylvester McMonkey McBean in The Sneetches. Geisel also liked drawing outlandish arrangements of feathers or fur: for example, the 500th hat of Bartholomew Cubbins, the tail of Gertrude McFuzz, and the pet for girls who like to brush and comb, in One Fish, Two Fish, Red Fish, Blue Fish.

Geisel's illustrations often convey motion vividly. He was fond of a sort of "voilà" gesture in which the hand flips outward and the fingers spread slightly backward with the thumb up. This motion is done by Ish in One Fish, Two Fish, Red Fish, Blue Fish when he creates fish (who perform the gesture with their fins), in the introduction of the various acts of If I Ran the Circus, and in the introduction of the "Little Cats" in The Cat in the Hat Comes Back. He was also fond of drawing hands with interlocked fingers, making it look as though his characters were twiddling their thumbs.

Geisel also follows the cartoon tradition of showing motion with lines, like in the sweeping lines that accompany Sneelock's final dive in If I Ran the Circus. Cartoon lines are also used to illustrate the action of the senses—sight, smell, and hearing—in The Big Brag, and lines even illustrate "thought", as in the moment when the Grinch conceives his awful plan to ruin Christmas.

== Best-selling lists ==
Geisel's books have topped many bestseller lists, sold over 600 million copies, and been translated into more than 20 languages. In 2000, Publishers Weekly compiled a list of the best-selling children's books of all time; of the top 100 hardcover books, 16 were written by Geisel, including Green Eggs and Ham, at number 4, The Cat in the Hat, at number 9, and One Fish, Two Fish, Red Fish, Blue Fish, at number 13.

== Adaptations ==
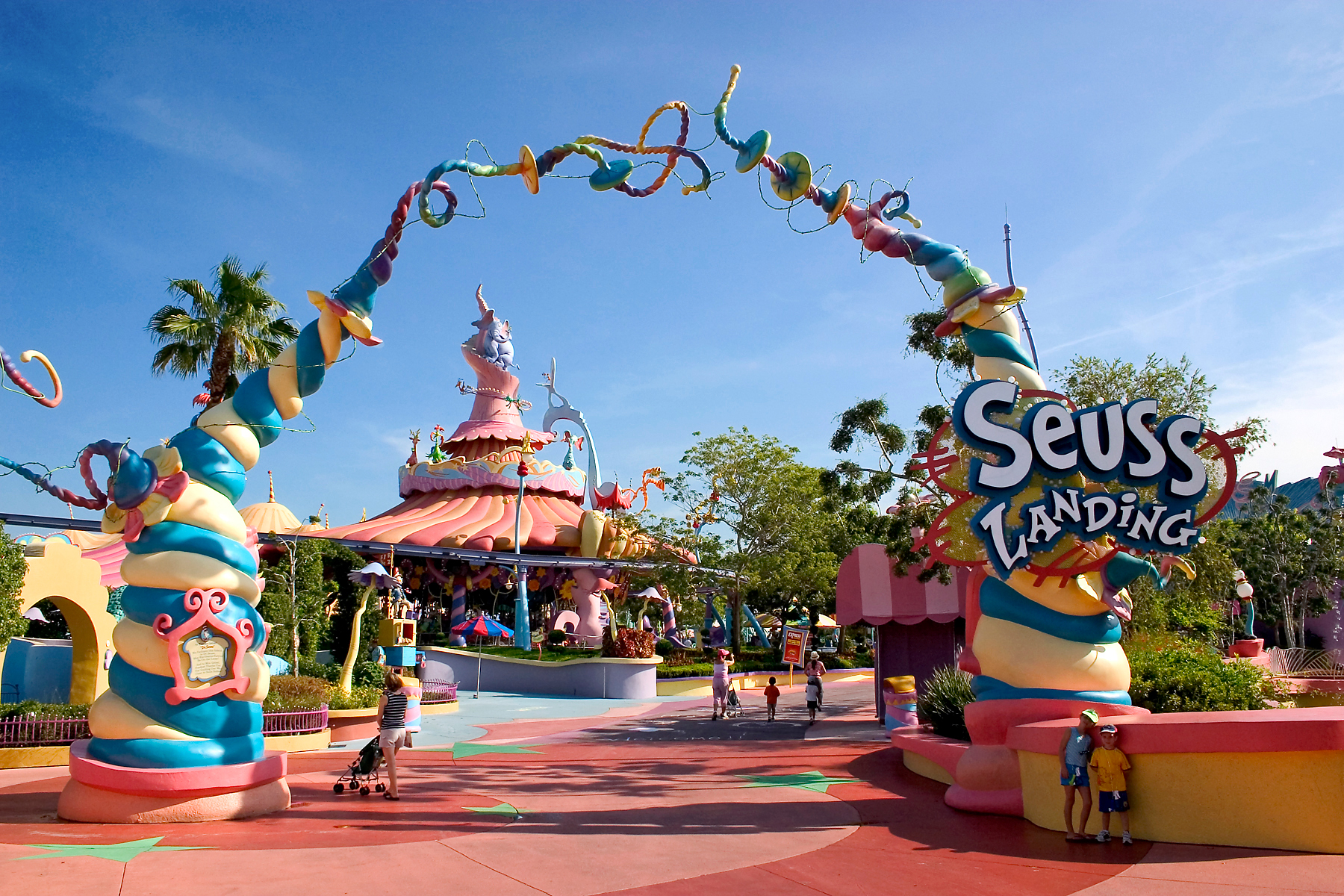
Seuss Landing at Islands of Adventure in Orlando, Florida

For most of his career, Geisel was reluctant to have his characters marketed in contexts outside of his own books. However, he did permit the creation of several animated cartoons, an art form in which he had gained experience during World War II, and he gradually relaxed his policy as he aged.

The first adaptation of one of Geisel's works was an animated short film based on Horton Hatches the Egg, animated at Leon Schlesinger Productions in 1942 and directed by Bob Clampett. As part of George Pal's Puppetoons theatrical cartoon series for Paramount Pictures, two of Geisel's works were adapted into stop-motion films by George Pal. The first, The 500 Hats of Bartholomew Cubbins, was released in 1943. The second, And to Think I Saw It on Mulberry Street, with a title slightly altered from the book's, was released in 1944. Both were nominated for an Academy Award for "Short Subject (Cartoon)".

In 1966, Geisel authorized eminent cartoon artist Chuck Jones—his friend and former colleague from the war—to make a cartoon version of How the Grinch Stole Christmas! The cartoon was narrated by Boris Karloff, who also provided the voice of the Grinch. It is often broadcast as an annual Christmas television special. Jones directed an adaptation of Horton Hears a Who! in 1970 and produced an adaptation of The Cat in the Hat in 1971.

From 1972 to 1983, Geisel wrote six animated specials that were produced by DePatie-Freleng: The Lorax (1972); Dr. Seuss on the Loose (1973); The Hoober-Bloob Highway (1975); Halloween Is Grinch Night (1977); Pontoffel Pock, Where Are You? (1980); and The Grinch Grinches the Cat in the Hat (1982). Several of the specials won multiple Emmy Awards. A Soviet paint-on-glass-animated short film was made in 1986 called Welcome, an adaptation of Thidwick the Big-Hearted Moose. The last adaptation of Geisel's work before he died was The Butter Battle Book, a television special based on the book of the same name, directed by Ralph Bakshi. A television film titled In Search of Dr. Seuss was released in 1994, which adapted many of Seuss's stories.

After Geisel died of cancer at the age of 87 in 1991, his widow Audrey Geisel took charge of licensing matters until her death in 2018. Since then, licensing is controlled by the nonprofit Dr. Seuss Enterprises. Audrey approved a live-action feature-film version of How the Grinch Stole Christmas starring Jim Carrey, as well as a Seuss-themed Broadway musical called Seussical, and both premiered in 2000. In 2003, another live-action film was released, this time an adaptation of The Cat in the Hat that featured Mike Myers as the title character. Audrey Geisel spoke critically of the film, especially the casting of Myers as the Cat in the Hat, and stated that she would not allow any further live-action adaptations of Geisel's books. However, a first animated CGI feature film adaptation of Horton Hears a Who! was approved, and was eventually released on March 14, 2008, to positive reviews. A second CGI-animated feature film adaptation of The Lorax was released by Universal on March 2, 2012 (on what would have been Seuss's 108th birthday). The third adaptation of Seuss's story, the CGI-animated feature film, The Grinch, was released by Universal on November 9, 2018.

Five television series have been adapted from Geisel's work. The first, Gerald McBoing-Boing, was an animated television adaptation of Geisel's 1951 cartoon of the same name and lasted three months between 1956 and 1957. The second, The Wubbulous World of Dr. Seuss, was a mix of live-action and puppetry by Jim Henson Television, the producers of The Muppets. It aired for two seasons on Nickelodeon in the United States, from 1996 to 1998. The third, Gerald McBoing-Boing, is a remake of the 1956 series. Produced in Canada by Cookie Jar Entertainment (now DHX Media) and North America by Classic Media (now DreamWorks Classics), it ran from 2005 to 2007. The fourth, The Cat in the Hat Knows a Lot About That!, produced by Portfolio Entertainment Inc., began on August 7, 2010, in Canada and September 6, 2010, in the United States and is producing new episodes as of 2018. The fifth, Green Eggs and Ham, is an animated streaming television adaptation of Geisel's 1960 book of the same title and premiered on November 8, 2019, on Netflix, and a second season by the title of Green Eggs and Ham: The Second Serving premiered in 2022.

Geisel's books and characters are featured in Seuss Landing, one of many islands at the Islands of Adventure theme park in Orlando, Florida. In an attempt to match Geisel's visual style, there are reportedly "no straight lines" in Seuss Landing.

In 2018 The Hollywood Reporter reported that Warner Animation Group and Dr. Seuss Enterprises had struck a deal to make new animated movies based on the stories of Dr. Seuss. Their first project was a fully animated version of The Cat in the Hat, and was released in November 2026.

== Published works ==
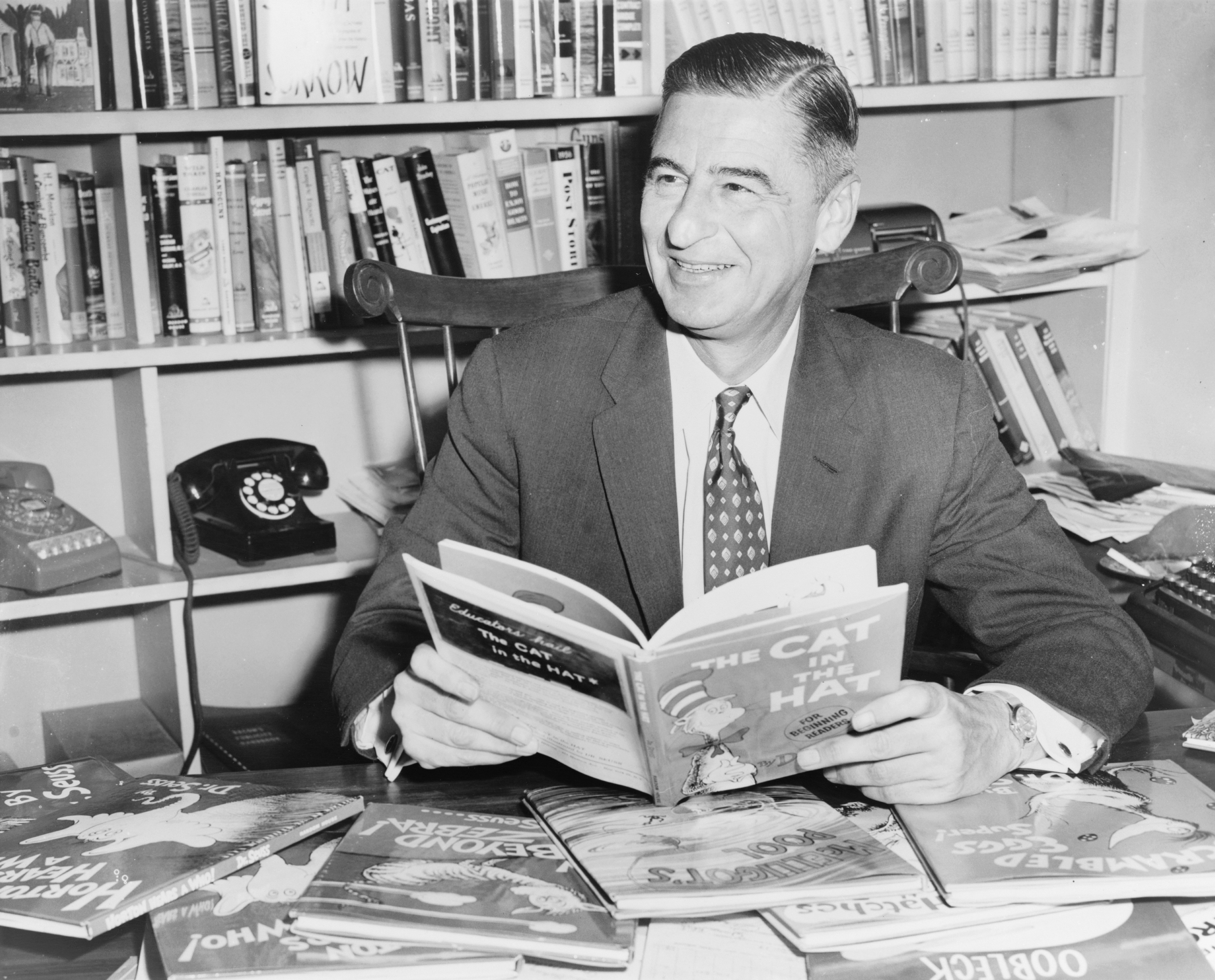
Dr. Seuss with one of his books, 1957

=== Selected works ===
- And to Think That I Saw It on Mulberry Street (1937)
- Horton Hatches the Egg (1940)
- Horton Hears a Who! (1954)
- The Cat in the Hat (1957)
- How the Grinch Stole Christmas! (1957)
- The Cat in the Hat Comes Back (1958)
- One Fish, Two Fish, Red Fish, Blue Fish (1960)
- Green Eggs and Ham (1960)
- The Sneetches and Other Stories (1961)
- Hop on Pop (1963)
- Fox in Socks (1965)
- The Lorax (1971)
- The Butter Battle Book (1981)
- I Am Not Going to Get Up Today! (1987)
- Oh, the Places You'll Go! (1990)
