= Horton Hears a Who! (disambiguation) =

Horton Hears a Who! is a 1954 book by Dr. Seuss.

Horton Hears a Who! may also refer to:

- Horton Hears a Who! (film), a 2008 animated film adaptation of the book
- Horton Hears a Who! (TV special), a 1970 TV special based on the book
