= The Wubbulous World of Dr. Seuss =

American puppet television series

- Genre: Children's television series Surreal humor Preschool; Puppetry
- Based on: Characters by Dr. Seuss
- Directed by: David Gumpel
- Creative director: Ed Eyth
- Presented by: Bruce Lanoil; Martin P. Robinson
- Starring: Anthony Asbury; Stephanie D'Abruzzo; John Kennedy; Kathryn Mullen; Leslie Carrara-Rudolph; Tim Lagasse; Pam Arciero
- Narrated by: Bruce Lanoil; Martin P. Robinson
- Theme music composer: Joe Caroll; Hal J. Cohen; David Steven Cohen
- Opening theme: Wubbulous Street (Season 1); Come on Along (Season 2)
- Ending theme: Wubbulous Street (Season 1, instrumental); Just Shout Hooray (Season 2, pre-credits); Come on Along (Season 2, credits, instrumental)
- Composers: Joe Caroll; Mark Gray; Peter Thom; Steve Klapper; Hal J. Cohen; Zina Goldrich; David Steven Cohen
- Country of origin: United States
- Original language: English
- No. of seasons: 2
- No. of episodes: 40

Production
- Executive producers: Michael K. Frith; David Steven Cohen; Stephanie Simpson (Season 2); Brian Henson; Jonathan C. Meath
- Producers: Jonathan C. Meath; David Gumpel
- Production location: Jim Henson's carriage house (Season 1)
- Running time: 30 minutes
- Production companies: Dr. Seuss Enterprises; The Jim Henson Company; Nickelodeon Productions

Original release
- Network: Nick Jr.
- Release: October 13, 1996 – May 15, 1998

Related
- Gerald McBoing-Boing; The Cat in the Hat Knows a Lot About That!; Green Eggs and Ham; Go, Dog. Go!

The Wubbulous World of Dr. Seuss is an American children's puppet television series based on characters created by Dr. Seuss, produced by The Jim Henson Company. It aired from October 13, 1996, to May 15, 1998 on Nickelodeon's preschool block, Nick Jr.. It combines live-action puppets with digitally animated backgrounds, and in its first season, refashioning characters and themes from the original Dr. Seuss books into new stories that often retained much of the flavor of Dr. Seuss' own works.

== Format ==
In many respects, seasons one and two of the program are very different shows. The two seasons have completely different intro and outro credit sequences and songs reflecting their differing orientations. The virtual settings seen in this show are created by Jim Henson's Creature Shop.

=== Season 1 ===
Each episode is a self-contained story based on Dr. Seuss characters such as Yertle the Turtle and Horton the Elephant. The unifying element is that the stories are introduced and commented on by The Cat in the Hat (performed by Bruce Lanoil) who serves as host of the show. Occasionally, The Cat in the Hat himself appears in the episode, reprising his role as a bit of a trickster, as in his original eponymous books (ex. episode 1.6: "The Simplifier").

The season is notable for hewing closely to many of the themes of the original Dr. Seuss stories, with each episode possessing a strong moral overtone.

=== Season 2 ===
For season 2, the show was reworked to reflect more traditional children's programming. The Cat in the Hat (now performed by Martin P. Robinson) lives in a playhouse with his Little Cats A through Z and the often flustered Terrence McBird (performed by Anthony Asbury). The Cat in the Hat is no longer a trickster and instead has assumed the role of a friendly and enthusiastic host who is helpful, nurturing and sweet. Aside from the residents of the house, there are frequent visitors based on Dr. Seuss characters.

Each episode revolves around a theme (such as family, health, art) and features one or two songs about the theme. A closing song was also added at the end of each episode. The action shifts between The Cat in the Hat and what is going on in his playhouse and shorter related story interludes, which he shows to the audience by means of his "Wubbuloscope". These story vignettes take place in various locations like:

- Seussville – a contemporary city where Sarah Hall Small and her family live.
- Jungle of Nool – a jungle that is home to Horton the Elephant, Morton the Elephant-Bird, Jane Kangaroo, Junior Kangaroo, Yertle the Turtle, the Wickershams, and the Sneels.
- Kingdom of Didd – a Renaissance-like kingdom that is ruled by King Derwin.
- Mount Crumpit – home of the Grinch and his dog Max.

Writers hired for the season included Adam Felber and Mo Rocca. A similar episode format was featured in The Jim Henson Company's next children's program Bear in the Big Blue House, which aired on Disney Channel.

== Characters ==
=== Main ===
- The Cat in the Hat (performed by Bruce Lanoil in Season 1 and Martin P. Robinson in Season 2) is the main protagonist and host of the series. He starts out as a trickster, then becomes a more nurturing and optimistic host.
- The Little Cats debuted in The Cat in the Hat Comes Back.
  - Little Cat A (performed by Kathryn Mullen in Season 1 and Leslie Carrara-Rudolph in Season 2) – seen as one of the Cat in the Hat's sidekicks.
  - Little Cat B (performed by Stephanie D'Abruzzo) – seen as one of the Cat in the Hat's sidekicks.
  - Little Cat C (performed by John Kennedy) – seen as one of the Cat in the Hat's sidekicks.
  - Little Cat F (performed and voiced by Pam Arciero) – seen in Season 2 at the Cat in the Hat's playhouse.
  - Little Cat N (performed by Pam Arciero) – seen in Season 2 at the Cat in the Hat's playhouse.
  - Little Cat P (performed by Tim Lagasse) – seen in Season 2 at the Cat in the Hat's playhouse.
  - Little Cat S (performed by Stephanie D'Abruzzo) – seen in Season 2 at the Cat in the Hat's playhouse.
  - Little Cat Z (performed by Anthony Asbury) – seen in Season 2 at the Cat in the Hat's playhouse. He is the smallest of all and mutters Z-words.
  - Little Cat Fleep (performed by Kevin Clash) is an indifferent little cat who only speaks in fleeps.
- Terrence McBird (performed by Anthony Asbury) is a bird that joins the main cast in Season 2. He is the cats' roommate, and is often grumpy throughout his daily activities in each episode until the end.

=== Supporting ===
- The Grinch (performed by Anthony Asbury) – he appeared in How the Grinch Stole Christmas!. He likes to dampen other people's fun and pleasure for his own vile and sadistic amusement. He serves as one of the two main antagonists of Season 1 (along with Yertle the Turtle), despite appearing in four episodes, and the main antagonist of Season 2.
- Max the Dog (performed by Kathryn Mullen in Season 1 (The Guest) and Stephanie D'Abruzzo in Season 2) – he appeared in How the Grinch Stole Christmas!. Max is the Grinch's long-suffering yet loyal dog.
- Fox in Socks and Knox in Box (performed by Bruce Lanoil in Season 1 and Tim Lagasse in Season 2 and John Kennedy respectively) – they came from Fox in Socks. Fox is lively and Knox is moody and easily annoyed.
- Yertle the Turtle (performed by Anthony Asbury) – Yertle is a turtle who tries to be king of anything, and usually uses other characters to his advantage. He serves as one of the two main antagonists of Season 1 (along with the Grinch, due to having more episodes than him), and redeems himself, becoming a recurring character in Season 2.
- Horton the Elephant (performed by John Kennedy) – he appeared in Horton Hatches the Egg and Horton Hears a Who!. He is a friendly, humble and steadfast elephant who often receives ridicule for believing in things that no one else does.
- Morton the Elephant-Bird (performed by Kathryn Mullen in Season 1 and Leslie Carrara-Rudolph in Season 2) is a Horton's half-bird son who appeared in Horton Hatches the Egg.
- Jane Kangaroo (performed by Stephanie D'Abruzzo) – she appeared in Horton Hears a Who!. She is a very snobbish and strict kangaroo who is portrayed in this series in a more sympathetic light than her book counterpart.
- Junior Kangaroo (performed by Kathryn Mullen in Season 1 and Tim Lagasse in Season 2) – he appeared in Horton Hears a Who! and is the son of Jane Kangaroo. By season 2, he and Morton have become friends.
- Thidwick the Big-Hearted Moose (performed by Anthony Asbury) is a moose who is very loving and sweet. In this show, Thidwick is also Horton the Elephant's adoptive younger brother and Morton the Elephant-Bird's adoptive uncle as seen in "The Birthday Moose". Thidwick was later dropped from the show at the end of Season 1.
- The Wickersham Brothers (performed by John Kennedy, Anthony Asbury, and Bruce Lanoil) is a family of apes who come from Horton Hears a Who! and are often employed by Jane Kangaroo and/or Yertle the Turtle.
- Sarah Hall Small (performed by Stephanie D'Abruzzo) is a girl who is a resident of Seussville. She debuted during the second season.
- Sam-I-Am (performed by John Kennedy) – he appeared in Green Eggs and Ham. He appeared in Season 2 where he would often lend a hand to the Cat in the Hat.
- Pam-I-Am (performed by Stephanie D'Abruzzo) is a female counterpart of Sam-I-Am and expert repair girl. The Cat in the Hat often summons her by calling on her on the Pam Phone, using her number's phone signals he calls "The Pam Alert", as revealed in "The Sounds All Around". Her motto is "Pam-I-Am, fix it I can!
- Matthew Katroom (performed by Anthony Asbury) is a boy who is a resident of Seussville and is good friends with Sarah Hall Small.
- King Derwin (performed by Anthony Asbury) is the King of the Kingdom of Didd who came from The 500 Hats of Bartholomew Cubbins.
- Princess Tizz (performed and voiced by Leslie Carrara-Rudolph) is the daughter of King Derwin.
- Milo (performed by John Kennedy) is a boy who resides in the Kingdom of Didd and serves as King Derwin's page.
- Norval the Fish (performed by John Kennedy) – he appeared from You're Only Old Once! Norval would appear in different roles in the show. Around Season 2, Norval would work as an advisor to the King Derwin of the Kingdom of Didd.

=== Minor ===
- Mayor Stovepipe (performed by Kathryn Mullen) is the mayor of Seussville who appeared in season 1.
- The Birthday Bird (performed by John Kennedy) appeared in Happy Birthday to You! He lives in Katroo and he likes to celebrate birthdays.
- Sally Spingel-Spungel-Sporn (performed by Camille Bonora in "The Muckster" and Stephanie D'Abruzzo in "Max the Hero" and "Horton Has a Hit") is a news reporter who came from The Cat in the Hat Song Book.
- Sue Snue (performed by Stephanie D'Abruzzo) is a girl who is a resident of Seussville and appeared in season 1.
- The Yapper-Nap (performed by John Kennedy) is a monster likes to take naps in Seussville.
- A Snark is a pink bird that appears and lives in the Jungle of Nool. She is seen in Season 2. The Snark is a recycled version of Shirley from The Muppet Show.
- Sneels (performed by Kathryn Mullen, Heather Asch, Bruce Lanoil and Stephanie D'Abruzzo) is a race of green and pink furry creatures that live in the Jungle of Nool. They were previously used as background cave creatures in Fraggle Rock, as well as its animated series, but had different eyes here. Their babies, years after the adults debuted on the aforementioned production, also debuted here.
- Mick Maputo Bird (performed by Anthony Asbury) is an Elvis Presley-themed bird that lives in the Jungle of Nool who is also seen in season 2. He sings "Out in the Jungle" in the episode "The Cat in the Hat's Indoor Picnic".
- Lester McBird (performed by Joey Mazzarino) is Terrence McBird's twin brother who is very sensitive towards things he doesn't like and speaks in an upper English accent.

== Episodes ==
=== Series overview ===
Season	Episodes	Originally released	
Season	Episodes	First released	Last released
1	20	October 13, 1996	August 17, 1997
2	20	March 9, 1998	May 15, 1998

=== Season 1 (1996–97) ===
No. overall	No. in season	Title	Directed by	Written by	Original release date	Prod. code
1	1	"The Gink"	David Gumpel	Belinda Ward	October 13, 1996	105
2	2	"Who Are You, Sue Snue?"	David Gumpel	Annie Evans (s); Will Ryan (t)	October 20, 1996	106
3	3	"The King's Beard"	David Gumpel	Will Ryan	October 27, 1996	103
4	4	"The Song of the Zubble-Wump"	David Gumpel	David Steven Cohen	November 3, 1996	115
5	5	"The Guest"	David Gumpel	Carin Greenberg Baker (s) & Craig Shemin; Will Ryan (t)	November 10, 1996	107
6	6	"The Simplifier"	David Gumpel	Lou Berger	November 24, 1996	102
7	7	"The Snoozer"	John Leo	David Cohen	November 17, 1996	108
8	8	"Mrs. Zabarelli's Holiday Baton"	John Leo	Craig Shemin	December 15, 1996	104
9	9	"The Mystery of Winna-Bango Falls"	Scott Preston	Allan Neuwirth & Gary Cooper	January 5, 1997	109
10	10	"Almost There"	David Gumpel	Craig Shemin	February 2, 1997	111
11	11	"Oh, The People You'll Meet"	John Leo	Will Ryan	February 9, 1997	110
12	12	"The Blag-Bludder Beast"	David Gumpel	Phil Lollar	March 2, 1997	112
13	13	"The Muckster"	David Gumpel	Bill Marsilii	March 23, 1997	113
14	14	"Norval the Great"	David Gumpel	Will Ryan	March 30, 1997	114
15	15	"Max the Hero"	Scott Preston	David Cohen	July 13, 1997	101
16	16	"The Road To Ka-Larry"	John Leo	Craig Shemin & Will Ryan	July 20, 1997	116
17	17	"Yertle the King"	John Leo	Phil Lollar	July 27, 1997	117
18	18	"Horton Has a Hit"	David Gumpel	Bill Marsilli	August 3, 1997	118
19	19	"The Birthday Moose"	David Nebel	Will Ryan & Craig Shemin	August 10, 1997	119
20	20	"The Grinch Meets His Max"	David Gumpel	Craig Shemin & Will Ryan	August 17, 1997	120
20	20	"Halfway Home to Malmaroo"	David Gumpel	David Steven Cohen	August 17, 1997	120

=== Season 2 (1998) ===
No. overall	No. in season	Title	Directed by	Written by	Original release date
21	1	"The Cat in the Hat Takes a Nap"	Emily Squires & David Gumpel	Stephanie Simpson	March 9, 1998
22	2	"The Cat in the Hat Cleans Up His Act"	David Gumpel	Adam Felber	March 17, 1998
23	3	"The Cat in the Hat's Big Birthday Surprise"	Emily Squires & Kathy Mullen	Mo Rocca	March 10, 1998
24	4	"The Sounds All Around"	Steve Feldman & David Gumpel	Jay Martel	March 11, 1998
25	5	"Make Yourself at Home in the Cat's Playhouse"	Steve Feldman & David Gumpel	Jonathan Greenberg	March 12, 1998
26	6	"The Cat in the Hat's Flower Power"	Jim Martin & Rick Velleu	Mo Rocca	March 18, 1998
27	7	"The Feed You Need"	Jim Martin & David Gumpel	Adam Felber	March 16, 1998
28	8	"The Cat in the Hat's First-First Day"	David Gumpel	Jay Martel	April 7, 1998
29	9	"The Cat in the Hat Gets a Package"	Jim Martin & Kathy Mullen	Alana Burgi	March 13, 1998
30	10	"The Cat in the Hat's Indoor Picnic"	Emily Squires & Rick Velleu	Mo Rocca	March 31, 1998
31	11	"There Is Nothing To Fear In Here"	David Gumpel	Adam Felber	April 20, 1998
32	12	"The Cat in the Hat Builds a Door-a-Matic"	Emily Squires & Rick Velleu	Jay Martel	April 2, 1998
33	13	"A Bird's Best Friend"	David Gumpel	Adam Felber	April 23, 1998
34	14	"The Cat in the Hat's Art House"	Emily Squires & Kathy Mullen	Mo Rocca	April 27, 1998
35	15	"Lester Leaps In"	Emily Squires & Kathy Mullen	Adam Felber	April 10, 1998
36	16	"A Bird's Guide To Health"	Emily Squires & Kathryn Mullen	Marcello Picone	May 1, 1998
37	17	"Talkin' with the Cat"	Kathy Mullen & Emily Squires	Mo Rocca	May 4, 1998
38	18	"Walkin' with the Cat"	David Gumpel & Rick Velleu	Adam Felber	May 7, 1998
39	19	"The Cat in the Hat Helps a Friend"	David Gumpel, Dean Gordon & Anthony Asbury	Michael Bernard	May 13, 1998
40	20	"Cat's Play"	David Gumpel & Kathy Mullen	Stephanie Simpson	May 15, 1998

== Puppeteers ==
- Bruce Lanoil – The Cat in the Hat (1996–1997), Fox in Socks (1996–1997), Alonzo, Announcer, Aunt May, Barney Balaban, Big Nosed Whozit, Big-Bottomed Rumpit, Bob the King of the Wickershams, First Mate, Grandpa Mullally, Green-Tufted Sneel (in "Yertle the King"), The Grinch's Singing Voice (in "The Guest"), Haji, The Hum-Bleeper, King Noogle of Nug, Larry Nooly, Little Wimpy Guy (puppetry only), Mayor's Servant, Money Whozit, Morton's Pink Friend, Mr. Webley, Newsboy, Onlooker #2, Pa Blozzit, Ronald Q. Clark, Yertle the Turtle (assistant in "The King's Beard"), Singing Classmate in Play, Subscription-Selling Whozit, Tiger, Uncle Dutter, Unhappy Man, The Wickershams, Zander, Zauber
- Martin P. Robinson – The Cat in the Hat (1998), Civil Servant #1, Civil Servant #2, Civil Servant #5, Civil Servant #6, The Milk, The Old Man, Goober the Dog, Paul Hall Small, Yertle the Turtle (assistant in "A Bird's Best Friend"), Friver McGee, Flying Dog, Oven
- Anthony Asbury – Terrence McBird, Little Cat Z, The Grinch, Yertle the Turtle, Thidwick the Big-Hearted Moose, Matthew Katroom, King Derwin, Mr. Hall Small, 8th Birthday Glurk, Bald Eagle with Toupee, Benjamin, Bullfrog, Charlie, Dad Tidbiddle, Footman, Gink, Grandpa Jacob Kangaroo, Little Guy in Machine, Mick Maputo Bird, Morris Nooly, Morton's Purple Friend, Mrs. Zabarelli, Onlooker #3, The Royal Herald, Singing Classmate in Play, Uncle Bocks, Uncle Schmeeze, Voice from Globe, Waldo F. Sterling, The Wickershams
- Stephanie D'Abruzzo – Little Cat B, Little Cat S, Jane Kangaroo, Max the Dog (1997-1998), Pam-I-Am, Sarah Hall Small, Admiral Abigail Breeze, Annie DeLoo, Backup Singer, Bunny, The Cheese, Civil Servant #4, Megan Mullally, Dolores Nooly, Dr. Gazeat, Elise, Eskimo Kid, Fiona Phish, Goofy Gargaloof, Green-Tufted Sneel, Happy Announcer, Heather Tidbiddle, Iguana from Xanadu, Lady Fretibula, Lady from "Up With Folks", Lulu, Ma Blozzit, Mandy, Mom Jalloo, Morton's Yellow Friend, Mrs. Dorfman, Nola Nicola Raphaella Miraldo, Poodle That Doodles, Sally Spingel-Spungel-Sporn (in "Max the Hero" and "Horton Has a Hit"), Space Creature, Sue Snue, Tallullah, The Travel Poohbah, Web-Footed Batula, White-Tuffted Floozle Bird
- John Kennedy – Little Cat C, Horton the Elephant, Mr. Knox, Norval the Fish, Sam-I-Am, Felix Finkledooper, Milo, Alvin, Announcer, Armand, Backup Singer, The Birthday Bird, Celli, Delivery Bird, Downer Than Down Whozit, Earl, Flitzpizzle, The Grinch (assistant in "The Guest" and "There is Nothing to Fear in Here"), Hairy, Herbie Tidbiddle, Horace P. Riddley, Irish Setter, Julian Jeremy Jaroo Jalloo, King Lindy of Lime, Little Wimpy Guy (voice), Man from "Up With Folks", McZuff, Money Whozit, Mr. Dorfman, Muckster, Narrator, Nervous Whozit, Picnic Bug, Raffle Ticket-Selling Kid, Rock Singer, Royal Archer, Singing Lion, Spaceman, Thaddeus, Uncle Docks, Uncle Dutter (assistant), Uncle Norton the Elephant, The Wickershams, Yapper-Nap
- Kathryn Mullen – Little Cat A (1996–1997), Junior Kangaroo (1996–1997), Max the Dog (1996, The Guest), Morton the Elephant Bird (1996–1997), The Grinch (assistant in "The Guest"), Aunt Mertle, Babs Balaban, Backup Singer, Civil Servant #3, Daisy's Mom, Disgusted Guest, Down Whozit, Eliza Jane Dorfman, Finnegan, Gertrude, Hopwood, Mayor Stovepipe, Molly Livingood, Mom Tidbiddle, Money Whozit, Mrs. Otissia Buttons, Onlooker #1, Number One, Phone Operator, Pink-Tufted Sneel, Princess Mindy, Queen Regina of Ka-Larry, The Sandwich, Singing Classmate in Play, Squirrel, The Teacher, Tubby Tarbaloot, Verma
- Leslie Carrara-Rudolph – Little Cat A (1998), Morton the Elephant Bird (1998), Princess Tizz, Mrs. Hall Small, Grandma Hall Small, Grox, Sadie the dog
- Tim Lagasse – Little Cat P, Fox in Socks (1998), Junior Kangaroo (1998), Annoying Greebles, Ben, Bunky Balaban, The Clam, Eskimo Kid, The Grinch's Right Hand Puppeteer (in "The Song Of the Zubble Wump"), Mr. Moriarty Seagoin Eccles, Old Man Time, Scotty, Sid Spider, The Speaker, Smooch Smooch the pooch, Weasel from Sleezeldoo, Mink, Civil Servant #9
- Pam Arciero – Little Cat F, Little Cat N, Lulu's Dog, Zubble-Wump, Snake, Mama Gink
- Bill Barretta – Uncle Berklummer
- Joey Mazzarino – Elwood the Jester (in "The King's Beard"), Lester McBird (in "Lester Leaps In")
- Vicki Eibner – Puffy the Cat (in "Cat's Play"), Snooty Bird
- Heather Asch – Sneels
- Nikki Tilroe – Civil Servant #7, Poochie the poodle
- Brian Meehl – Binkham Tamino McDoyal the Third
- Camille Bonora – Sally Spingel-Spungel-Sporn (in "The Muckster")
- Jim Kroupa – Annoying Greebles, Dad Jalloo, Doily-Carte, Mr. Wimpletwerp, Space Creature, Zippedy Quick
- Jerry Nelson – Snoozer
- John Tartaglia – Bird ( in "The King's Beard"), Delivery Man
- Kevin Clash – Little Cat Fleep

== Home video releases ==
The series was never systematically issued to home video on either VHS or DVD. Some VHS tapes were distributed by Columbia TriStar Home Video in 1999. Current DVD releases contain three episodes per disc and are a mix of episodes from the first and second seasons.

In 2015, the whole series was released on DVD from Shock Entertainment in Australia.

== Syndication ==
Nickelodeon and Nick Jr. aired the series from October 13, 1996, to 1998, with reruns airing until February 6, 2000.

Starz Kids & Family began carrying reruns of the series in 2018.

As of July 2025, the series is featured on the Yippee TV streaming service.

== Later appearances ==
- The puppet used for Annie DeLoo was later used in It's a Very Merry Muppet Christmas Movie, for Billy in episode 17 of Statler and Waldorf: From the Balcony, in Puppet Up! alongside the Flitzpizzle and another Whatnot from this show as well as other productions including The Happytime Murders.
- Each of the Whozits have appeared as different characters in Mopatop's Shop, and years after the purchase of The Muppets, started appearing in Henson Alternative productions.
- One of the Wickersham Brothers was seen on a couple of Sesame Street segments, the "Jump" song (with India Arie) on the Happy Healthy Monsters resource video, and as the Nascount Greasemonkey from Episode 4154.
