= James Kemp =

James, Jim, or Jimmy Kemp may refer to:

== Religion ==
- James Kemp (bishop) (1764–1827), Episcopal bishop in America
- James Kemp (missionary) (1797–1872), missionary for the Church of England
- James W. Kemp (1950s–2006), Methodist minister and author

== Sports ==
- James William Young Kemp, better known as Hamish Kemp, Scottish rugby player
- Jimmy Kemp (born 1971), former CFL quarterback
- Jimmy Kemp (cricketer) (1918–1994), New Zealand cricketer
- Jim Kemp (Australian rules footballer) (born 1947), Australian footballer
- Gabby Kemp (James Albert Kemp, 1919–1993), American baseball player
- Jim Kemp (sprinter) (born 1944), winner of the 600 yards at the 1967 USA Indoor Track and Field Championships

== Others ==
- James Kemp (Australian politician) (1833–1873), member of the New South Wales Parliament
- James Furman Kemp (1859–1926), American geologist
- James Kemp (NAACP) (1912–1983), American labor organizer and president of the NAACP

== See also ==
- James Kempt (1764–1854), British Army officer of the Napoleonic era
