= In Search of Dr. Seuss =

1994 American television film

- Written by: Keith R. Clarke
- Directed by: Vincent Paterson
- Starring: Kathy Najimy; Matt Frewer; Christopher Lloyd; Graham Jarvis; Brady Bluhm; Andrea Martin; David Paymer; J. D. Daniels; Patrick Stewart; Billy Crystal; Andraé Crouch; Bright Eyes; Robin Williams; Eileen Brennan
- Composer: Steve Goldstein
- Country of origin: United States
- Original language: English

Production
- Producers: Keith R. Clarke; Joni Levin; Thomas A. Walsh
- Cinematography: Michael Lonzo
- Editor: Michael Kelly
- Running time: 90 minutes
- Production companies: Turner Pictures; Point Blank Productions

Original release
- Network: TNT
- Release: November 6, 1994

In Search of Dr. Seuss is a 1994 American television film chronicling the adventures of a news reporter, Kathy Lane (Kathy Najimy), who enters the world of Dr. Seuss by opening a magical book. Also starring (in order of appearance) are Matt Frewer, Christopher Lloyd, Andrea Martin, David Paymer, Patrick Stewart, Andraé Crouch, Robin Williams and Eileen Brennan. The film premiered on TNT on November 6, 1994.

== Plot ==
Kathy Lane, a reporter, goes to Theodor Geisel's La Jolla, California, home and meets a strange character. Kathy tells him that the editor of The Ferncrest Times demands from her an article on Dr. Seuss. When she uses him as a source, the character reveals himself to be the Cat in the Hat. Kathy finds a magical book labeled, "Open a book, open your imagination", which pulls her into the world of Dr. Seuss. The Cat in the Hat shows Kathy a political cartoon that would become The Sneetches. The Cat leads Kathy to a door that leads to a beach. On the beach, they read The Sneetches. The Cat tells Kathy about Seuss being a target during World War I. She ends up in a kitchen in which she meets Mr. Hunch from Hunches in Bunches. They eat lunch and learn more about his childhood. Mr. Hunch shows her a book based on his childhood, McElligot's Pool.

Kathy notices Horton the Elephant and ends up in a jungle. She reads Horton Hatches the Egg. The Cat in the Hat appears and tells her about Seuss in the 1920s. Kathy wanders into "The World of Advertising". The Ad Man and Ad Woman explain Dr. Seuss in the advertising business. The room rocks and Kathy is transported to Mulberry Street, where she meets Marco. She helps Marco to devise a story to tell his father after he walks home from school.

The story changes as Kathy and Marco add exciting things to it. The story starts out as a horse pulling a cart. But it turns into a tale with an elephant, the mayor, planes with confetti, a Raja, a band playing music, and more. Marco keeps the story as a horse pulling a cart. He leaves.

Sgt. Mulvaney brings Kathy to a revolving door that is shown to represent the way people rejected Dr. Seuss's first book for publishing. The Sergeant disappears through the door. Kathy follows but ends up in a hall with the Cat in the Hat. The Cat explains to Kathy some of Dr. Seuss's dark political cartoons. An alarm sounds and he disappears. Kathy walks into a room and meets The Voice of America. The Voice of America shows Kathy the documentary, Hitler Lives, which was made by Geisel and his wife.

The Voice of America further reveals that Dr. Seuss's initial drawings of Yertle the Turtle depicted the character with a Hitler-esque mustache and a Nazi uniform. A live-action version of the story is shown in a gospel song. Kathy meets again with the Cat in the Hat, who tells her his own origin story as told by a father reading to his two daughters. After the story, Kathy ends up in the story of Green Eggs and Ham, in which she is chased by multiple Sam-I-Ams who attempt to make her eat green eggs and ham. Kathy ends up in the mountains where the Grinch had lived. A woman reads to her How the Grinch Stole Christmas!.

Kathy shows up at the Street of the Lifted Lorax, where the Cat tells her that while the Grinch was professionally successful for Dr. Seuss, his personal life was not, and he explains what happened to Seuss during the late 1960s. She put in a payment (15 cents, a nail, and the shell of a great, great, great grandfather snail) written on paper in a bucket, after which The Once-Ler hoisted up the bucket with all those things, collected them, brought down a speaker, and told the story of The Lorax. After planting a new Truffula Tree, marching music sounded, indicating a butter battle that represented The Butter Battle Book.

Kathy and The Cat in the Hat visit the library, at which they sing Oh, the Places You'll Go!, after which they are transported back to Dr. Seuss's house. Dr. Seuss is quoted: "I hope for the children a world of peace and they would never lose their sense of wonder and discovery. From there to here, from here to there. Funny things are everywhere."

== Cast ==
- Kathy Najimy as Kathy Lane
- Matt Frewer as The Cat in the Hat
- Christopher Lloyd as Mr. Hunch
- Graham Jarvis as The Farmer
- Brady Bluhm as Marco (McElligot's Pool)
- Frank Welker dubbed the voices of Horton the Elephant, Mayzie the Bird, Morton the Elephant-Bird, the Mouse, the Elephant Hunters, Chief Yookeroo, Van Itch and the re-dubbed Hitler Lives Narrator
- David Paymer as the Ad Man
- Andrea Martin as the Ad Woman
- J. D. Daniels as Marco (Mulberry Street)
- Patrick Stewart as Sgt. Mulvaney
- Billy Crystal as Radio Voice (The Voice of America)
- Andraé Crouch as Yertle the Turtle
- Bright Eyes as Mack
- Robin Williams as The Father
- Zelda Williams and Eleanor Columbus as The Daughters
- Howie Mandel as Sam-I-Am Voice-Over
- Eileen Brennan as The Who-Villian
- Malachi Pearson as Additional Voice-Over
- Terry Lindholm as Once-ler (hands)
- Kay E. Kuter as the voice of Dr. Seuss

=== Uncredited ===
- Paul Winchell as some of the Sneetches (voice, archive footage)
- Boris Karloff as the Grinch (voice, archive footage)
- June Foray as Cindy Lou Who (voice, archive footage)
- Bob Holt as the Once-ler, the Lorax, Sylvester McMonkey McBean, and some of the Sneetches (voice, archive footage)
- Charles Durning as Grandfather Yook (voice, archive footage and redubbed lines)
- Joseph Cousins as Grandson (voice, archive footage)

== Stories featured ==
The film features many of Dr. Seuss's stories, although they are edits of older adaptations, while some of the adaptations are newly created live-action versions. It also includes some of his political work, including excerpts of his short subject, Hitler Lives.

1. The Sneetches (originally from DePatie-Freleng Enterprises's special, Dr. Seuss on the Loose, and was re-edited; 1973)
2. Hunches in Bunches (live-action)
3. McElligot's Pool (live-action)
4. Horton Hatches the Egg (originally a Merrie Melodies cartoon produced by Leon Schlesinger Productions in 1942 and directed by Bob Clampett; this cartoon is re-edited and re-dubbed by Frank Welker)
5. And to Think That I Saw It on Mulberry Street (originally a 1944 George Pal Puppetoon; re-edited and retold by J. D. Daniels)
6. Hitler Lives (short documentary by Warner Bros. in 1945; re-edited and re-dubbed by Frank Welker)
7. Yertle the Turtle (live-action)
8. The Cat in the Hat (live-action)
9. Green Eggs and Ham (live-action)
10. How the Grinch Stole Christmas! (originally the famous Chuck Jones television special created in 1966; this cartoon is not only re-edited, but the story is retold by Eileen Brennan, while Boris Karloff and June Foray remain the voices of The Grinch and Cindy Lou Who)
11. The Lorax (originally created by DePatie-Freleng Enterprises in 1972; the present-day scenes of the Once-ler are re-created in live-action)
12. The Butter Battle Book (originally created by Ralph Bakshi in 1989; some of the verses that were omitted from the special, or were not properly spoken for the telling of the book, are added in this version and voiced by Charles Durning, who reprised his role as the grandfather, Frank Welker and Malachi Pearson)
13. Oh, the Places You'll Go! (live-action)

== Home media ==
Nearly two months before the television premiere on TNT, Turner Home Entertainment released In Search of Dr. Seuss directly to VHS on September 14, 1994, and re-released it on June 6, 1995, the same date as the home-video releases of Ralph Bakshi's The Butter Battle Book and Hanna-Barbera's Daisy-Head Mayzie. Simultaneously, Turner combined the films on a LaserDisc release with an exclusive distribution by Image Entertainment. On November 18, 2003, the film arrived on DVD for the first time, distributed by Warner Home Video. In March 2008, In Search of Dr. Seuss, Daisy-Head Mayzie, The Butter Battle Book, and the 1942 Merrie Melodies short, Horton Hatches the Egg, were included as bonus features on the deluxe DVD release of MGM Animation/Visual Arts's Horton Hears a Who!.
