= Horton the Elephant =

Fictional character created by Dr. Seuss

- Horton as drawn by Dr. Seuss, from Horton Hears a Who!
- First appearance: Horton Hatches the Egg (1940)
- Created by: Dr. Seuss
- Designed by: Dr. Seuss
- Portrayed by: Kevin Chamberlin (Seussical)
- Voiced by: Kent Rogers (1942 film); Mel Blanc (sneezing in 1942 film); Marvin Miller (1947 record); Hans Conried (1970 special); Skip Hinnant (1976 record); Frank Welker (In Search of Dr. Seuss); John Kennedy (The Wubbulous World of Dr. Seuss); Jeffrey Draper (Dr. Seuss Preschool); Jim Carrey (2008 film); Ethan Monaghan (Horton!)

In-universe information
- Species: Elephant
- Gender: Male
- Significant other: Gertrude McFuzz (Seussical)
- Children: Morton the Elephant-Bird (adoptive son)

Horton the Elephant is a fictional character from the 1940 book Horton Hatches the Egg and 1954 book Horton Hears a Who!, both by Dr. Seuss. He is also featured in the short story Horton and the Kwuggerbug, first published for Redbook in 1951 and later rediscovered by Charles D. Cohen and published in the 2014 anthology Horton and the Kwuggerbug and More Lost Stories. In all books and other media, Horton is characterized as a kind, sweet-natured, and naïve elephant who manages to overcome hardships.

In 1942, Warner Bros. made the animated short film, Horton Hatches the Egg, in which Horton is voiced by Kent Rogers.

In 1970, MGM Animation/Visual Arts made a 30-minute TV special of Horton Hears a Who!. Horton is voiced by Hans Conried, who also lends his voice as the narrator.

Horton is voiced by Jim Carrey in the 2008 animated film Horton Hears a Who, where he is shown as being eccentric and imaginative, and somewhat absent-minded. Carrey had previously played and voiced the Grinch in How the Grinch Stole Christmas, another Seuss adaptation involving the Whos.

Horton is also a character in the TV series The Wubbulous World of Dr. Seuss, as performed by John Kennedy. Horton is also a principal character in Seussical (2000), which uses most of the two Horton books as its primary plot. Kevin Chamberlin originated the role of Horton on Broadway.

== Other in-universe characters ==
=== Horton Hatches the Egg ===
- Mayzie: A lazy bird who convinces Horton to sit on her egg, while she relaxes on Palm Beach. When Horton and his egg (which are now part of a traveling circus) visit near Palm Beach, she demands the egg back, until it hatches into an "elephant-bird". In the Broadway musical production of Seussical, her full name is given as Mayzie LaBird.
- Hunters: Three game hunters who planned to shoot Horton, but decided to sell him to the circus to display his ability to climb trees. In the Seuss book, they are illustrated as gentlefolk, but in the 1942 cartoon, they look more like Yosemite Sam or Elmer Fudd.
- Morton the Elephant-Bird: A small animal resembling a winged elephant and looking quite similar to Horton; was hatched by Horton from Mayzie's egg and was later adopted and raised by Horton. In Seussical, the elephant-bird hybrid is not given a name, but Gertrude McFuzz offers to help adopt and raise him. He was actually not given a confirmed first name until The Wubbulous World of Dr. Seuss.

=== Horton Hears a Who! ===
- The Sour Kangaroo: An egotistical grumpy kangaroo and the head of the Jungle of Nool who mistrusts Horton's inquisitive nature as stupidity and does not believe that the Whos and Whoville exist, and attempts to destroy its locus in an attempt of convincing Horton. In the animated special and The Wubbulous World of Dr. Seuss, she is named "Jane Kangaroo". She is voiced by Carol Burnett in the film.
- The Young Kangaroo: The Sour Kangaroo's young joey, who supports his mother in all her speeches. In the film, he is named Rudy, and he believes in the Whos. In the animated special and The Wubbulous World of Dr. Seuss, he is named Junior. He is voiced by Josh Flitter in the film.
- Mayor of Whoville: The mayor of the microscopic world of Whoville; Horton's principal contact therein, and the source of information thereof. In the film, the mayor is named "Ned McDodd" and is the latest of a long lineage of mayors, and is the father of 96 daughters and a son. In the animated special, he is replaced with a scientist character named Dr. Hoovey. He is voiced by Steve Carell in the film.
- The Wickersham Brothers: A group of bonobo/gibbon-like monkeys who work for the Sour Kangaroo and steal the flower upon which Whoville rests. They have a very large family, who help bind Horton. The main brother in the group is voiced by Dan Fogler in the film.
- Vlad Vladikoff: A black eagle that takes the flower that Horton protects and drops it in a huge patch of identical flowers. In the animated special of Horton Hears a Who!, his name is changed to Whizzer McWoff, and he appears more like a vulture than an eagle. Voiced by Will Arnett in the film adaptation, he speaks in a Russian accent, and is truly a vulture yet made to resemble a condor.
- JoJo: One of the Whos: a small boy who, when exhorted by the Mayor, announces Whoville's existence to the larger world by shouting "YOPP". In Seussical, and the subsequent film, he is the Mayor's son; in the former, he bonds with Horton over being “Alone in the Universe,” and in the latter, he is voiced by Jesse McCartney.

=== Seussical ===
- Gertrude McFuzz: Although her original story did not feature Horton at all, Gertrude is a prominent character throughout the musical Seussical, in which she is Horton's next-door neighbor who falls in love with him due to his big heart. To attract Horton's attention, she artificially grows an impractically large tail. She helps Horton by locating the Who's in the clover patch and rescuing him from the circus, and in the end agrees to help Horton raise and adopt the elephant-bird (a half-elephant calf, half-bird chick), teaching him about being both an elephant and a bird.
- General Genghis Kahn Schmitz: Although his original story did not feature Horton at all, the musical showcases him as a significant member of the town of Whoville on Horton's clover, serving as head of a war similar to the one in The Butter Battle Book.
- The Grinch: Although his original story did not feature Horton at all, he is also showcased in the musical as a significant member of Whoville on Horton's clover, reenacting the story of how he became a nicer creature every Christmas.
- Judge Yertle the Turtle: Although his original story did not feature Horton at all, he appeared towards the end of the musical sentencing Horton to a mental institution for his actions until they were proven true.

=== Horton and the Kwuggerbug ===
- The Kwuggerbug: A rude Kwuggerbug who enlists Horton to bring him to a tree full of delicious nuts, promising give him half when they get there, but forces him to undertake various hardships along the way while not intending to keep his word.

== Stories ==
Horton Hatches the Egg: Mother bird Mayzie lays an egg, but becomes weary of incubating it, and persuades Horton to take her place. As Horton spends months at this, he suffers rainstorms, snowstorms, and the mockery of the other animals, while Mayzie relaxes abroad. When three hunters approach him, Horton defies them to shoot him, while refusing to leave the nest. The hunters, realizing they have found a rare attraction—an elephant sitting on a nest—dig up the tree and sell him to a circus. When the circus arrives in Palm Beach, Mayzie goes to Horton demanding the return of her egg, but when the egg hatches, it produces a hybrid elephant-bird, who returns with Horton to the wild.

Horton Hears A Who!: Horton is bathing in a pond when he hears a speck of dust emit cries for help and places it on a red clover for safety. Upon investigating, he learns that the speck of dust is a microscopic world named Whoville, inhabited by a microscopic species called Whos. When he talks to the Whos, the Sour Kangaroo and her son brand Horton as insane to the entire animal kingdom. When Horton retains the Whos, the Wickersham Brothers steal the clover and request Vladikoff to dispose of it, whereupon Vladikoff discards the clover among a field of identical plants. After a day of searching, Horton locates Whoville, but Mother Kangaroo arrives with an army of monkeys, to imprison him and destroy the clover. When the Kangaroos fail to hear a chorus of Whos announcing their presence, the monkeys attack Horton, who shouts at the Whos to prove themselves. All their efforts fail, though, until the Who child, JoJo, shouts the syllable "YOPP!", breaking the sound barrier. The monkeys and Kangaroo apologize to Horton and promise to cooperate with him in protecting Whoville.

Horton and the Kwuggerbug: Horton walks through the jungle when he meets a Kwuggerbug, who tells him about a Beezlenut tree and offers to give him half the nuts if he brings him there. Horton, wanting the Beezlenuts, agrees. However, the bug turns out to be rude and demanding, and forces Horton to swim across a lake infested with crocodiles and climb a treacherous mountain to get to the tree on top, where he is then forced to stretch over a ledge to the tree to allow the bug to get to the nuts. When the bug gets the nuts, he cracks them, then points out that half of every nut is the shell, and he intends to give Horton the shells while he gets the insides. He jams the shells into Horton's trunk. Horton, in anger, and in pain from the shells in his trunk, sneezes, blowing the bug so far away he can never get back to the Beezlenut tree.

== Other media ==
- Horton Hatches the Egg was made into a 10-minute cartoon for Looney Tunes in 1942 created by Bob Clampett. This was the first cinematic adaptation of a Dr. Seuss book.
- Horton Hears a Who! was made into a 1970 animated TV special directed by Chuck Jones, two short films produced in Ukraine and Russia respectively, and a 2008 CGI feature film by Blue Sky Studios.
- Both Horton books are part of the main plot in the 2000 musical Seussical. Horton is one of the main characters.
- The character lent its name to the company Hortonworks, founded in 2011.
- Horton! is an animated series that focuses on a child version of Horton. The series was released on Netflix on October 6, 2025.
