= Seussical =

Musical by Lynn Ahrens and Stephen Flaherty

- Music: Stephen Flaherty
- Lyrics: Lynn Ahrens
- Book: Lynn Ahrens; Stephen Flaherty
- Basis: The works of Dr. Seuss
- Productions: 2000 Boston tryout 2000 Broadway; 2002 1st US Tour; 2003 2nd US Tour; 2007 Off-Broadway; 2012 West End; 2016 Off-off-Broadway; 2018 Off West End; 2025 Off-Broadway

Seussical, sometimes called Seussical the Musical, is a musical with lyrics by Lynn Ahrens, music by Stephen Flaherty, and a story co-written by both. It is based on the works of Dr. Seuss, with most of its plot drawing from Horton Hears a Who!, Gertrude McFuzz, and Horton Hatches the Egg. The title is a portmanteau of "Seuss" and "musical". Despite a negative critical reception and significant financial losses during its initial Broadway run in 2000, Seussical has since had a revival in popularity, with two US national tours, a West End production, and numerous adaptations for schools and regional theaters.

== Plot ==
This synopsis describes the tour version of the show, currently being licensed as "Seussical the Musical" by Music Theatre International (MTI). The story follows Horton and Gertrude as they band together to save the Whos, free Horton, and restore peace to the Jungle of Nool. The themes of the show include the power of being unique and the importance of fighting for one's beliefs.

=== Act I ===
The show opens on a bare stage, with an odd red-and-white-striped hat in the center. A small boy wanders into view and notices the hat, wondering to whom it might belong. He finally mentions the word Cat in the Hat, who appears before the Boy and tells him he has been brought to life by the Boy's "Thinks". The Cat urges this boy to Think up the "Seussian" world and characters around the boy and himself ("Oh, the Thinks You Can Think!"). The Cat then reveals to the Boy that he is about to tell a story about someone as imaginative as the Boy is.

To begin the story, the Cat encourages the Boy to think up the Jungle of Nool, where Horton the Elephant is bathing. Horton hears a strange noise coming from a nearby speck of dust, and reasons that someone must be on it, calling out for help. He carefully places the speck on a soft clover and decides to guard it ("Horton Hears a Who"). But he is mocked mercilessly by the Sour Kangaroo and the other animals of the jungle, who do not believe him ("Biggest Blame Fool"). The only exceptions are Horton's bird neighbors, Gertrude McFuzz, who admires his compassion, and Mayzie LaBird, who is more concerned about herself ("Biggest Blame Fool Playoff").

Horton soon discovers that the speck is actually a microscopic planet populated by creatures called Whos. The citizens of Who-ville introduce themselves and their yearly Christmas pageant directed by their friend the Grinch. They also reveal that in addition to being unable to control where the speck flies, they are on the brink of war and their entire population of Truffula Trees has been cut down ("Here on Who"). The Whos thank Horton and ask for his protection, and he agrees to guard their planet.

At this point, the Cat pushes the Boy into the story; he becomes Jojo, the son of the Mayor of Who-ville and his wife. Jojo has been getting into trouble at school for having Thinks, so his parents order him to "take a bath and go to bed, and think some normal Thinks, instead". Jojo blames the Cat for getting him into trouble and tries to send him away. The Cat refuses and persuades Jojo to imagine the tub is McElligot's Pool ("It's Possible"). Jojo inadvertently floods the house, leading the Mayor and his wife to contemplate what to do with their son ("How to Raise a Child"). When the Cat hands them a brochure, they decide to send Jojo to a military school run by General Genghis Khan Schmitz, who is preparing to go to war with those who eat their bread with the butter side down ("The Military"). While there, Jojo meets Horton, and finds a mutual friend in him ("Alone in the Universe").

Gertrude, meanwhile, has fallen in love with Horton, but is afraid he does not notice her because of her own tail, which consists of only "one droopy-droop feather" ("The One Feather Tail of Miss Gertrude McFuzz"). Mayzie advises her to take pills to make her tail grow more feathers, as she did to make her tail enormous, which is why she looks so dazzling. ("Amayzing Mayzie"). Gertrude is so excited that she overdoses, causing her tail to grow long and unwieldy ("Amayzing Gertrude").

Horton is ambushed by the Wickersham brothers, a gang of delinquent monkeys, who steal the clover and make off with it ("Monkey Around"). Horton gives chase until the Wickershams hand the clover to an eagle named Vlad Vladikoff, who drops it into a large patch of identical clovers ("Chasing the Whos"). Here, the Cat cuts briefly into the action to remind the audience how lucky they are to not be Horton ("How Lucky You Are"). Undeterred, Horton begins to look for the clover, hoping the Whos are still alive, when Gertrude catches up with him and tries to get him to notice her new tail. Horton is too busy, so she leaves to take more pills ("Notice Me, Horton").

Horton is about to search his three millionth clover when he loses hope. Mayzie, sitting in a nearby tree, offers to help him forget about the Whos by hatching an egg that she is too lazy to care for ("How Lucky You Are (Reprise)"). Horton reluctantly agrees, and Mayzie leaves for a vacation. Horton sits through months of harsh weather as he tries to decide between the egg and the Whos ("Horton Sits on the Egg") before he is captured by hunters, who take him away along with the entire tree. Gertrude tries to stop the hunters, but cannot fly due to her heavy tail.

The Cat closes the act with a reprise of "How Lucky You Are", and conducts the band during the intermission.

=== Act II ===
Horton, still hatching the egg, is auctioned off to the traveling Circus McGurkus ("Egg, Nest, and Tree"/"Circus McGurkus"/"How Lucky You Are (Reprise)"). At one show in Palm Beach, he meets up with Mayzie, who insists that he keep the egg for himself before leaving ("Amayzing Horton"). Horton mourns the loss of the Whos and Jojo, but vows just as surely to protect the egg, as it, too, is alone without its mother ("Alone in the Universe (Reprise)"), and sings it a lullaby with Jojo about a magical place called Solla Sollew. At the same time, the Mayor and his wife begin to miss Horton and Jojo, and wish for Solla Sollew, as well ("Solla Sollew").

Jojo is with General Schmitz and his platoon as the Butter Battle commences ("Transition to Butter Battle"). Jojo deserts Schmitz, but sprints into a minefield and vanishes in an explosion. Schmitz assumes the worst and heads to Who-ville to tell Jojo's parents that their son has died ("A Message from the Front"). The Cat returns to perform a re-enactment of the dramatic scene. But in reality, Jojo has survived, but is lost with no idea of where to turn. The Cat appears to him with a band of Hunches, encouraging him to use his Thinks to find his way home ("Havin' a Hunch"). Jojo does so and happily reunites with his parents, who forgive him for his Thinks.

Gertrude sneaks into the circus to free Horton, explaining she plucked out all but one of her tail feathers to fly there, and confesses her love for him. She also reveals she has found his clover, delighting and relieving Horton to find the Whos alive and well ("All for You"). However, the Sour Kangaroo and the Wickersham brothers arrive to take Horton back to the jungle.

In the jungle, Horton is put on trial for the crimes of "talking to a speck, disturbing the peace, and loitering... on an egg" ("The People Versus Horton the Elephant"). Aided by Gertrude, Horton makes his best case, but Judge Yertle the Turtle finds him guilty. He orders Horton remanded to the "Nool Asylum for the Criminally Insane" and the clover destroyed in a kettle of hot "Beezle-Nut" oil. Desperate, Horton encourages the Whos to make as much noise as possible to prove their existence, but the animals do not hear them. Jojo finally uses his Thinks to conjure a new word, "Yopp", which he shouts loudly enough to reach the animals' ears. Convinced at last, the animals repent and promise to help protect the Whos, and Horton is acquitted. Jojo is accepted by his parents and the rest of Who-ville as "Thinker Non-Stop" for saving their planet. Horton's egg hatches into a tiny flying "Elephant-Bird", amazing everyone, but dismaying Horton, who panics at the thought of flying progeny. Gertrude reassures him that they can raise the child together, and they agree to do so.

With the story finished, the Cat returns to close the show ("Finale - Oh, the Thinks You Can Think!"), then vanishes along with the scenery, leaving only his hat and Jojo, who is now the Boy again. The Boy picks the hat up, dons it, and says, "Seuss!"

During a curtain call, the company performs a number based on Green Eggs and Ham ("Green Eggs and Ham").

== Cast ==
Character	Boston	Broadway	1st US tour	Off-Broadway	West End	Off-Off Broadway	Off West End
Character	2000		2001	2007	2012	2016	2018
The Cat in the Hat	David Shiner	David Shiner	Cathy Rigby	Shorey Walker	Joe Morrow	Jesse Manocherian	Marc Pickering
The Boy/Jojo	Andrew Keenan-Bolger	Anthony Blair Hall; Andrew Keenan-Bolger†	Drake English; Richard Miron†	Michael Wartella	Clark Devlin	Marc Winski	Anna Barnes
Horton the Elephant	Kevin Chamberlin	Kevin Chamberlin	Eric Leviton	Brian Michael Hoffman	David Hunter	Adrian Rifat	Scott Paige
Gertrude McFuzz	Janine LaManna	Janine LaManna	Garret Long	Karen Weinburg	Kirsty Marie Ayers	Alyson Leigh Rosenfeld	Amy Perry
Mayzie La Bird	Michele Pawk	Michele Pawk	Gaelen Gilliland	Kelly Felthous	Jessica Parker	Ashley Harris	Katie Paine
The Mayor of Whoville	Stuart Zagnit	Stuart Zagnit	Don Stitt	Josh Walden	Philip Scutt	Stephen Foster Harris	Adam Dawson
Mrs. Mayor	Alice Playten	Alice Playten	Amy Griffin	Amelia Morgan-Rothschild	Tanya Shields	Nikki Yarnell	Daisy Steere
The Lorax	Alice Playten	—N/a					
General Genghis Khan Schmitz	Erick Devine	Erick Devine	Stuart Marland	—N/a			
Sour Kangaroo	Sharon Wilkins	Sharon Wilkins	Natasha Yvette Williams	Ebony Marshall-Oliver	Natalie Green	Paula Galloway	Ngozi Ugoh
The Once-ler	Eddie Korbich‡	—N/a					

† In the Broadway production and the 1st US National Tour, the role of Jojo was alternated by two actors.

‡ While the character of The Once-ler was cut from his track after Boston, Eddie Korbich was still a part of the Broadway in the rest of his ensemble track.

=== Notable Broadway replacements ===
- The Cat in the Hat: Rosie O'Donnell, Cathy Rigby
- Jojo: Aaron Carter, Cameron Bowen, Andrew Keenan-Bolger

== Characters ==
=== Major ===
- The Cat in the Hat is a trickster who serves as the narrator of the story and also plays many small roles throughout.
- Jojo is the imaginative and misunderstood young son of the mayor. In touring and licensed productions, the actor who plays Jojo begins as an unnamed boy whom the Cat brings into the story.
- Horton is an elephant whose compassion and determination lead him to follow through on any task.
- Gertrude McFuzz is Horton's next-door neighbor, a shy bird with a short tail who falls in love with Horton and seeks to have her tail made longer to catch his attention.
- Mayzie LaBird is a bird neighbor of Horton and Gertrude with an extravagant tail. She becomes single mother to an unwanted egg that she ultimately gives up to Horton.
- Sour Kangaroo is a mother who seeks to protect her jungle community from strange ideas like Horton's.
- Mr. and Mrs. Mayor are Jojo's parents and the community leaders of Whoville who don't know how to deal with their overimaginative son.
- General Genghis Khan Schmitz is an overbearing military academy instructor who leads his cadets into combat in The Butter Battle (though his original book appearance was in I Had Trouble in Getting to Solla Sollew).

=== Minor ===
- Bird Girls are a group of female birds who act as a Greek chorus.
- Wickersham Brothers are a gang of monkeys who mock Horton and steal the clover.
- The Grinch is a notable resident of Who-ville who is responsible for organizing the Christmas pageant based on the tale of his own redemption.
- Young Kangaroo is the Sour Kangaroo's young joey (often portrayed by a puppet).
- Yertle the Turtle is the judge who presides over the Jungle of Nool's court.
- Vlad Vladikoff, an eagle ally of the Wickershams.
- Citizens of Who-ville, Jungle Creatures, Fish, Cadets, Hunches, Circus Animals, Hunters

== Musical numbers ==
=== Act I ===
- "Overture" – Orchestra/The Boy Who Thinks
- "Oh, the Thinks You Can Think!" – The Cat in the Hat and Company
- "Horton Hears a Who" (Note: Lyrics by Lynn Ahrens and Dr. Seuss) – Bird Girls, Horton the Elephant, and Citizens of the Jungle of Nool
- "Biggest Blame Fool" – Sour Kangaroo, Young Kangaroo, Horton the Elephant, Wickersham Brothers, Bird Girls, Gertrude McFuzz, Mayzie LaBird, Citizens of the Jungle, the Boy and The Cat
- “Biggest Blame Fool Playoff/Gertrude McFuzz” - Gertrude, Wickershams, Bird Girls
- "Here on Who" – The Mayor, Mrs. Mayor, The Grinch, Whos, Schmitz and Horton
- "It's Possible" – JoJo, The Cat in the Hat and Fish
- "How to Raise a Child" – The Mayor and Mrs. Mayor
- "The Military" – General Genghis Khan Schmitz, The Mayor, Mrs. Mayor, JoJo, and Cadets
- "Alone in the Universe" – Horton the Elephant and JoJo
- "The One Feather Tail of Miss Gertrude McFuzz" – Gertrude
- "Amazing Mayzie" – Mayzie LaBird, Gertrude and the Bird Girls
- "Amazing Gertrude" – Gertrude and Bird Girls
- "Monkey Around" – Wickersham Brothers and Horton the Elephant
- "Chasing the Whos" – Horton the Elephant, Sour Kangaroo, Young Kangaroo, Bird Girls, Wickersham Brothers, The Cat in the Hat, Vlad Vladikoff and Whos
- "How Lucky You Are" – The Cat in the Hat and Whos
- "Notice Me, Horton" – Gertrude McFuzz and Horton
- "How Lucky You Are" (Reprise) – Mayzie LaBird and Horton the Elephant
- "Horton Sits on the Egg / Act I Finale" – Full Company

=== Act II ===
- "Entr'acte" (Note: Not present on cast recording) – Cat, Orchestra
- "Egg, Nest, and Tree" – Sour Kangaroo, Bird Girls, Wickersham Brothers, The Cat in the Hat and Hunters
- "The Circus McGurkus" – The Cat in the Hat, Horton and Circus Animals
- "The Circus on Tour" – Horton
- "Mayzie in Palm Beach" – Mayzie LaBird, The Cat Jose the Pool Boy and Horton
- "Amazing Horton" – Mayzie LaBird and Horton
- "Alone in the Universe" (Reprise) – Horton the Elephant
- "Solla Sollew" – Horton, The Mayor, Mrs. Mayor, JoJo, and Circus McGurkus Animals and Performers
- "The Butter Battle" - Genghis Khan-Schmitz, Jojo, Cadets
- "Christmas Pageant/A Message from the Front" - The Grinch, Mr. Mayor, Mrs. Mayor, Genghis Khan-Schmitz, Whos
- "Solla Sollew" (Reprise) - Mr. Mayor and Mrs. Mayor
- "Havin' a Hunch" - Cat, Jojo, Hunches
- "All for You" – Gertrude, Horton, Cat, and Bird Girls
- "The People Versus Horton the Elephant" – Horton, Gertrude, Sour Kangaroo, Wickershams, Bird Girls, Cat, Mr. Mayor, Mrs. Mayor, Jojo, Ensemble
- "Alone in the Universe" (Reprise 2) - Horton, Gertrude
- "Finale" / "Oh, the Thinks You Can Think!" (Reprise) – Full Company
- "Curtain Call" / "Green Eggs and Ham" – Full Company

== Contributing Dr. Seuss books ==
Seussical contains references to the following Dr. Seuss stories:

- And to Think That I Saw It on Mulberry Street
- The Butter Battle Book
- The Cat in the Hat
- Did I Ever Tell You How Lucky You Are?
- Fox in Socks
- Green Eggs and Ham
- Hop on Pop
- Horton Hatches the Egg
- Horton Hears a Who!
- How the Grinch Stole Christmas!
- Hunches in Bunches
- I Had Trouble in Getting to Solla Sollew
- If I Ran the Circus
- If I Ran the Zoo
- The Lorax
- McElligot's Pool
- Oh Say Can You Say?
- Oh, the Places You'll Go!
- Oh, the Thinks You Can Think!
- The Sneetches and Other Stories
- Yertle the Turtle and Other Stories

== Productions ==
=== Pre-Broadway ===
In a reading in New York City, Eric Idle played the Cat in the Hat, and was credited at the time for contributions to the story line. In the Toronto workshop in 2000, coordinated by Livent Inc., Andrea Martin played the Cat in the Hat. Positive early buzz set off a bidding war among New York theatre producers, with Barry and Fran Weissler acquiring the rights. The musical had its out-of-town tryout in Boston, Massachusetts at the Colonial Theatre in September 2000.

An extensive sequence adapting The Lorax was seen in the original script, which involved Jojo meeting the Once-ler (played by Eddie Korbich in Boston) after deserting the army, and receiving the last Truffula Tree seed from him, giving him the courage to save Who-ville. Relevant characters included the Lorax himself as well as Bar-ba-loots, Swomee-Swans, and Humming-Fish, who would all appear and disappear as the Once-ler told his story. The sequence faced numerous difficulties due to the show's already lengthy running time, and was ultimately cut entirely after its Boston tryout.

=== Broadway ===
Seussical opened on Broadway at the Richard Rodgers Theatre on November 30, 2000. It was directed by Frank Galati and choreographed by Kathleen Marshall. Marshall's brother Rob Marshall was hired to direct the show when it returned to Broadway from Boston, though was uncredited. Originally, Catherine Zuber was the costume designer who made costumes as close to Seuss's illustrations as possible, and her costumes were seen in the Boston run. However, for Broadway, Zuber was replaced by William Ivey Long, whose costumes were more realistic and clashed with the Seussian set design. David Shiner played the Cat in the Hat, while Kevin Chamberlin played Horton, Michele Pawk played Mayzie LaBird, Stuart Zagnit and Alice Playten played Mr. and Mrs. Mayor, and Sharon Wilkins played the Sour Kangaroo.

The show received almost universally negative reviews. In January 2001, in response to falling ticket sales, producers brought in Rosie O'Donnell to replace Shiner as the Cat in the Hat for a month-long engagement. O'Donnell also came in because Shiner went on vacation to see his wife in Germany. The move was criticized as stunt casting, but was successful at temporarily boosting ticket sales. After O'Donnell's run ended, Shiner returned to Seussical as the Cat in the Hat in February until March. In March, young pop star Aaron Carter and former Olympic gymnast Cathy Rigby were cast as JoJo and the Cat respectively for short engagements. Due to poor box office, the show closed on May 20 the same year after 198 performances. Its ultimate financial losses were estimated at $11 million, making it one of the worst financial flops in Broadway history.

=== US tours ===
Following the Broadway production, there were two US national tours. Rigby reprised her role as the Cat for the first tour which ran from September 2002 to June 2003. A second non-Equity production toured from 2003 to 2004.

The script for the first tour was reworked extensively after the show's poor showing on Broadway, resulting in the removal or reworking of several songs. The biggest change involved Jojo, who would now initially appear as an anonymous boy imagining the events onstage before the Cat pushed him into the story. Additional dialogue was included, and some songs and their reprises were cut. This version of the show is the one currently licensed by MTI as Seussical the Musical.

=== Off-Broadway ===
A 90-minute Off-Broadway production was staged at the Lucille Lortel Theatre in 2007 by Theatreworks USA. It was directed and choreographed by Marcia Milgrom Dodge. This production was downscaled for the National Tour, which had its last show in spring 2018.

=== West End (London) ===
Seussical opened on the West End at the Arts Theatre on December 4, 2012, presented by Selladoor Worldwide. It returned in 2013.

=== Off West End (London) ===
Seussical opened at the Southwark Playhouse on 22 November 2018, and ran performances until 29 December.

=== South Africa ===
Seussical opened at the Lyric Theatre at Gold Reef Cityon December 20, 2019, for the festive season, presented by AndCoSA &CO.

== One-act versions ==
A one-act version of the Broadway show titled Seussical Jr. has been created as part of MTI's Jr. series. It is intended to be shorter and more accessible for junior high or middle school students, and has an average run time of 60 minutes. For Jr., various songs are cut and shortened; the subplots based on The Butter Battle Book and How the Grinch Stole Christmas!, and their relevant songs and characters, are removed to make the story more understandable for younger audiences, though the Grinch retains one line during the song "Here on Who". General Schmitz is replaced in "Oh, the Thinks You Can Think!" by the Wickersham Brothers. Songs cut include "Our Story Resumes", "The Circus McGurkus", "Havin' a Hunch", the first version of "How Lucky You Are" (although the reprise sung by Mayzie remains), and "The Circus on Tour".

An even shorter version of the show, Seussical KIDS, is also available from MTI. The 30-minute KIDS version is intended for a large cast of young performers. Notable differences between Jr. and KIDS include the introduction of three Cats in the Hats and the removal of the songs "Biggest Blame Fool", "Amayzing Mayzie", and "Notice Me, Horton".

In 2004, Seussical was reworked into a "Theatre for Young Audiences" version. The cast was reduced to 12 actors, with the plot changed to focus more on Horton.

== Awards and honors ==
=== Original Broadway production ===
Year	Award	Category	Nominee	Result
2001	Tony Award	Best Actor in a Musical	Kevin Chamberlin	Nominated
2001	Drama Desk Award	Outstanding Actor in a Musical	Kevin Chamberlin	Nominated
2001	Drama Desk Award	Outstanding Featured Actress in a Musical	Janine LaManna	Nominated
2001	Drama Desk Award	Outstanding Music	Stephen Flaherty	Nominated

=== Original Off-Broadway production ===
Year	Award	Category	Nominee	Result
2008	Lucille Lortel Award	Outstanding Revival		Nominated
2008	Lucille Lortel Award	Outstanding Choreography	Marcia Milgrom Dodge	Nominated
2008	Lucille Lortel Award	Outstanding Costume Design	Tracy Christensen	Nominated
2008	Drama League Award	Outstanding Revival of a Musical		Nominated
