= Yertle the Turtle and Other Stories =

1958 picture book collection by Dr. Seuss

- Author: Dr. Seuss
- Language: English
- Genre: Children's literature
- Published: 1950-51 (Redbook) (renewed in 1979); April 12, 1958 (Random House) (renewed in 1986)
- Publication place: United States
- Media type: Print (hardcover)
- OCLC: 255164
- Preceded by: The Cat in the Hat Comes Back
- Followed by: Happy Birthday to You!

Yertle the Turtle and Other Stories is a picture book collection by Theodor Seuss Geisel, published under his more commonly known pseudonym of Dr. Seuss. It was first released by Random House Books on April 12, 1958, and is written in Seuss's trademark style, using a type of meter called anapestic tetrameter. Though it contains three short stories, it is mostly known for its first story, "Yertle the Turtle", in which the eponymous Yertle, king of the pond, stands on his subjects in an attempt to reach higher than the Moon—until the bottom turtle burps and he falls into the mud, ending his rule.

Though the book included "burp", a word then considered to be relatively rude, it was a success upon publication, and has since sold more than a million copies. In 2001, it was listed at 125 on the Publishers Weekly list of the best-selling children's books of all time.

== Stories ==
=== Yertle the Turtle ===
The eponymous story revolves around Yertle the Turtle, the king of the pond (located on the faraway island of "Sala-ma-sond"), where all the turtles swim happily. Dissatisfied with the stone that serves as his throne (it's too small for him to rule the landscape beyond the pond), Yertle commands the other turtles to stack themselves beneath him so that he can see farther and expand his kingdom, each time marveling at what he believes he now rules. However, the stacked turtles are in pain. A turtle named Mack, who has a checkerboard-style shell and is at the bottom of the pile, is bearing the brunt of the suffering. Mack asks Yertle for a respite, but Yertle just tells him to be quiet. Yertle decides to further expand his kingdom and commands more and more turtles to add to his throne and rises above everything he sees. Mack makes a second request for a respite because the increased weight is now causing extreme pain and hunger to the turtles at the bottom of the pile. Again, Yertle yells at Mack to be quiet. Yertle then notices the moon rising above him as the night approaches. Furious, he decides to call for even more turtles in an attempt to rise above it. Before he can give the command, Mack decides he has had enough. He burps, which shakes up Yertle's throne and tosses the turtle king off the turtle stack and into the water, leaving him "King of the Mud" and allowing the others to once again swim free, "as turtles, and maybe all creatures, should be."

=== Gertrude McFuzz ===
The second story recounts the tale of the "girl-bird" Gertrude McFuzz, who only has one small, plain tail feather and envies Lolla Lee Lou, who has two feathers. She goes to her uncle, Doctor Dake, for something that will make her tail grow. He tries to tell her that her tail is just right for her species, but she throws a tantrum. He gives in, and he tells her where she can find berries that will make her tail grow. The first berry makes her tail exactly like Lolla Lee Lou's, but greed overtakes her. Now wanting to surpass Lolla Lee Lou, she eats the entire vine, causing her tail to grow to an enormous size. But the added weight of too many feathers does not allow her to fly, run, or even walk. Panicked, she yelps repeatedly, while being stuck on the hill. Her uncle, having heard her painful cries for help, sends for many other birds to carry her home and pluck out her tail feathers, which takes a few weeks, causing her to be sore. Though she has only one feather left—as before—she now has "enough, because now she is smarter".

=== The Big Brag ===
The third and final story tells of a rabbit and a bear, who both boast that they are the "best of the beasts", because of the range of their hearing and smelling abilities, respectively. However, they are humbled by a worm who claims he can see all around the world—right back to his own hill, where he sees the rabbit and bear, whom he calls "the two biggest fools that have ever been seen". Then the worm "dived in his hole and went back to his work".

Seuss used similar turtles in an editorial cartoon published in PM on March 20, 1942.

== Publication history ==
External videos
- Panel discussion on "Civil and Human Rights Themes in Dr. Seuss' The Sneetches and Yertle the Turtle", New York Law School, March 1, 2013, C-SPAN

A stack of turtles drawn similarly to those featured in "Yertle the Turtle" first appeared on March 20, 1942, in a cartoon for the New York City newspaper PM, where Seuss worked as an editorial cartoonist. The illustration shows two stacks of turtles forming the letter "V" on top of a large turtle labelled "Dawdling Producers", with a caption reading "You Can't Build A Substantial V Out of Turtles!"

Seuss has stated that the titular character Yertle represented Adolf Hitler, with Yertle's despotic rule of the pond and takeover of the surrounding area parallel to Hitler's regime in Germany. Though Seuss made a point of not beginning the writing of his stories with a moral in mind, stating that "kids can see a moral coming a mile off", he was not against writing about issues; he said "there's an inherent moral in any story" and remarked that he was "subversive as hell". "Yertle the Turtle" has variously been described as "autocratic rule overturned", "a reaction against the fascism of World War II", and "subversive of authoritarian rule".

All three stories in Yertle were originally published in Redbook magazine in the early 1950s, as part of a series of stories that Dr. Seuss wrote for the magazine. These stories proved to be popular, and Geisel decided to put some of them in a book. On September 14, 1956, Geisel signed a contract with Random House for such a book, which would include the story "How Officer Pat Saved the Whole Town" and have the title How Officer Pat Saved the Town and Other Stories. Officer Pat was planned to be published in the autumn of 1957, but it never did get published. On December 18, 1957, the Officer Pat contract was dissolved, and Geisel signed another contract for the publication of Yertle in 1958. The "Officer Pat" story was eventually included in Horton and the Kwuggerbug and More Lost Stories, which was published posthumously in 2014.

The last lines of "Yertle the Turtle" read: "And the turtles, of course ...all the turtles are free / As turtles, and maybe, all creatures should be". When questioned about why he wrote "maybe" rather than "surely", Seuss replied that he did not want to sound "didactic or like a preacher on a platform", and that he wanted the reader "to say 'surely' in their minds instead of my having to say it".

The use of the word "burp"—"plain little Mack did a plain little thing. He burped!"—was also an issue before publication. According to Seuss, the publishers at Random House, including the president, had to meet to decide whether or not they could use "burp" because "nobody had ever burped before on the pages of a children's book". However, despite the publishers' initial worries, it eventually proved to be a hit—in 2001, Publishers Weekly reported that it was 125th on the list of best-selling hardcover children's books in the United States, at just over one million copies.

"This Book is for
The Bartletts of Norwich, Vt.
and for
The Sagmasters of Cincinnati, Ohio"

— Dedication, Yertle the Turtle and Other Stories

The book is dedicated to the Sagmaster family as a tribute to Joseph Sagmaster, who had introduced Seuss to his first wife, Helen Palmer, when they were both attending Oxford University. Sagmaster is quoted as saying that bringing the two together was "the happiest inspiration I've ever had".

== Adaptations ==
Although Yertle the Turtle and Other Stories has not been directly adapted, several characters from the book have appeared in other media. Yertle is a main antagonist in the first season of the 1996–1998 puppetry television series The Wubbulous World of Dr. Seuss (performed by Anthony Asbury), and in Lynn Ahrens and Stephen Flaherty's Broadway musical Seussical, Yertle serves as a judge and Gertrude McFuzz acts as Horton's love interest. The story was also turned into a dance number in the 1994 film In Search of Dr. Seuss with Yertle's lines performed by gospel singer Andraé Crouch.

Yertle the Turtle and Other Stories is a 1992 animation directed by Ray Messecar and narrated by John Lithgow.

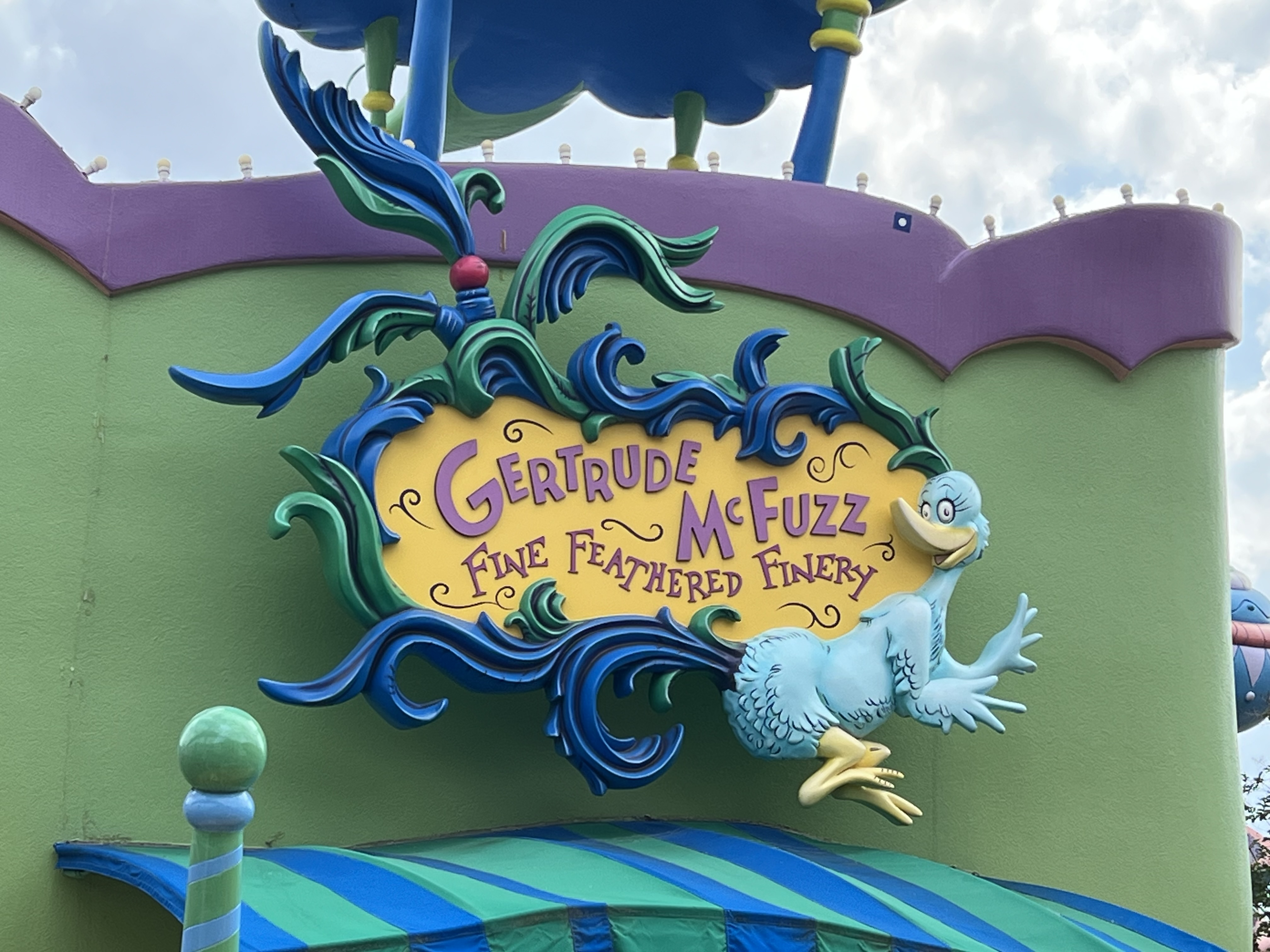
Gertrude McFuzz Fine Feathered Finery

The Red Hot Chili Peppers adapted the story in the song "Yertle the Turtle" on their second album, Freaky Styley, released in 1985.

In 1961, RCA Camden Records released "Yertle the Turtle and Other Stories" with the three stories on the A side and "Bartholomew and the Oobleck" on the B side. The liner notes state "set to dramatic action personally by "Dr. Seuss" with music featuring Marvin Miller".

Universal Islands of Adventure, opened in May 1999, operates the "Gertrude McFuzz Fine Feathered Finery" gift shop in their Seuss-inspired Seuss Landing area.
