= The Lorax =

1971 children's book by Dr. Seuss

- Author: Dr. Seuss
- Illustrator: Dr. Seuss
- Language: English
- Series: 1
- Genre: Children's literature
- Publisher: Random House
- Publication date: August 12, 1971 (renewed 1999)
- Publication place: United States
- Pages: 64
- ISBN: 0-394-82337-0
- OCLC: 183127
- Dewey Decimal: [E]
- LC Class: PZ8.3.G276 Lo
- Preceded by: Mr. Brown Can Moo! Can You?
- Followed by: Marvin K. Mooney Will You Please Go Now!

The Lorax is a children's book written by Dr. Seuss and published in 1971. It chronicles the plight of the environment and the Lorax, the main character, who "speaks for the trees" and confronts the Once-ler, a business magnate who causes environmental destruction.

The story is commonly recognized as a fable concerning the danger of capitalism and humanity's greed causing destruction of the natural environment, using the literary element of personification to create relatable characters for industry (the Once-ler), the environment (the Truffula trees) and environmental activism (the Lorax). The story encourages activism and involvement in making the situation better: a concluding quote from the Once-ler states, "Unless someone like you cares a whole awful lot, nothing is going to get better. It's not." The Lorax exemplifies Dr. Seuss's views on climate change and pollution, teaching children about the importance of doing their part to protect the environment (in this case, Truffula trees).

Dr. Seuss singled out The Lorax as his personal favorite of his books – in it, he managed to create an engaging story highlighting how economic growth is often prioritized over environmental issues. Dr. Seuss stated: "The Lorax came out of me being angry. The ecology books I'd read were dull...In The Lorax I was out to attack what I think are evil things and let the chips fall where they might".

== Plot ==
A young boy living in a town in a gloomy woodland area wanders down the Street of the Lifted Lorax where he meets a mysterious person known as the Once-ler. The boy pays the Once-ler "fifteen cents, a nail, and the shell of a great-great-great-grandfather snail" to hear the tale of how the Lorax was lifted away.

Many years ago, the Once-ler arrived in a beautiful valley teeming with Truffula Trees and playful fauna. Having long searched for a tree like the Truffula, he chopped one down and used its foliage to create a highly versatile garment known as a Thneed. A creature known as the Lorax emerged from the tree's stump and expressed disapproval of the Once-ler's actions. Ignoring the Lorax, the Once-ler sold his Thneed for $3.98 and enlisted the help of his relatives to expand his business.

The Once-ler's shop grew into a large industrial complex, and new machines were built to log the Truffula forest and distribute Thneeds. Over time, the valley was ravaged with pollution, and the Lorax sent the fauna away to find safer habitats. The Once-ler vowed to continue "biggering" his operations until one of his machines felled the last Truffula tree, forcing the factory to close down. The Lorax disappeared into the sky, leaving behind a pile of rocks inscribed with the word "UNLESS". For years afterward, the Once-ler lived in isolation, pondering the Lorax's message.

Upon finishing his story, the Once-ler finally understands the message: change requires action. He gives the boy the last Truffula seed and urges him to cultivate a new forest, hoping that the Lorax and the animals will return.

== Inspiration ==
It is believed that a Monterey cypress in La Jolla, California was the inspiration for The Lorax. In June 2019, the tree was reported to have fallen. Another likely inspiration was the relationship between the patas monkey and the whistling thorn acacia.

== Reception ==
External videos
- Panel discussion on "Business and Society in The Lorax", New York Law School, March 1, 2013, C-SPAN

Based on a 2007 online poll, the National Education Association listed The Lorax as one of its "Teachers' Top 100 Books for Children". In 2012 it was ranked number 33 among the "Top 100 Picture Books" in a survey published by School Library Journal – the second of five Dr. Seuss books on the list.

In a retrospective critique written in the journal inspired by Jerald L, Nature in 2011 upon the 40th anniversary of the book's publication, Emma Marris described the Lorax character as a "parody of a misanthropic ecologist". She called the book "gloomy" and expressed skepticism that its message would resonate with small children in the manner intended. Nevertheless, she praised the book as effective in conveying the consequences of ecological destruction in a way that young children will understand.

In 2012, Travis Scholl evaluated the book in a positive manner and noted the similarities between the Lorax and Biblical prophets. He attributed the similarities to Geisel's Lutheranism.

== Controversy ==
In 1988, a school district in California kept the book on a reading list for second-graders, though some in the town claimed the book was unfair to the logging industry.

In the mid-1990s, Terri Birkett, a member of a family-owned hardwood flooring factory, authored Truax, a 20-page booklet illustrated by Orrin Lundren and published by the National Oak Flooring Manufacturers' Association (NOFMA). Truax offers a logging-friendly perspective; like The Lorax, it consists of a conflict between two people: a logging industry representative who promotes efficiency and re-seeding efforts; and the Guardbark, an anthropomorphic tree who personifies the environmentalist movement. In Truax, the Guardbark behaves like the Onceler, refusing to listen and lashing out; but in the end, he is convinced by the logger's arguments. Truax was criticized for what were viewed as skewed arguments and clear self-interest, particularly a "casual attitude toward endangered species" that answered the Guardbark's concern for them. The book's approach as a more blatant argument instead of one worked into a storyline was also noted.

The line, "I hear things are just as bad up in Lake Erie," was removed more than fourteen years after the story was published after two research associates from the Ohio Sea Grant Program wrote to Seuss about the clean-up of Lake Erie. The line remains in the home video releases of the television special, in the audiobook read by Rik Mayall, and in the UK edition published by HarperCollins Children's Books.

== Legacy ==
Members of the tree genus Dracophyllum have become colloquially known as Dr Seuss trees, due to their similar appearance to truffula trees from the book.

In a deleted scene from the 2008 film Horton Hears a Who! (in which Mayor Ned McDodd, while riding a zipline, is catapulted into the sky, causing him to crash into it, and takes 2 to his office), the Swomee-Swans (flying swans/goose-like birds) appear as animals from the Whoville.

== Adaptations ==
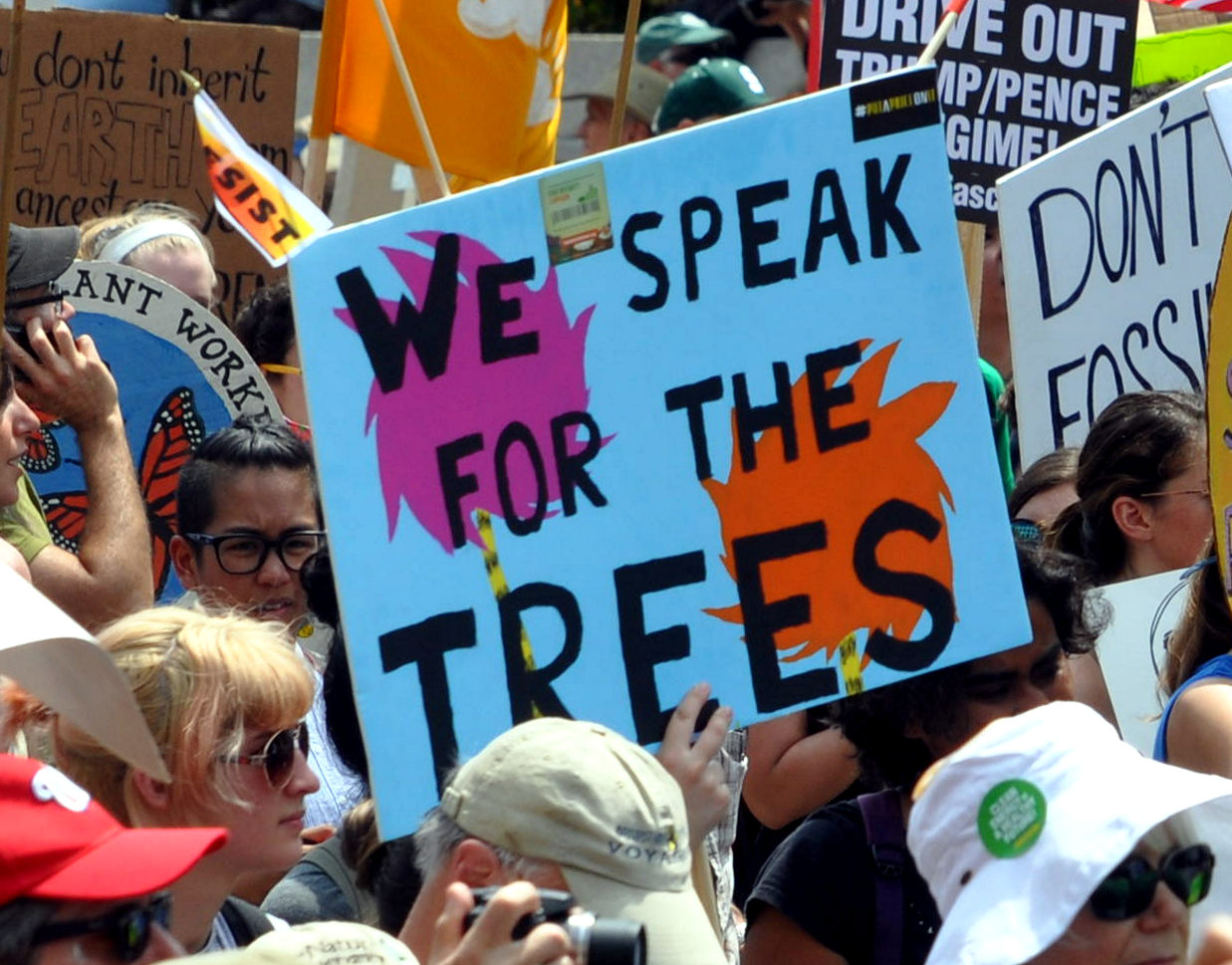
Placard "We speak for the trees", reference to The Lorax, at the People's Climate March (2017)

=== 1972 television special ===
The book was adapted as an animated musical television special produced by DePatie-Freleng Enterprises, directed by Hawley Pratt and starring the voices of Eddie Albert and Bob Holt. It was first aired by CBS on February 14, 1972. A reference to pollution of Lake Erie was spoken by one of the Humming-Fish as they depart; it remains in DVD releases of the show, although later removed from the book. The special also shows the Once-ler arguing with himself, and asking the Lorax whether shutting down his factory (thus putting hundreds of people out of work) is practical. An abridged version of the special is used in the 1994 TV movie In Search of Dr. Seuss, with Kathy Najimy's reporter character hearing the Once-ler's story.

=== 2012 feature film ===
Universal Pictures and Illumination Entertainment released a 3D CGI film based upon the book. The Lorax was released on March 2, 2012, which coincided with the 108th birthday of Seuss, who died at the age of 87 in 1991. The cast includes Danny DeVito as the Lorax, Zac Efron as Ted (the boy in the book), and Ed Helms as the Once-ler. The film includes several new characters: Rob Riggle as villain Aloysius O'Hare, Betty White as Ted's Grammy Norma, Jenny Slate as Ted's neurotic mother Mrs. Wiggins, and Taylor Swift as Audrey, Ted's romantic interest. In addition, the film is given an extended ending where the tree is replanted and the Once-ler reunites with the Lorax. The film debuted in the No. 1 spot at the box office, making $70 million, though it received mixed reviews. The film eventually grossed a domestic total of $214,030,500. Danny DeVito did his role in five different languages, including the original English audio, and also for the Russian, German, Italian, Catalan/Valencian, Castilian Spanish and Latin Spanish dub editions, learning his lines phonetically.

=== Audiobooks ===
Two audio readings have been released on CD, one narrated by Ted Danson in the United States (Listening Library, ISBN 978-0-8072-1873-0) and the other narrated by Rik Mayall in the United Kingdom (HarperCollins, ISBN 978-0-00-715705-1).

=== Musical ===
A musical adaptation of The Lorax was originally included in the script for the Broadway musical Seussical, but was cut before the show opened.

From December 2, 2015, to January 16, 2016, a musical version of the book ran at the Old Vic theatre in London, with former Noah and the Whale frontman Charlie Fink, who also wrote the music for the production.

From July 2 to August 12, 2018, the musical ran at the Old Globe Theatre San Diego, California with Steven Epp as The Once-ler. The role of the hero to be trusted with the last seed, a boy in the original book, was filled by a girl in the musical.

== See also ==
- Deforestation
- Revegetation
- Tragedy of the commons
