= Happy Birthday to You! =

1959 children's book by Dr. Seuss

- Author: Dr. Seuss
- Language: English
- Genre: Children's literature
- Publisher: Random House
- Publication date: August 12, 1959 (renewed in 1987)
- Publication place: United States
- Media type: Print (hardcover and paperback)
- Pages: 64 pages
- Preceded by: Yertle the Turtle and Other Stories
- Followed by: One Fish, Two Fish, Red Fish, Blue Fish

Happy Birthday to You! is a 1959 children's book by Dr. Seuss, the first all-color picture book. The book is dedicated to the author's "good friends" and "The Children of San Diego County".

== Plot ==
It deals with a fantastic land called Katroo, where the Birthday Bird throws the reader an amazing party on their special day. It consists of a running description of a fantastical celebration, narrated in the second person, of the reader's birthday, from dawn to late night.

The celebration includes fantastical and colorful gifts, foods and a whirl of activities all arranged by the Birthday Bird for the reader's birthday. It focuses on the reader's self-actualization and concludes with the happy and exhausted reader falling blissfully asleep.

A popular Seuss paragraph in this book reads: "Today you are you, that is truer than true. There is no one alive who is youer than you".

== Adaptations ==
Although Happy Birthday to You! was not directly adapted, The Birthday Bird appears in an episode of The Wubbulous World of Dr. Seuss.

A film adaption of the book was pitched by John Kricfalusi to Reel FX Animation, but never came to fruition.
