= James W. Kemp =

James W. Kemp (born c. 1955; died September 7, 2006) was a United Methodist pastor and author from Lexington, Kentucky. He is best known for his book The Gospel According to Dr. Seuss.

== Education and career ==
Kemp grew up in Lexington and attended Duke Divinity School. He served as a minister for 15 years before retiring in 1996 due to multiple sclerosis. He became paraplegic, and his speech declined to the point where his mother took dictation for his books, and his wife interpreted for him during interviews.

== Writing ==
His first book was Who Says I'm Dead? and details his struggles with multiple sclerosis, particularly an incident in 2000 when the federal government mistakenly believed he had died. The second was a book of ideas for children's sermons.

While serving as a minister he had often used Seuss stories as illustrations for his sermons, and those sermons were the inspiration for his third book, The Gospel According to Dr. Seuss. He said Theodor S. Geisel (aka Dr. Seuss) had always been his favorite theologian, and his favorite theological book was Horton Hatches the Egg.

The "short, clever new book" has 13 chapters about characters like Sam I Am, Yertle the Turtle, King Derwin of Didd, and the Grinch. In each chapter he summarizes a Seuss story, draws a moral from it, and links the story to Biblical passages or characters.

The book was released in January 2004; by March a second printing had been ordered, and Barnes & Noble featured it as part of a national celebration of Geisel's birthday.

== Death ==
He died September 7, 2006, after living with multiple sclerosis for 20 years. Just before his death he told his family and friends that he wanted them to "put the fun back into funeral" for his memorial service.

== See also ==
- The Gospel According to Peanuts
