= Horton Hears a Who! =

1954 children's book by Dr. Seuss

- Front cover
- Author: Dr. Seuss
- Illustrator: Dr. Seuss
- Language: English
- Genre: Children's literature, picture book
- Publisher: Random House
- Publication date: August 12, 1954 (renewed in 1982)
- Publication place: United States
- ISBN: 0-394-80078-8
- OCLC: 470412
- Preceded by: Scrambled Eggs Super! (publication date); Horton Hatches the Egg (plot and characters)
- Followed by: On Beyond Zebra! (publication date); How the Grinch Stole Christmas! (Whoville wise)

Horton Hears a Who! is a children's book written and illustrated by Theodor Seuss Geisel under the pen name Dr. Seuss. It was published in 1954 by Random House. This book tells the story of Horton the Elephant and his adventures saving Whoville, a tiny town located on a clover, from animals who mock him (namely a kangaroo). The animals attempt to steal the clover from Horton, so Horton goes to great lengths to save Whoville from being placed into a boiling pot of Beezlenut Oil.

"A person's a person, no matter how small" is the most popular line from Horton Hears a Who! and also serves as the major moral theme that Dr. Seuss conveys to his audience. Horton endures harassment to care for and ensure the safety of the Whos, who represent the insignificant. Horton Hears a Who! has been well received in libraries, schools, and homes across the world. The book has been adapted as a 1970 television special and a 2008 animated film by Blue Sky Studios and 20th Century Fox Animation, and much of its plot was incorporated into the Broadway musical production Seussical.

== Background ==
Geisel began work on Horton Hears a Who! in the fall of 1953. It is his second book to feature Horton the Elephant with the first being Horton Hatches the Egg. The Whos would later reappear in How the Grinch Stole Christmas!. The book's main theme, "a person's a person no matter how small", was Geisel's reaction to his visit to Japan, where the importance of the individual was an emerging concept. Geisel, who had harbored strong anti-Japan sentiments before and during World War II, changed his views dramatically after the war and used this book as an allegory for the American post-war occupation of the country. His comparison of the Whos and the Japanese was a way for him to express his willingness for companionship. Geisel strived to relay the message that the Japanese should be valued equally, especially in a stressful post-war era. He dedicated the book to a Japanese friend.

== Plot ==
The book tells the story of Horton the Elephant, who, "On the 15th of May, in The Jungle of Nool", while splashing in a pool, hears a speck of dust talking to him. Horton surmises that a small person-like creature lives on the speck and places it on the top of a red clover, vowing to protect it. He later discovers that the speck is actually a tiny planet, home to a community called Whoville, where microscopic creatures called Whos live. The Mayor of Whoville asks Horton to protect them from harm, which Horton happily agrees to, proclaiming throughout the book, "A person's a person, no matter how small".

Throughout the book, Horton is trying to convince the Jungle of Nool that "a person's a person, no matter how small", and that everyone should be treated equally. In his mission to protect the speck, Horton is ridiculed and harassed by the other animals in the jungle for they don't believe that there can be persons on something that looks like a speck of dust. He is first criticized by the female kangaroo "Sour Kangaroo" and her joey "Young Kangaroo". The splash they make as they jump into the pool almost reaches the speck, so Horton decides to find somewhere safer for it. But the news of his odd new behavior spreads quickly, and he is soon harassed by the "Wickersham Brothers", a group of monkeys (which are probably actually apes). They steal the clover from him and give it to Vlad Vladikoff, a "black-bottomed" vulture-like eagle. Vlad flies the clover a long distance, with Horton in pursuit, until Vlad drops it into the middle of a field of clovers that stretches for hundreds of miles.

After an extremely long search, Horton finally finds the clover (the 3,000,000th flower) with the speck on it. However, the Mayor informs him that Whoville, the town on the speck, is in bad shape from the fall, and Horton discovers that the "Sour Kangaroo" and the Wickersham Brothers (along with their extended family) have caught up to him. They tie Horton up and threaten to boil the speck in a hot steaming kettle of "Beezle-Nut" oil. To save Whoville, Horton implores the little people to make as much noise as they can, to prove their existence. So almost everyone in Whoville shouts, sings songs, and plays instruments, but still no one but Horton can hear them. So the Mayor searches Whoville until he finds a very small shirker named Jo-Jo, who is playing with a yo-yo instead of making funny noises. The Mayor carries him to the top of Eiffelberg Tower, where Jo-Jo shouts out a loud "Yopp!", which finally makes the kangaroo and the monkeys hear the Whos. Now convinced of the Whos' existence, the other jungle animals vow to help Horton protect the tiny community.

== Publication history ==
Horton Hears a Who! was published on August 28, 1954, by Random House Children's Books which is a division of the publishing company Random House. There are four formats of the book that exist including a hardcopy version, a paperback version, an e-book version, and an audio version. There are several editions of the hardcopy version including a "Party Edition" and a 65th-anniversary edition. Dr. Seuss has sold hundreds of millions of copies in over 30 languages of his well-known children's books, which includes Horton Hears a Who!

== Reception and analysis ==
External videos
- Panel discussion on "Shared Interests in Dr. Seuss' Horton Hears a Who", New York Law School, March 1, 2013, C-SPAN

Horton Hears a Who! is written in anapestic tetrameter, like many other Dr. Seuss books. Unlike some of his books, however, Horton contains a strong moral message—"a person's a person, no matter how small"—which Thomas Fensch identifies as "universal, multinational, multi-ethnic. In a word: Equality".

The book unites two polar opposite worlds through Horton's determination, integrity, faithfulness, and bravery.

Horton Hears a Who! received praise for the moral message Dr. Seuss exemplifies through Horton the Elephant. A 2002 news article in the Santa Fe Reporter details comedic performer Susan Jayne Weiss saying, "Horton is the ultimate metaphor for believing in yourself, your mission and what you know to be true, against societal prescriptions to the contrary". Ben Witherington of the Asbury Theological Seminary applauds Dr. Seuss for his work in the characterization of Horton as the elephant fights to show the other animals that even the small people are people deserving of respect and love. Additionally, Witherington commended Dr. Seuss for his disdain for cynicism while proving that the imagination can solve life's troubles.

Peter Tonguette, writing for National Review, lauded the book's intricate and thoughtful rhymes and appealing illustrations defined Seuss's work.

Since the 1980s, the book has been adopted by the United States anti-abortion movement, with some interpreting "a person's a person, no matter how small" as being an allegory for the human fetus. This interpretation has been criticized by Audrey Geisel, the widow of the author, and Karl ZoBell, an attorney for Dr. Seuss Enterprises.

== Adaptations in other media ==
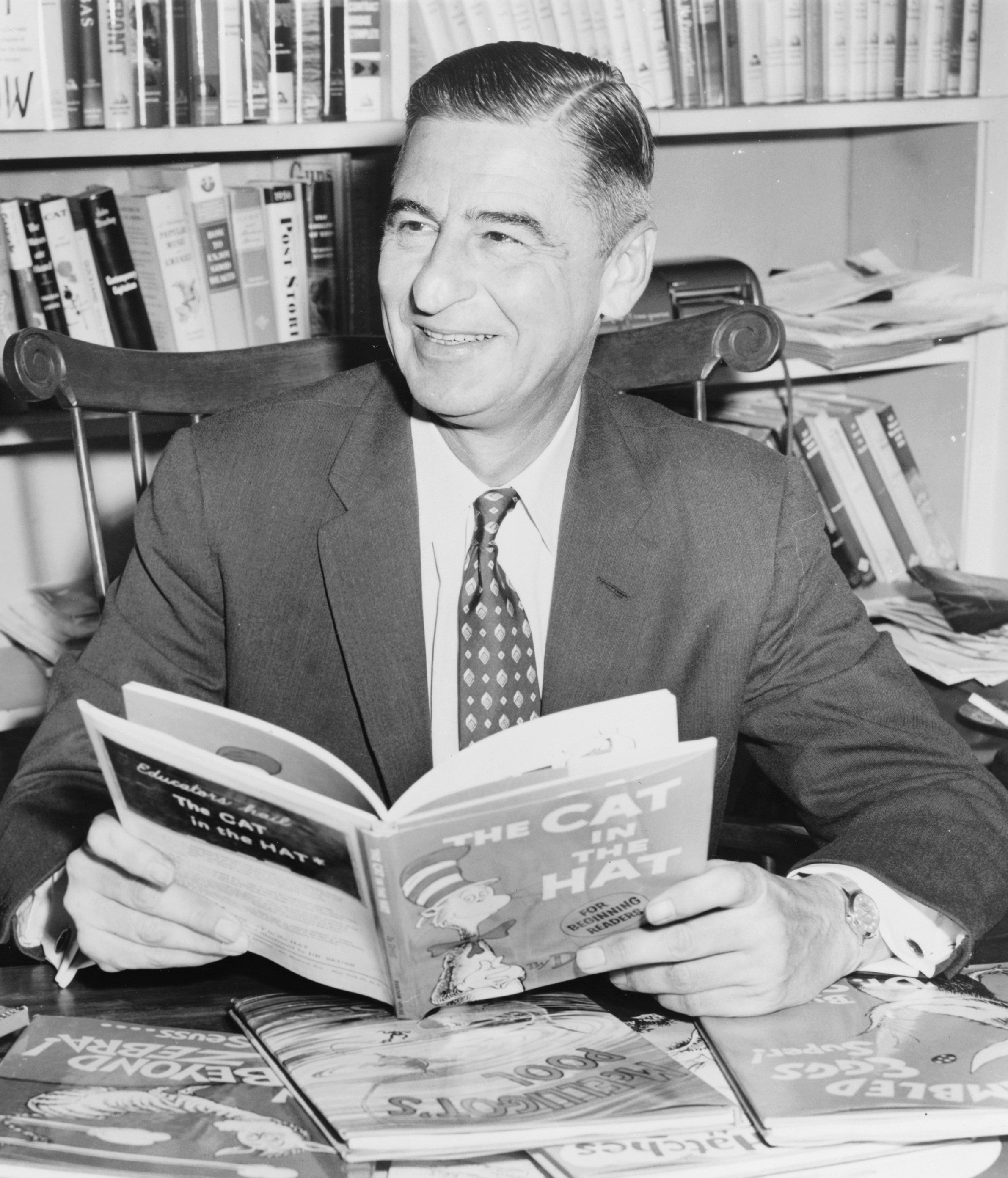
Ted Geisel, who wrote under the pseudonym Dr. Seuss.

=== 1970 television special ===
Horton Hears a Who! was adapted into a half-hour animated TV special by MGM Animation/Visual Arts in 1970. It was directed by Chuck Jones, produced by Theodor Geisel (Dr. Seuss), and narrated by Hans Conried, who also voiced Horton. The Sour Kangaroo (voiced by June Foray)'s name is Jane Kangaroo while her son is named Junior. Horton's contact in Whoville was not the Mayor, but a scientist named Dr. Hoovie who was also voiced by Hans Conried. Vlad Vladikov's name was changed to Whizzer McWoff. Dr. Seuss was awarded a Peabody Award for the animated special Horton Hears a Who!

=== My Friends, Where Are You? (1987 Ukrainian animated short film) ===
In the 1987 Soviet Ukrainian animated Horton Hears A Who short by Kievnauchfilm titled My Friends, Where Are You?, the Whos resemble tiny yellow elves with pointy noises and cone shaped hats.

=== I Can Hear You (1992 Russian short film) ===
In the 1992 Horton Hears A Who Russian animated short titled I Can Hear You!, the Whos are identical to humans and live in a simple agrarian society where they mow grass, work in the mill and rear chickens and horses as microscopic as they are, and Whoville is shown as a small village rather than a city (in contrast to the Jungle of Nool which seems to be a pastiche of 1980s Soviet city life with occasional appearances of modern technology).

=== 2000 stage production ===
The story, along with Horton Hatches the Egg, also provides the basic plot for the 2000 Broadway musical Seussical with "the biggest blame fool in the jungle of Nool", Horton the Elephant, as the main protagonist. Seussical debuted on November 30, 2000, at the famed Richard Rodgers Theatre with high expectations. The music in the play was written by Tony Award winners Lynn Ahrens and Stephen Flaherty. The show flopped and eventually closed six months later on May 20, 2001. Known as one of "Broadway's biggest losers", Seussical lost an estimated 11 million dollars. During its time on Broadway, Seussical's Kevin Chamberlin was nominated for one Tony Award (Best Actor in a Musical).

=== 2008 film ===
Horton Hears a Who! was adapted into a computer-animated feature-length film of the same name in 2008, using computer animation from Blue Sky Studios, the animation arm of 20th Century Fox. The cast includes Jim Carrey, Steve Carell, Carol Burnett, Will Arnett, and Amy Poehler. It was released on March 14, 2008. The film received 18 award nominations including a Kids' Choice Award, Golden Schmoes Award, and Academy of Science Fiction, Fantasy & Horror Films. The film also won the American Society of Composers, Authors, and Publishers Award at the ASCAP Film and Television Music Awards show.

=== Television series ===
A CGI-animated series titled Horton! aimed at preschoolers was released on October 6, 2025 for Netflix. The series was previewed at Annecy International Animation Film Festival in June 2025. It is co-produced with Brown Bag Films.
