= Jim Kemp (Australian rules footballer) =

Australian rules footballer

Personal information
- Full name: James Kemp
- Born: 2 January 1947
- Died: 23 November 2023 (aged 76)
- Height: 188 cm (6 ft 2 in)
- Weight: 78 kg (172 lb)

Playing career
Years	Club	Games (Goals)
1965–67	Fitzroy (VFL)	16 (23)
1968–70	Yarraville (VFA)	32 (89)

Jim Kemp (2 January 1947 – 23 November 2023) was an Australian rules footballer who played with Fitzroy in the Victorian Football League (VFL). Before debuting in the senior side, he played in Fitzroy's under-19s and reserves teams.

After leaving Fitzroy, Kemp kicked 98 goals in 32 games for Yarraville in the Victorian Football Association from 1968 until 1970. He was a lifetime member of Fitzroy.
