= Horton Hatches the Egg (film) =

1942 film by Robert Clampett

- Original title card
- Directed by: Robert Clampett
- Story by: Michael Maltese
- Based on: Horton Hatches the Egg by Dr. Seuss
- Produced by: Leon Schlesinger
- Music by: Carl W. Stalling
- Animation by: Robert McKimson
- Color process: Technicolor
- Production company: Leon Schlesinger Productions
- Distributed by: Warner Bros. Pictures
- Release date: April 11, 1942
- Running time: 9 minutes
- Country: United States
- Language: English

Horton Hatches the Egg is a 1942 American animated comedy short film directed by Robert Clampett. It was released on April 11, 1942. It is part of the Merrie Melodies series and based on the children's book of the same name by Dr. Seuss. It was re-released as a "Blue Ribbon" reissue in 1946, rendering the original film lost, though Clampett kept the title and credit cels.

== Plot ==
Mayzie, a lazy, irresponsible bird, convinces an elephant named Horton to sit on her egg while she takes a "short break". However, free of her commitment, she relocates to Palm Beach.

As Horton sits in the nest on top of a tree, he is exposed to the elements, laughed at by his jungle friends, captured by hunters, forced to endure a terrible sea voyage, and finally placed in a traveling circus. Despite his hardships and Mayzie's clear intent not to return, Horton refuses to leave the nest because he insists on keeping his word, often repeating, "I meant what I said, and I said what I meant. An elephant's faithful, one hundred percent!"

The traveling circus arrives near Mayzie's new Palm Beach residence. She visits the circus just as the egg is due to hatch, after 51 weeks in Palm Beach, and demands that Horton return it, without acknowledging his efforts. However, when the egg hatches, the creature that emerges is an "elephant-bird", a cross between Horton and Mayzie, and Horton and the baby are returned happily to the jungle, while Mayzie is punished for her laziness by ending up with absolutely nothing, much to her anger. Horton and the elephant-bird are happily returning home to the jungle.

== Production ==
In producing the cartoon, Clampett's unit did not use a storyboard, as was the customary practice. Instead, they sketched and wrote additional ideas for the cartoon in Clampett's copy of Seuss' book. Several elements that do not appear in the original book were added to the cartoon include the following:

1. An introductory paragraph, starting with "Now once in a jungle..." and ending with "...up in her tree".
2. A scene where Mayzie uses sex appeal, including (unsuccessfully) shifting her physique to make it appear as if she has large breasts, to lure Horton.
3. Several areas of skipped or re-invented dialogue, such as when Mayzie claims to have bags under her eyes, or when Horton speaks, "Plain as day" to the hunters, except that they only have one gun, which is clearly not aimed at his heart.
4. A fish caricature of Peter Lorre who, at the sight of Horton on the boat, proclaims "Well, now I've seen everything!" before promptly producing a revolver and shooting himself in the head. This scene has been edited or removed from most television prints of the cartoon since the 1980s, due to being considered too violent and unsuitable for younger viewers with the exception of the home media releases and The Bob Clampett Show.
5. A breathy Katharine Hepburn impersonation by Mayzie (featuring her signature lines).
6. A popular nonsense tune of that era, "The Hut-Sut Song" first recorded by Horace Heidt – words and music by Leo V. Killion, Ted McMichael and Jack Owens, sung by Horton and the Elephant-Bird, with the words "and so on so on so forth" replacing some of the lyrics (Horton claims he can't get the words to that song).
7. A mouse that was previously seen in Farm Frolics, another cartoon directed by Clampett and made by Warner Bros. He replaces a planned cameo of Bugs Bunny, who only says "Ah – what's up, Doc?" instead of mocking Horton.

== Voice cast ==
- Kent Rogers as Horton the Elephant / Rosebud the Mouse / Fish / Giraffe
- Sara Berner as Mayzie the Bird / Elephant-Bird
- Frank Graham as Narrator / Tall Hunter
- Mel Blanc as Horton sneezing / Small Hunter
- Bob Clampett as Medium Hunter
- Bill Days, Max Smith, Thurl Ravenscroft, John Rarig, Paul Taylor as Vocal Singing Group

== Home media ==
- (1991) LaserDisc – The Golden Age of Looney Tunes, Vol. 1, Side 4: Bob Clampett
- (1991) VHS – The Golden Age of Looney Tunes, Vol. 4: Bob Clampett
- (1999) VHS – Looney Tunes: The Collectors Edition, Vol. 7: Welcome to Wackyland (USA 1995 Turner print)
- (2000) VHS – The Best of Dr. Seuss (USA 1995 Turner print)
- (2003) DVD – The Best of Dr. Seuss
- (2008) DVD – Looney Tunes Golden Collection: Volume 6, Disc 4
- (2008) DVD – Dr. Seuss' Horton Hears a Who Deluxe Edition
- (2025) Blu-ray – Looney Tunes Collector's Vault: Volume 1, Disc 2
- (2026) DVD/Blu-ray – Dr. Seuss: Classic TV Treasures Collection, Disc 1
