= Horton Hears a Who! (film) =

2008 film by Jimmy Hayward and Steve Martino

Dr. Seuss' Horton Hears a Who!
- Theatrical release poster
- Directed by: Jimmy Hayward; Steve Martino
- Screenplay by: Cinco Paul; Ken Daurio
- Based on: Horton Hears a Who! by Dr. Seuss
- Produced by: Bob Gordon; Bruce Anderson
- Starring: Jim Carrey; Steve Carell; Will Arnett; Seth Rogen; Dan Fogler; Isla Fisher; Jonah Hill; Jamie Pressly; Amy Poehler; Charles Osgood; Carol Burnett
- Edited by: Tim Nordquist
- Music by: John Powell
- Production companies: 20th Century Fox Animation; Blue Sky Studios
- Distributed by: 20th Century Fox
- Release date: March 14, 2008
- Running time: 86 minutes
- Country: United States
- Language: English
- Budget: $85 million
- Box office: $298.6 million

Dr. Seuss' Horton Hears a Who! (Note: Also known as Horton Hears a Who! or simply Horton) is a 2008 American animated adventure comedy film based on the 1954 children's book by Dr. Seuss. Produced by 20th Century Fox Animation and Blue Sky Studios, the film was directed by Jimmy Hayward and Steve Martino, and written by Cinco Paul and Ken Daurio. It stars the voices of Jim Carrey as Horton the Elephant and Steve Carell as Mayor Ned McDodd, alongside Will Arnett, Seth Rogen, Dan Fogler, Isla Fisher, Jonah Hill, Jamie Pressly, Amy Poehler, Charles Osgood, and Carol Burnett. The plot follows Horton, an eccentric elephant who discovers the city of Whoville, led by Mayor McDodd, on a tiny speck. Horton begins a journey to take the speck to safety while a group of animals led by the Kangaroo attempt to stop him.

The film is the fourth screen adaptation of the book, following the 1970 Chuck Jones television special, the 1987 Soviet animated short, and the 1992 Russian animated short. Production began in 2005 after executive producer Chris Meledandri secured the rights to the book from Seuss's widow Audrey Geisel, who provided the studio with Seuss's original sketches and materials and was credited as an executive producer. Recurring Blue Sky collaborator John Powell composed the film's musical score.

Horton Hears a Who! was released theatrically in the United States on March 14, 2008, by 20th Century Fox. The film was well-received by critics, who praised its writing, visuals, and faithfulness to the source material, and grossed $298 million on a budget of $85 million. Horton Hears a Who! was the first Dr. Seuss screen adaptation to be animated in CGI and the second to feature Carrey after How the Grinch Stole Christmas (2000).

== Plot ==
In the Jungle of Nool, Horton the Elephant, the jungle's eccentric nature teacher, hears a tiny yelp coming from a floating dust speck. Believing that an entire society of microscopic creatures are living on that speck, he gives chase to it before placing it on top of a flower. Horton finds out the speck harbors the city of Whoville and its inhabitants, the Whos, led by Mayor Ned McDodd, whose family includes his wife Sally, 96 daughters whose names all begin with the letter H, and one teenage son named JoJo. JoJo does not speak and, despite being next in line for the mayoral position, does not want to be the next mayor.

Once Horton begins carrying the speck with him, the city starts experiencing strange phenomena, and the Mayor finds his attempts to caution Whoville challenged by the Town Council, led by the opportunistic yet condescending Chairman. After he makes contact with Horton, the Mayor finds out from Dr. Mary Lou LaRue that Whoville will be destroyed if Horton does not find a "safer, more stable home". With the help of his best friend Morton the Mouse, Horton decides to place the speck atop Mt. Nool, the safest place in the jungle. The head of the jungle, the Sour Kangaroo, who refuses to believe that the Whos exist, demands numerous times that Horton give up the speck for overshadowing her authority, but Horton refuses. Also taking force toward Horton are the Wickersham Brothers, a group of monkeys who like to cause havoc around the jungle. Eventually, the Kangaroo enlists a sinister but idiotic vulture named Vlad Vladikoff to get rid of the speck by force. He initially only agrees to do it in exchange for the Kangaroo's son Rudy. But when she threatens to hire the Wickersham Brothers to do it, he eventually decides to do it for free.

After a few failed attempts, Vlad manages to steal the flower away from Horton and drops it into a massive field of identical pink flowers causing an apocalyptic tremor in Whoville. After unsuccessfully picking 2,999,999 flowers, Horton eventually recovers the flower and reveals himself to the rest of Whoville. The Kangaroo eventually finds out that Horton still has the speck, fires Vlad, and rallies the jungle community into arresting Horton, preying on their fears that their own children will become chaotic delinquents under his influence.

Upon cornering him, the Kangaroo offers Horton a final chance to renounce Whoville's existence. Horton refuses, and despite the heartfelt speech that he gives, the Kangaroo orders the animals to rope and cage him, and to have the speck and Whoville destroyed in a pot of beezlenut oil. The Mayor enlists all of his people to make noise so that all the animals will find out they are really there, assisted by JoJo's "Symphonophone", an invention which creates a huge musical contribution and reveals that JoJo's "true" passion is music, but still fails to penetrate the surface of the speck.

The Kangaroo snatches the flower from the captured Horton and prepares to drop it into the pot. Meanwhile, JoJo grabs the horn used to project Horton's voice, runs up the highest tower, and screams his first word, breaking through the sound barrier just seconds before Rudy grabs the flower close to the oil, as he, along with the Kangaroo and the other animals of Nool, hear the Whos shouting from the speck, and despite his mother's objections, Rudy returns the flower to the released Horton, while the animals, realizing the truth about the Whos' existence, turn on the Kangaroo for deceiving them.

While being praised for his integrity by his neighbors, Horton forgives the devastated and regretful Kangaroo, who befriends him with a makeshift umbrella for Whoville. The film ends with the Whos and the animals of Nool gathering to recite the chorus from "Can't Fight This Feeling" by REO Speedwagon, and it is revealed that the Jungle of Nool (and Earth as a whole) is just one speck, like Whoville, among numerous others, floating in space.

== Voice cast ==
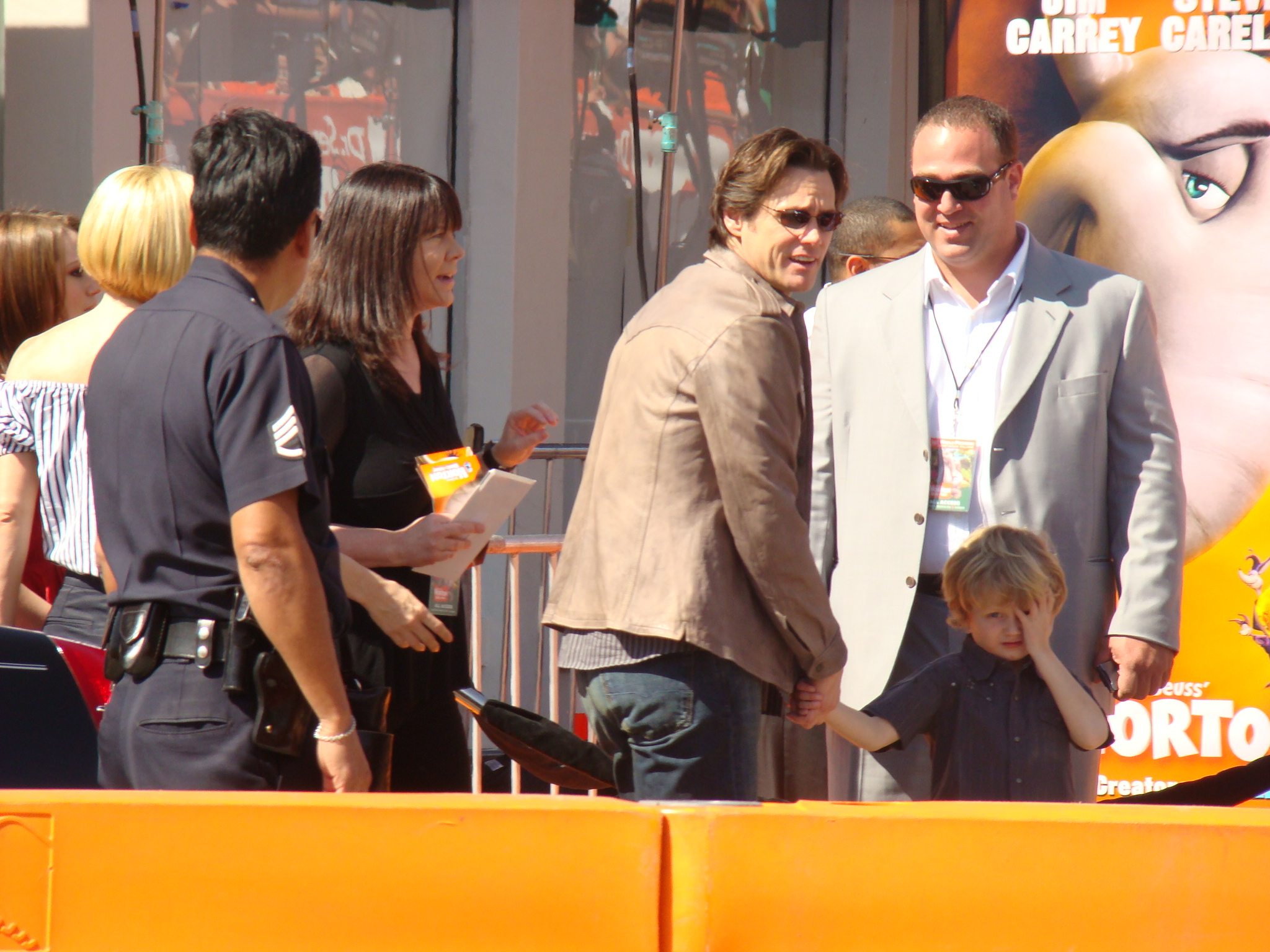
Jim Carrey and his family at the world premiere of the film in Westwood, Los Angeles

- Jim Carrey as Horton the Elephant, an eccentric, outgoing and good-hearted Elephant and teacher in the Jungle of Nool who possesses acute hearing abilities. Unlike regular elephants, he lacks tusks.
- Steve Carell as Mayor Ned McDodd, the high-strung eccentric fun-loving yet good-hearted mayor of Whoville who has 96 daughters, 1 son named JoJo, and a wife named Sally O'Malley.
- Carol Burnett as the Sour Kangaroo, an egomaniacal Kangaroo who mistrusts and sees Horton's inquisitive nature as a threat to her legal authority over Nool.
- Seth Rogen as Morton Mouse, a Mouse and Horton's best friend in the Jungle of Nool who does not believe his story, but still helps him.
- Amy Poehler as Sally O'Malley-McDodd, Mayor McDodd's wife and mother to Jojo and her 96 daughters.
- Jesse McCartney as JoJo McDodd, Mayor McDodd and Sally O'Malley's quiet (until the end) eldest son and the elder brother of his 96 sisters who does not want to be the next mayor of Whoville.
  - Fletcher Sheridan provides JoJo's singing voice in the film's final song.
- Josh Flitter as Rudy Kangaroo, the Sour Kangaroo's doubtful young son who is much kinder than his mother.
- Will Arnett as Vlad Vladikoff, a scary, savage, ravenous, and murderous yet egocentric, and foolish vulture-like monster with a slight Russian accent hired by the Sour Kangaroo to steal Horton's clover.
- Laura Ortiz as Jessica Quilligan, a chick of Red-Headed Palooski, Mrs. Quilligan's daughter, and one of Horton's students.
- Colleen O'Shaughnessey as Angela Glummox, a young female Glummox antelope, Mrs. Glummox's daughter and one of Horton's students.
- Jonah Hill as Thomas "Tommy" Cow-Bear, a fat bear cub with a cow-like snout and tiger-like stripes, Willie Cow-Bear's son and one of Horton's students.
- Joey King as Katie, a cute and eccentric yet odd yak calf and one of Horton's students.
- Dan Fogler as Vonford/the Chairman, the chairman of the Whoville government and the lead Whoville councilman, who is dedicated to traditions and mistrustful of Mayor McDodd.
  - Fogler also voices Yummo Wickersham, the largest and oldest of the Wickersham Brothers, who acts as their leader.
- Niecy Nash as Miss Yelp, Mayor McDodd's secretary.
- Isla Fisher as Dr. Mary Lou LaRue, a professor at Who U.
- Jaime Pressly as Mrs. Quilligan, Jessica's blue-headed mother.
- Laraine Newman as Mrs. Glummox, Angela's mother.
- Bill Farmer as Willie Cow-Bear, Tommy's father.
- Marshall Efron and Tim Nordquist as Nits and Nuts Wickersham and other Wickershams, Yummo's younger brothers and henchmen.
- Heather Goldenhersh as Who Girl
- Selena Gomez as Helga McDodd, one of the Mayor and Sally's daughters.
- Charles Osgood as the narrator

== Production ==
After the critical and commercial failure of the 2003 film The Cat in the Hat, Dr. Seuss's widow, Audrey Geisel, was so dissatisfied with the film that she then decided not to allow any more live-action feature films based on his work. In March 2005, as Blue Sky Studios was completing Robots, the studio and 20th Century Fox Animation president Chris Meledandri approached Geisel about getting the adaptation rights for Horton Hears a Who!. The art director for Robots, Steve Martino, along with story consultant and additional scene director Jimmy Hayward, created a model of protagonist Horton and some animation tests to showcase their design ideas to Geisel, who eventually agreed on "a seven-figure deal" for both the book and its predecessor Horton Hatches the Egg. Cinco Paul and Ken Daurio were then hired to write the script, to be directed by Hayward and Martino with a set release date of early 2008.

Geisel was credited as an executive producer and watched production up close, and also gave the directors full access to her late husband's archives, including his original sketches, 3-D sculptures, work done for the film The 5,000 Fingers of Dr. T. (1953), and even memos Dr. Seuss traded with Chuck Jones during the production of the Grinch TV special. For references in doing the character animation, along with footage of the voice actors performing their lines, the Blue Sky animators recorded themselves performing the script in an "acting room" to see what of their body language could translate well into the film. Geisel had personally requested that Jim Carrey voice Horton following his performance as the Grinch, which she liked despite initial doubt.

To make Horton different from the mammoths Blue Sky created for the Ice Age series, he would at times stand and walk upright and bipedally on two legs in a way that made him look like "a fat man in an elephant suit". The directors noticed Horton's design in the book varied according to his emotion, and the 3D wireframe tried to allow for the same effects, with a bigger mouth to allow for wider facial expressions like those of Jim Carrey.

== Soundtrack ==
Horton Hears a Who! (Original Motion Picture Soundtrack)

Film score by John Powell
- Released: March 25, 2008
- Recorded: 2007–2008
- Genre: Soundtrack
- Length: 59:56
- Label: Varèse Sarabande
- Producer: John Powell

The original score for the film's soundtrack album was composed by John Powell, conducted by Pete Anthony and performed by the Hollywood Studio Symphony. A soundtrack consisting of the film's score was released on March 25, 2008, by Varèse Sarabande. Near the end of the picture, the cast comes together and sings the song "Can't Fight This Feeling" by REO Speedwagon.

Other songs featured in the film include:

Title	Performer
"Can't Fight This Feeling"	Jim Carrey, Steve Carell, Amy Poehler, Carol Burnett, Dan Fogler, Seth Rogen, Will Arnett and Fletcher Sheridan
"Quickie"	Thomas Foyer
"Swingville Sashay"	Muff & Rezz
"Água Melão"	Gilberto Cândido
"The Blue Danube"	Johann Strauss II

== Reception ==
=== Critical reception ===
On Rotten Tomatoes, 79% of 135 reviews are positive, with an average rating of 7.3/10. The site's consensus reads, "Horton Hears A Who! is both whimsical and heartwarming, and is the rare Dr. Seuss adaptation that stays true to the spirit of the source material." On Metacritic, the film has a weighted average score of 71 out of 100 based on 31 reviews, indicating "generally favorable" reviews. Audiences polled by CinemaScore gave the film version an "A−" grade on an "A+" to "F" scale.

Kirk Honeycutt of The Hollywood Reporter called it "a delight, brimming with colorful, elastic characters and bountiful wit."

John Anderson of Variety wrote: "The real stars of the movie are the animators, who imbue even the overgrowth in Horton's jungle with a certain floppy Seuss-ishness."

=== Box office ===
Horton Hears a Who! grossed a total of $298.5 million on an $85 million budget. $154.5 million came from the United States and Canada, and $145 million from other territories.

In its opening weekend, the film grossed $45 million in 3,954 theaters, averaging $11,384 per theater in the United States and Canada, and ranking #1 at the box office. The film also had the strongest opening for a film starring Jim Carrey since Bruce Almighty, with the same applying to his costar in both films, Steve Carell.

The film previously had the fourth-largest opening weekend in March, behind Ice Age, Ice Age: The Meltdown and 300, and as of September 2012, it ranks 15th place. In the United States and Canada, Horton Hears a Who! was also the #1 film its second weekend of release, grossing $25 million over the Easter frame, in 3,961 theaters and averaging $6,208 per venue. It dropped to #2 in its third weekend grossing $17.8 million in 3,826 theaters and averaging $4,637 per venue. At the international box office it remained at #1 in its third week.

=== Interpretations ===
Horton Hears a Who!, like other Dr. Seuss creations, contains layered subtexts and messages. A major theme regards learning about universal values between vastly different places and people, as shown by the quote "A person's a person, no matter how small". This is employed on many levels: primarily with Horton and the Mayor of Whoville making contact and championing each other to the point where everyone around them eventually learns the truth about the speck that Whoville resides on; but also with the Mayor and Sour Kangaroo's relationships with their respective sons, Horton and the Mayor being challenged by Sour Kangaroo and the chairman, the fickle herd mentality of the jungle community (save Horton's students and Morton) and Horton still forgiving Sour Kangaroo, and the ending shot of all of the worlds being specks in space.

=== Accolades ===
Award	Date of ceremony	Category	Recipient(s)	Result	Ref.
Annie Awards	January 30, 2009	Outstanding Animated Effects	Alen Lai	Nominated	
Annie Awards	January 30, 2009	Outstanding Character Animation in a Feature Production	Jeff Gabor	Nominated	
Annie Awards	January 30, 2009	Outstanding Character Design in an Animated Feature Production	Sang Jun Lee	Nominated	
Annie Awards	January 30, 2009	Outstanding Music in an Animated Feature Production	John Powell	Nominated	
Annie Awards	January 30, 2009	Outstanding Writing in an Animated Feature Production	Cinco Paul and Ken Daurio	Nominated	
ASCAP Film and Television Music Awards	May 12, 2009	Top Box Office Films	John Powell for Bolt, Hancock, Horton Hears a Who! and Jumper	Won	
Golden Reel Award	February 21, 2009	Best Sound Editing - Sound Effects, Foley, Music, Dialogue and ADR Animation in a Feature Film	Randy Thom, Dennis Leonard, Jonathan Null, Sue Fox, Thomas A. Carlson, Steve Slanec, Colette D. Dahanne, Pete Horner, Kyrsten Mate, Mac Smith, Jeremy Bowker, Andrea Gard, Ronni Brown, Ellen Heuer, Dennie Thorpe, Jana Vance	Nominated	
Golden Trailer Awards	May 8, 2008	Best Animation/Family TV Spot for "Whomongous"	Horton Hears a Who!	Nominated	
Houston Film Critics Society	December 17, 2008	Best Animated Feature Film	Horton Hears a Who!	Nominated	
IFMCA Awards	February 18, 2009	Best Original Score for an Animated Feature Film	John Powell	Nominated	
Nickelodeon Kids' Choice Awards	March 28, 2009	Favorite Voice From an Animated Movie	Jim Carrey	Nominated	
Online Film Critics Society	January 19, 2009	Best Animated Feature	Horton Hears a Who!	Nominated	
Satellite Awards	December 14, 2008	Best Motion Picture, Animated or Mixed Media	Horton Hears a Who!	Nominated	
Satellite Awards	December 14, 2008	Best Original Score	John Powell	Nominated	
Saturn Awards	June 25, 2009	Best Animated Film	Horton Hears a Who!	Nominated	
Young Artist Awards	March 29, 2009	Best Performance in a Voice-Over Role - Young Actress	Selena Gomez	Nominated	
Young Artist Awards	March 29, 2009	Best Performance in a Voice-Over Role - Young Actress	Shelby Adamowsky	Nominated	
Young Artist Awards	March 29, 2009	Best Performance in a Voice-Over Role - Young Actress	Joey King	Nominated	

== Home media ==
Dr. Seuss' Horton Hears a Who! was released on DVD and Blu-ray on December 9, 2008. Three versions of the DVD are available: a single-disc edition, a 2-disc special edition, and a gift set packaged with a Horton plush. All three versions included the Ice Age short film Surviving Sid.

In the United States, the film earned $77,630,768 from DVD sales and $180,434 from Blu-ray sales for a total of $77,811,202 in video sales.
