= Anthony Asbury =

American actor and puppeteer

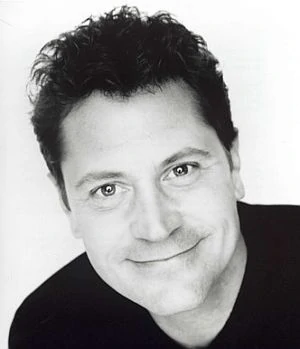
- Born: Arlington, Texas, U.S.
- Occupations: Actor; puppeteer
- Years active: 1981–present

Anthony Asbury is an American actor and puppeteer. He has been working as a puppeteer for over three decades.

== Career ==
Asbury, a native of Arlington, Texas, began his career as a puppeteer on the ITV satire show Spitting Image, where he performed a majority of characters between 1984 and 1992, these included voicing several of the characters including Pope John Paul II, John McEnroe, and Edwin Meese, together with Steve Nallon he was the puppeteer for Margaret Thatcher from the second season. It was on Spitting Image that he met Louise Gold, who introduced Asbury to Jim Henson, who at the time was currently in the proceeds of production for Labyrinth. Henson invited Asbury to perform some of the creatures for the film, he was the puppeteer for Firey 5, One of the Four Guards, Right Door Knocker. He later remained associated with the Henson company, performing puppets for other film and television roles these included The Witches, The Flintstones, and The Wubbulous World of Dr. Seuss.

Asbury's other roles include Little Shop of Horrors and Absolutely Fabulous.

== Filmography ==
- Spitting Image (1984–1992)
- Round the Bend (1989–1991)
- Labyrinth (1986)
- Little Shop of Horrors (1986)
- The Witches (1990)
- Absolutely Fabulous (episode Fat 1992)
- The Flintstones (1994)
- Allegra's Window (1994-1996) Rondo, Poco
- The Wubbulous World of Dr. Seuss - Thidwick the Big-Hearted Moose, Yertle the Turtle, The Grinch, Terrence McBird, Additional Muppets
- Harry's Mad (1993)
- Between the Lions - Lionel Lion
- Noddy (1998)
