= Horton Hatches the Egg =

1940 children's book by Dr. Seuss

- Cover to Horton Hatches the Egg
- Author: Dr. Seuss
- Illustrator: Dr. Seuss
- Cover artist: Dr. Seuss
- Language: English
- Genre: Picture book, children's literature
- Publisher: Random House
- Publication date: June 19, 1940 (renewed 1968)
- Publication place: United States
- Media type: Print
- Pages: 64 pages
- OCLC: 189245
- Preceded by: The Seven Lady Godivas
- Followed by: McElligot's Pool; Horton Hears a Who! (plotwise)

Horton Hatches the Egg is a children's book written and illustrated by Theodor Geisel under the pen name Dr. Seuss and published in 1940 by Random House. The book tells the story of Horton the Elephant, who is tricked into sitting on a bird's egg while its mother, Mayzie, takes a permanent vacation to Palm Beach. Horton endures a number of hardships but persists, often stating, "I meant what I said, and I said what I meant. An elephant's faithful, one hundred percent!" Ultimately, the egg hatches, revealing an elephant-bird, a creature with a blend of Mayzie's and Horton's features.

According to Geisel's biographers Judith and Neil Morgan, Geisel claimed the story was born in early 1940 when he left a window open in his studio, and the wind fortuitously blew a sketch of an elephant on top of a sketch of a tree. However, according to later biographer Charles Cohen, this account is probably apocryphal. He found elements of Horton in earlier Dr. Seuss works, most notably the 1938 short story "Matilda, the Elephant with a Mother Complex".

Horton Hatches the Egg was published to immediate critical acclaim and financial success and has remained popular with the general public. The book has also been used as the basis for academic articles on a variety of topics, including economics, Christianity, feminism, and adoption. Horton appeared again in the 1954 Dr. Seuss book Horton Hears a Who! These two books later provided the thrust of the plot for the 2000 Broadway musical Seussical.

== Plot ==
The book centers on a genial elephant named Horton, who is convinced by Mayzie, an irresponsible and lazy bird, to sit on her egg while she takes a short "break", which turns into a permanent relocation to Palm Beach.

As Horton sits in the nest on top of a tree, he is exposed to the elements, laughed at by his jungle friends, captured by hunters, forced to endure a terrible sea voyage, and finally placed in a traveling circus. However, despite his hardships and Mayzie's clear intent not to return, Horton refuses to leave the nest because he insists on keeping his word, often repeating, "I meant what I said, and I said what I meant. An elephant's faithful, one hundred percent!"

The traveling circus ends up visiting near Mayzie's new Palm Beach residence. She visits the circus just as the egg is due to hatch (after 51 weeks in Palm Beach) and demands that Horton should return it, without offering him a reward. However, when the egg hatches, the creature that emerges is an "elephant-bird", a cross between Horton and Mayzie, and Horton and the baby are returned happily to the jungle, while Mayzie is punished for her laziness by ending up with nothing.

== Background ==
According to Geisel's biographers Judith and Neil Morgan, Horton Hatches the Egg was born in 1940, the day after New Year's, when he took a break from drawing in his Park Avenue apartment and went for a walk. When he returned, he noticed that he had left a window open in his studio and that the wind had blown one sketch on transparent paper on top of another, making it look like an elephant was sitting in a tree. This account was based on interviews with Geisel, who had told similar stories about the book's creation to reporters asking about his creative process since as early as 1957. The story had changed with each telling but always involved the fortuitous juxtaposition of drawings of an elephant and a tree.

Charles Cohen, on the other hand, found traces of Horton Hatches the Egg in early Dr. Seuss works. In an early installment of Geisel's cartoon feature "Boids and the Beasties", which began in Judge magazine in 1927, he juxtaposed a bird and an elephant. A few weeks later, he drew a story in which a whale ends up passed out in a catalpa tree.

In 1938, two years before Horton Hatches the Egg, Judge published perhaps the most obvious precursor to Horton, "Matilda, the Elephant with a Mother Complex", a short story by Geisel about an "old maid elephant" who sits on a chickadee egg until it hatches, only to have the newborn chickadee fly away from her. In 1939, Geisel created an advertisement for NBC featuring a sympathetic-looking elephant lashed with ropes and contained in a cage made of sticks, similar to Horton's situation when the hunters capture him in Horton Hatches the Egg.

In early drafts, the elephant's name changed from Osmer to Bosco to Humphrey. The final choice, Horton, was apparently after Horton Conrad, one of Geisel's classmates at Dartmouth College. The bird's name changed from Bessie to Saidie and finally Mayzie. In the first draft, the elephant character volunteered to sit on the eggs for the bird, who was very reluctant.

== Publication and reception ==
Horton Hatches the Egg was published by Random House in fall 1940 to immediate success. It received primarily positive notice from critics. Kirkus Reviews called it "sheer nonsense, but good fun." The reviewer for The New York Times Book Review wrote, "A moral is a new thing to find in a Dr. Seuss book, but it doesn't much interfere with the hilarity with which he juggles an elephant up a tree. To an adult, the tale seems a little forced compared to his first grand yarns, less inevitable in its nonsense, but neither young nor old are going to quibble with the fantastic comedy of his pictures."

The book also found early success with book buyers and the general public. It sold 6,000 copies in its first year and 1,600 in its second. Frances Chrystie, the juvenile buyer for FAO Schwarz, wrote to Bennett Cerf, Geisel's publisher, "I've been sitting alone in my apartment reading Horton aloud to myself over and over again... It's the funniest book I've ever seen... [Our] merchandise manager thinks he can find an elephant in the store, and we can make a tree and lay an egg and have a very fine window for Book Week." Mary Stix of James Book Store in Cincinnati, Ohio, noted the book's popularity with adults as well as children. Numerous booksellers invited Geisel to hold autographing events at their stores, and Cerf sent him on a tour across several U.S. cities to promote the book. However, the book was less well received in England, where it was rejected by seven publishers before Hamish Hamilton finally published it, to modest success, in 1947. This mirrored a general trend, as Dr. Seuss books were slow to catch on in England.

Horton Hatches the Egg has remained popular in the United States. In 2001, Publishers Weekly reported that the book had sold 987,996 to that point, placing it at 138 in the magazine's list of the best-selling children's books of all time. It was included in Six by Seuss: A Treasury of Dr. Seuss Classics, which was the main selection for the Book-of-the-Month Club in June 1991. In 1992, less than a year after Geisel's death, Horton's refrain was included in the 16th edition of Bartlett's Familiar Quotations. In 2007, the National Education Association listed the book as one of its "Teachers' Top 100 Books for Children", based on an online poll.

== Analysis ==
Horton Hatches the Egg has been used in discussions on a wide variety of topics, including economics, Christianity, feminism, and adoption.

Alison Lurie, in a 1990 article about Dr. Seuss from a feminist perspective, criticized Horton Hatches the Egg as a statement for fetal rights (opposed by Lurie) and for its negative treatment of Mayzie. Lurie claimed an almost complete lack of strong female protagonists in Dr. Seuss books and further asserted that Mayzie, who is obviously an antagonist and is depicted as lazy and irresponsible, is "the most memorable female character in [Dr Seuss's] entire oeuvre". Geisel responded to Lurie's criticism, by way of his biographers near the end of his life, by remarking that most of his characters are animals, noting, "if she can identify their sex, I'll remember her in my will."

Jill Deans, in a 2000 article, used the book in a discussion of adoption, surrogacy, and particularly, embryo donation. She noted that it is "a classic tale of surrogacy" and that it "evokes the intricacies of the nature/nurture debate". She contends that the book celebrates adoptive parents and caregivers, in the form of Horton, but vilifies birth mothers, in the form of Mayzie. Both Deans and Philip Nel point to the book's real-life implications for Geisel and his wife. Deans draws a connection between the elephant-bird in Horton and the Infantograph, a failed invention Geisel created that combined two photos and was meant to give couples an idea of what their children would look like. Nel, meanwhile, connected the book to the short story "Matilda the Elephant". Noting that the Geisels could not have children, Nel argued that "Matilda", and by extension Horton, may have been manifestations of the Geisels' longing for children.

In 2004, James W. Kemp, a retired United Methodist pastor, compared Horton to the early Christians to whom the First Epistle of Peter was addressed. Like those early Christians, Horton faces persecution and ridicule for his actions, but Horton is faithful to his mission and is rewarded, as evidenced by the elephant-bird that hatches at the end of the book.

Richard B. Freeman, writing in 2011 about the contemporaneous economic situation in the United States, called Horton Hatches the Egg a tale of investment. Freeman argued that "economic growth requires long-term investments", as embodied by Horton's sitting on the egg, and that "trust is important in a well-functioning economy", as embodied by Horton's repeated maxim, "I meant what I said, and I said what I meant."

== Adaptations ==
The book was adapted into a ten-minute animated short film by Leon Schlesinger Productions and released in 1942 as part of Warner Bros.' Merrie Melodies series. The short was directed by Bob Clampett and marked the first time a Dr. Seuss work was adapted for the screen and also the only time a WB animated short was licensed to be based on pre-existing work still under copyright.

In 1966, Soyuzmultfilm released an 18-minute Russian film adaptation called I Am Waiting for a Nestling. It was directed by Nikolai Serebryakov and won the Silver Medal for Best Children's Film at Tours in 1967.

In 1992, Random House released "Horton Hatches the Egg" in its series of Dr. Seuss videos, narrated by Billy Crystal and directed by Mark Reeder. "If I Ran the Circus" is second in the double feature video.

The book itself was read in a 1994 episode of Kino's Storytime as told by Gordon Jump.

Horton appeared again in Horton Hears a Who, published in 1954. The plot of the 2000 Broadway musical Seussical, a retelling of a number of Dr. Seuss books, borrows heavily from both Horton books.

Although never adapted into a feature film, the 2008 film adaptation of Horton Hears a Who! references the book, with Horton quoting his most famous line, "I meant what I said, and I said what I meant. An elephant's faithful one hundred percent." While making the 2008 film, Blue Sky Studios and 20th Century Fox briefly got the film rights to Horton Hatches the Egg as a proposed sequel to their adaptation.

== See also ==
- Horton Principle – a design rule in cryptography named after the book
