= Horton Hears a Who! (TV special) =

1970 Dr. Seuss television special

- Genre: Adventure
- Created by: Dr. Seuss
- Based on: Horton Hears a Who! by Dr. Seuss
- Written by: Dr. Seuss
- Directed by: Chuck Jones; Ben Washam
- Voices of: Hans Conried; Chuck Jones; June Foray
- Narrated by: Hans Conried
- Music by: Eugene Poddany
- Country of origin: United States
- Original language: English

Production
- Executive producer: Audrey Geisel
- Producers: Chuck Jones; Dr. Seuss
- Editor: Jim Faris
- Running time: 26 minutes
- Production companies: The Cat in the Hat Productions; MGM Animation/Visual Arts

Original release
- Network: CBS
- Release: March 19, 1970

Horton Hears a Who! is a 1970 American animated television special based on the 1954 Dr. Seuss book of the same name, Horton Hears a Who! The special was produced and directed by Chuck Jones who previously produced the Seuss special How the Grinch Stole Christmas! for MGM Television and first broadcast March 19, 1970 on CBS. The special contains songs with lyrics by Seuss and music by Eugene Poddany, who previously wrote songs for Seuss' book, The Cat in the Hat Song Book.

== Plot ==
In the Jungle of Nool, Horton the Elephant bathes in the watering hole, when he sees a small dust speck floating by. He hears a call for help coming from the dust speck and, thinking someone is living on it, saves it from going over a waterfall. Setting it on top of a clover, he discovers it is home to a very tiny town called Whoville, home to the microscopic Whos. One of the Whos, scientist Dr. H. Hoovey (replacing the Mayor), communicates with Horton through a device he built to see other worlds outside of the speck. The other Whos, however, are confused by Dr. Hoovey's intelligence, and do not share his views. Horton promises to protect Whoville from harm, feeling that "a person's a person, no matter how small". The other animals in the jungle — particularly the cynical Jane Kangaroo — think he is crazy, and do not believe in the existence of the Whos (mainly due to believing that anything which cannot be seen or heard is nonexistent).

Thinking Horton's behavior is a problem, Jane sends the Wickersham Brothers to take the clover with the speck from him. They give the clover to the “black-bottomed” eagle Whizzer McWoff, who flies away with it. Horton pursues McWoff across the mountains below, but the eagle drops the clover into a large field of clovers and leaves Horton to find it. Horton searches frantically through the field, eventually finding his clover, and learns from Dr. Hoovey that Whoville was badly damaged when the clover was dropped. The other Whos, seeing the destruction as proof that Dr. Hoovey was right, rally behind him.

Jane finds Horton with the clover and, with help from the Wickersham Brothers (and their relatives), plans to end Horton's "problem" once and for all. They tie Horton up and pull him into a cage, intending to boil the dust speck in beezle-nut oil. Horton urges the Whos to make noise to prove their existence, but even with the Whos' shouting and loud instruments, the other animals still hear nothing. Dr. Hoovey searches through town and finds a small Who named JoJo, who is bouncing a yo-yo instead of making noise. He takes JoJo to the top of his tower, where JoJo utters a "Yopp", which breaks through the dust speck and allows the animals to finally hear the Whos; they release Horton and allow him to keep it. The special ends with Dr. Hoovey relaxing in his chair when he sees a small dust speck and hears a call for help coming from it, much to his dismay.

== Voice cast ==
- Hans Conried as Horton the Elephant / Narrator / Dr. H. Hoovey
- Chuck Jones as Junior Kangaroo / Vlad Vladikoff (renamed "Whizzer McKwoff") / JoJo
- June Foray as Jane Kangaroo / Birds / Mother Who / Baby Who
- The Mellomen as the Wickersham Brothers
- The MGM Chorus as the Citizens of Whoville

== Songs ==
1. "Mrs. Toucanella Told Me" - June Foray
2. "Old Doc Hoovey" - MGM Studio Chorus
3. "The Wickersham Brothers" - The Mellomen
4. "Doctor Hoovey, You Were Right" - MGM Studio Chorus
5. "Horton the Elephant's Going to Be Caged" - June Foray and The Mellomen
6. "We Are Here!" - Hans Conried and MGM Studio Chorus
7. "Be Kind to Your Small Person Friends" (to the tune of Stars and Stripes Forever) - MGM Studio Chorus

== Development ==
Horton Hears a Who! had already been planned as the second animated Dr. Seuss television special before How the Grinch Stole Christmas! had debuted, with the decision to greenlight the Horton special dependent upon if Grinch, which had required an unusually high budget, was a success (which it was).

== Awards ==
Horton Hears a Who! was cited in the 1970 Peabody Award to the Dr. Seuss programs.

== Home media ==
The special was frequently included on VHS, CED, LaserDisc and DVD releases of How the Grinch Stole Christmas!, and was released on its own DVD on March 4, 2008. Bonus features include a songs-only version, the cartoons Horton Hatches the Egg, The Butter Battle Book, and Daisy-Head Mayzie, and the 1994 documentary In Search of Dr. Seuss. It was also made available in high definition Blu-ray Disc on October 6, 2009 with all the bonus features except Horton Hatches the Egg, a DVD of the special, and a Digital Copy.
