= Horton and the Kwuggerbug and More Lost Stories =

Book by Dr. Seuss

- Author: Dr. Seuss
- Illustrator: Dr. Seuss
- Language: English
- Publisher: Redbook (magazines); Random House (book)
- Publication date: 1950 ("Marco Comes Late" and "How Officer Pat Saved the Whole Town"); 1951 ("Horton and the Kwuggerbug"); 1955 ("The Hoobub and the Grinch"); 2014
- Publication place: United States
- Media type: Print
- Pages: 53
- ISBN: 978-0375973420 (first edition, hardcover)
- OCLC: 866615089
- LC Class: PZ8.3.S477 Hoq 2014
- Preceded by: The Bippolo Seed and Other Lost Stories
- Followed by: What Pet Should I Get?

Horton and the Kwuggerbug and More Lost Stories is an anthology of children's stories written and illustrated by Dr. Seuss, published posthumously by Random House in 2014.

== Background ==
The four stories in this book were originally published as installments of a monthly column that Dr. Seuss wrote for Redbook during the 1950s. Dr. Seuss died in 1991, but the stories were later rediscovered by Seuss scholar Charles D. Cohen.

== Plots ==
The four stories included in the book are as follows:

- "Horton and the Kwuggerbug": A Kwuggerbug lands on Horton the Elephant's trunk and asks him to take him to his beezlenut tree, which Horton agrees to since when they get there the bug promises that Horton will get half the nuts. The journey to the beezlenut tree is quite hazardous, and Horton falls upon such hardships as swimming across a large crocodile infested river and climbing a large and rocky mountain, while the Kwuggerbug takes advantage of Horton's good nature. In the end, the Kwuggerbug tries to double-cross Horton, but a well-timed sneeze makes things more even.
- "Marco Comes Late": Marco from And to Think That I Saw It on Mulberry Street explains to his teacher, Miss Block, why he was late for school. His explanation involves a bird who landed on his books and laid an egg there, and various animals who argue over whether he should protect the egg or get to school on time. In the end, the teacher (understandably) sees through the tall tale for the morsel of truth.
- "How Officer Pat Saved the Whole Town": Officer Pat sees a gnat about to disturb a cat and realizes this could be the start of a string of disasters that could obliterate the town. He intervenes and the town is saved.
- "The Hoobub and the Grinch": A very short story in which a con-artist (named the Grinch, but having virtually no resemblance to the curmudgeon later featured in How the Grinch Stole Christmas!) convinces a Hoobub that a piece of green string is better than the sun.

== Reception ==
Michael Taube of The Washington Times was enthusiastic about the book: "If you loved Dr. Seuss as a child (and as an adult), these little-known stories will bring back many fond memories". The reviewer for Publishers Weekly was more critical: "By no means gems, these archives suggest how Geisel tinkered with characters, developed his signature tetrameter, and commented on ethical issues, circa 1950".
