= Mercer Mayer bibliography =

This is a list of the works of American children's author and illustrator Mercer Mayer.

The following is a partial list of books that Mercer Mayer has written and/or illustrated. It also includes books and items that are related to Mercer Mayer and his creations (such as coloring books, sticker books, lacing cards and toys).

== Little Critter related books ==
Just for You front cover

Little Critter is an anthropomorphic character created by Mercer Mayer. Although it's not specified what species the Little Critter is, he resembles a woodchuck or guinea pig. Little Critter first appeared in the 1975 book Just for You. This book is sometimes mistitled Just for Yu because of the childlike mistake on the front cover.

The following books feature Little Critter.

=== Little Critter main series ===
Published in the Golden Books "Look-Look Books" series
Individual books may also be available in special editions

- Just For You (1975) (Embedded 1987 version in 1987) (Embedded 1989 version in 1989) The original hardcover version had pages like, "I wanted to build a beautiful treehouse just for you. But I hurt myself".
- Just Me and My Dad (1977) (Embedded 1992 version in 1992)
- The New Baby (1980) (Embedded 1983 version in 1983)
- All by Myself (1983) (Embedded 2000 version in 2000)
- I Was So Mad (1983) (Embedded 2009 version in August 5, 2009)
- Just Go To Bed (1983)
- Just Grandma and Me (1983)
- Just Grandpa and Me (1983)
- Me Too! (1983)
- Merry Christmas Mom and Dad (1983)
- When I Get Bigger (1985) (also released as a mini-hardback book)
- Just Me and My Puppy (1985) (Embedded 1992 version in 1992)
- Just Me and My Babysitter (1986)
- Just Me and My Little Sister (1986)
- Just a Mess (1987)
- Baby Sister Says No (1987) (Embedded 2015 version in September 1, 2015)
- Happy Easter, Little Critter (1988) ISBN 0-307-11723-5
- I Just Forgot (1988)
- Just My Friend and Me (1988)
- Just a Daydream (1989)
- Just Shopping with Mom (1989) In the original version (1989 version), Little Critter's mom threatened Little Sister with a spanking/beating. (That is, when Little Sister wanted to buy candy but could not have it.) In reprints (since the mid 1990's), she threatened Little Sister with a time-out. (That is, since reprints – as of the mid 1990s – replaced spanking/beating references with "time out".) The spanking/beating line was changed to, "Would you like a time out instead?".
- Just Me and My Mom (1990) The original 1990 version depicted Little Critter in the Native American exhibit wearing a Native American chief costume with the headdress and his mother and Museum guard get mad at him. This image has since been removed in the 2014 reprints.
- Just Going to the Dentist (1990)
- Just Me and My Little Brother (1991)
- Little Critter at Scout Camp (1991)
- What a Bad Dream (1992) ISBN 0-307-12685-4
- Just Me and My Cousin (1992; with Gina Mayer) ISBN 0-307-12688-9
- This is My Family (1992; with Gina Mayer) ISBN 0-307-00137-7
- Little Critter's Joke Book (1993)
- Trick or Treat, Little Critter (1993; with Gina Mayer)
- A Very Special Critter (1993; with Gina Mayer)
- Just Me in the Tub (1994; with Gina Mayer)
- Just Lost! (1994; with Gina Mayer) ISBN 0-307-12844-X
- I'm Sorry (1995; with Gina Mayer) ISBN 0895777819
- Just a Bully (1999; with Gina Mayer) ISBN 0-307-13200-5
- Just a New Neighbor (1999; with Gina Mayer) ISBN 0-307-13265-X
- Just a Toy (2000; with Gina Mayer) ISBN 0-307-13279-X
- Just a Piggy Bank (2001; with Gina Mayer) ISBN 0-307-13283-8
- Just a Secret (2001; with Gina Mayer) ISBN 0-307-13287-0
- Just a Snowy Vacation (2001; with Gina Mayer)
- Just Not Invited (2002; with Gina Mayer) ISBN 0-307-13289-7
- Just a Baseball Game (2003; with Gina Mayer) ISBN 0-307-10451-6
- Just Fishing with Grandma (2003; with Gina Mayer) ISBN 0-307-10453-2
- Just a Little Homework (2004; with Gina Mayer) ISBN 0-375-82745-5

=== The new adventures ===
Continuation of the main series with HarperFestival
same dimensions, may contain some stickers, or other items.

- Bye-Bye, Mom and Dad (2004; with Gina Mayer) ISBN 0-06-053945-3 (with pull-out poster Family Tree)
- Good for Me and You (2004; with Gina Mayer) ISBN 0-06-053948-8 (with more than 20 stickers)
- Happy Halloween, Little Critter! (2004) ISBN 0-06-053971-2 (with pull back flaps)
- Just a School Project (2004; with Gina Mayer) ISBN 0-06-053946-1 (with more than 20 stickers)
- Just a Snowman (2004; with Gina Mayer) ISBN 0-06-053947-X (with more than 20 stickers)
- Just Big Enough (2004; with Gina Mayer) ISBN 0-06-053963-1 (with Pull out growth chart) (this book can be found as an oversized hardback)
- Merry Christmas, Little Critter (2004; with Gina Mayer) ISBN 0-06-053972-0 (with pull back flaps)
- My Trip to the Hospital (2005; with Gina Mayer) ISBN 0-06-053949-6 (with 5 adhesive bandages that feature Little Critter)
- Happy Valentine's Day, Little Critter (2005; with Gina Mayer) ISBN 0-06-053973-9 (with pull back flaps)
- Just so Thankful (2006; with Gina Mayer) ISBN 0-06-053950-X (with four thank you cards)
- It's Easter, Little Critter! (2007; with Gina Mayer) ISBN 0-06-053974-7 (with pull back flaps)
- Grandma, Grandpa, and Me (2007; with Gina Mayer) ISBN 0-06-053951-8
- Happy Father's Day! (2007; with Gina Mayer) ISBN 0-06-053965-8
- The Lost Dinosaur Bone (December 2007) ISBN 0-06-053952-6
- Snowball Soup (an I Can Read book) (September 2007) ISBN 0-06-083544-3 (hardcover) and ISBN 0-06-083543-5 (paperback)
- It's Earth Day (February 2008) ISBN 0-06-053959-3 (originally announced under the title My Earth Day Surprise)
- The Best Teacher Ever (May 2008) ISBN 0-06-053960-7
- Going to the Firehouse (an I Can Read book) (June 2008) ISBN 0-06-083546-X (hardcover) ISBN 0-06-083545-1 (paperback)
- Just a Day at the Pond (July 2008) ISBN 0-06-053961-5
- To the Rescue! (an I Can Read book) (September 2008) ISBN 0-06-083548-6 (hardcover) ISBN 0-06-083547-8 (paperback)
- This Is My Town (an I Can Read book) (December 2008) ISBN 0-06-083550-8 (hardcover) ISBN 0-06-083549-4 (paperback)
- Happy Mother's Day! (March 2008) ISBN 0-06-053970-4
- First Day of School (June 2009) ISBN 0-06-053969-0
- The Fall Festival (an I Can Read book) (July 2009) ISBN 0-06-083551-6
- Going to the Sea Park (an I Can Read book) (September 2009) ISBN 0-06-083553-2
- Just a Little Music (December 2009) ISBN 0-06-053962-3
- Just a Little Sick (December 2009) ISBN 0-06-083555-9
- Just Saving My Money (an I Can Read book) (June 2010) ISBN 0-06-083557-5
- The Best Yard Sale (July 2010) ISBN 0-06-147799-0
- Just Critters Who Care (an I Can Read book) (August 2010) ISBN 0-06-083559-1
- Just a Little Luck (February 2011) ISBN 0-06-147800-8
- A Green, Green Garden (an I Can Read book) (March 2011) ISBN 0-06-083561-3
- Just Helping My Dad (an I Can Read book) (April, 2011) ISBN 0-06-083563-X
- The Best Show and Share (June, 2011) ISBN 0-06-147801-6
- Just a Little Too Little (February, 2012) ISBN 0-06-147802-4
- What a Good Kitty (May 2012) ISBN 0-06-083565-6
- We Are Moving (October, 2012) ISBN 0-06-147803-2
- Just a Big Storm (March, 2013) ISBN 0-06-147804-0
- Just One More Pet (May, 2013) ISBN 0-06-147807-5
- Just Big Enough (June 4, 2013)
- It's True (Inspired Kids series – publisher Thomas Nelson) (Oct 8, 2013)
- You Go First (Inspired Kids series – publisher Thomas Nelson) (Oct 8, 2013)
- Just a Little Love (an I Can Read book) (November 26, 2013) ISBN 0061478156
- Just a Kite (an I Can Read book) (March 4, 2014) ISBN 0061478148
- Just My Lost Treasure (May 27, 2014) ISBN 0061478067
- Being Thankful (Inspired Kids series – publisher Thomas Nelson) (July 29, 2014) ISBN 1400322499
- We All Need Forgiveness (Inspired Kids series – publisher Thomas Nelson) (Jul 29, 2014) ISBN 1400322510
- Just a Special Day (an I Can Read book) (October 14, 2014) ISBN 0061478172
- Just Fishing with Grandma by Mercer Mayer and Gina Mayer (March 10, 2015) ISBN 0061478083

=== Scholastic series ===
Portrait shaped in different sizes

- I'm Sorry (1995; with Gina Mayer)
- At the Beach With Dad (1998; with Gina Mayer)
- It's Mine (2000; with Gina Mayer)

=== Special publications ===
- Just a Snowy Day (1983) "Golden Touch and Feel Book" ISBN 0-307-12156-9 (republished by HarperCollins)
- Little Critter In Search of the Beautiful Princess (1993) Green Frog Publishers ISBN 1-56619-449-0 (oversized hardcover book in the style of the Where's Waldo series)
- Little Critter's Camp Out: A Golden Sound Story (1994) ISBN 0-307-70902-7
- Little Critter: Just a Pirate (a "Magic Touch Talking Book" by Hasbro, Incorporated) (July 1996) ISBN 1-888208-12-0
- Little Critter: Just Going to the Moon (a "Magic Touch Talking Book" by Hasbro, Incorporated (July 1996) ISBN 1-888208-11-2
- Super Critter To The Rescue: A Golden Sound Story (1997) ISBN 0-307-74708-5
- Just a Bubble Bath (1997) Inchworm Press, "Scrub-A-Dub Bath Book" (10 pages) ISBN 1-57719-222-2
- Just My Camera and Me: Photo Fun Package (1998) Inchworm Press, ISBN 1-57719-398-9 (comes with a camera, a photo album, and the book Just My Camera and Me)
- Just a Garden (1999) ISBN 1-57719-605-8 (was sold as a kit with four small plastic gardening tools and the book Just a Garden)

=== Little Golden Books ===
A numbered series. These were re-released by Scholastic and as a part of Mercer Mayer's Little Critter Book Club

- Just a Bad Day (1993; with Gina Mayer) ISBN 0-307-98873-2
- Taking Care of Mom (1993; with Gina Mayer) ISBN 0-307-98880-5
- Just a Little Different (1993; with Gina Mayer) ISBN 0-307-98875-9
- Just Like Dad (1993; with Gina Mayer) ISBN 0-307-98876-7
- Just Say Please (1993; with Gina Mayer) ISBN 0-307-96017-X
- This is My Body (1993; with Gina Mayer) ISBN 0-307-96013-7
- I'm Sorry (1993; with Gina Mayer)
- Just A Gum Wrapper (1993; by Gina and Mercer Mayer) ISBN 0-89577-766-5
- Just Me and My Bicycle (1993; by Gina and Mercer Mayer)
- Just Too Little (1993; by Gina and Mercer Mayer)
- Just Leave Me Alone (1995; with Gina Mayer) ISBN 0-307-96016-1
- The School Play (1995; by Gina and Mercer Mayer)
- The Loose Tooth (1995; by Gina and Mercer Mayer)
- Just an Airplane (1995; by Gina and Mercer Mayer) ISBN 0-89577-784-3
- I Was So Sick (1995; with Gina Mayer)

=== Little Sister (of Little Critter) ===
Published as Golden Books "Little Look-Look Books"

- Little Sister's Birthday (1988)
- Just a Nap (1989) (Since The Mid-1990's)
- Just a Rainy Day (1990)
- When I Grow Up (1991)
- Just Camping Out (1991)
- The New Potty (1992; with Gina Mayer)
- Just a Thunderstorm (1993; with Gina Mayer) ISBN 0-375-82633-5
- My Big Sister (1995; with Gina Mayer)
- The Magic Pumpkin (1997; with Gina Mayer)

=== Little Critter Storybooks featuring the "Critter Kids" ===
These were initially published by Scholastic publishing as accordion-style fold-out board books.
Most were republished by Random House and Green Frog as regular hardcover and softcover books.

- Malcom's Race (1983) ISBN 0-590-32808-5
- Possum Child Goes Shopping (1983) ISBN 0-590-32806-9
- Little Sister's Bracelet (originally titled Too's Bracelet) (1983) ISBN 0-590-32810-7, ISBN 0-88029-800-6, ISBN 0-517-27369-1
- Bun Bun's Birthday (originally titled SweetMeat's Birthday) (1983) ISBN 0-590-32809-3, ISBN 0-517-27160-5, ISBN 0-679-87368-6
- Bat Child's Haunted House (1983) ISBN 0-590-32811-5, ISBN 0-88029-802-2
- Gator Cleans House (1983) ISBN 0-590-32807-7, ISBN 0-517-60092-7, ISBN 0-679-87354-6

=== Readers ===
Published by Random House, McGraw-Hill Children's Publishing, and by School Specialty Publishing

- Little Critter Sleeps Over (Road To Reading adaption of Little Critter's Staying Overnight from 1988) (1999) ISBN 0-307-26203-0
- My Trip to the Zoo (2001)ISBN 1-57768-826-0 (Level 1)
- Country Fair (2002) ISBN 1-57768-827-9 (Level 1)
- Show and Tell (2002) ISBN 1-57768-835-X (Level 1)
- Beach Day (2001) ISBN 1-57768-844-9 (Level 1)
- Tiger's Birthday (2001) ISBN 1-57768-828-7 (Level 2)
- A Day at Camp (2001) ISBN 1-57768-836-8 (Level 2)
- The New Fire Truck (2001) ISBN 1-57768-843-0 (Level 2)
- Grandma's Garden (2001) ISBN 1-57768-846-5 (Level 2)
- Our Tree House (2001) ISBN 1-57768-833-3 (Level 3)
- Goodnight, Little Critter (2001) (Level 3)
- Class Trip (2001) ISBN 1-57768-845-7 (Level 3)
- New Kid in Town (2001) ISBN 1-57768-829-5 (Level 3)
- Helping Mom (2000)
- Little Critters' The Best Present (2000) ISBN 0-606-18923-8
- Our Park (2000) ISBN 1-57768-807-4
- Field Day (2000) ISBN 1-57768-813-9
- Camping Out (2001) ISBN 1-57768-806-6
- The Mixed-up Morning (2001) ISBN 1-57768-808-2
- Our Friend Sam (2001) ISBN 1-57768-815-5
- My Trip to the Farm (2001) ISBN 1-57768-817-1
- No One Can Play (2001) ISBN 1-57768-804-X
- Play Ball (2001) ISBN 1-57768-803-1
- A Yummy Lunch (2001) ISBN 1-57768-809-0
- Surprise! (2002) ISBN 1-57768-638-1
- Harvest Time (2003) ISBN 1-57768-578-4
- We Love You, Little Critter (2003)
- The Little Christmas Tree (2003) ISBN 1-57768-583-0
- Christmas for Miss Kitty (2003) ISBN 1-57768-584-9
- Play It Safe (2004) ISBN 1-57768-586-5
- Skating Day (2004) ISBN 1-57768-588-1

=== Boardbooks ===
Published by Little Simon (Simon & Schuster), Random House, Golden Books, GT Publishing and HarperFestival

- Little Critter's Play with Me (1982) ISBN 0-307-12269-7
- Astronaut Critter (1986) ISBN 0-671-61142-9
- Construction Critter (1986) ISBN 1-57719-397-0
- Cowboy Critter (1986) ISBN 0-671-61141-0
- Fireman Critter (1986) ISBN 0-671-61143-7
- Police Critter (1986) ISBN 0-671-61140-2
- Mail Critter (1987) ISBN 0-671-61144-5
- Doctor Critter (1987) ISBN 0-671-61147-X
- Sailor Critter (1987) ISBN 0-671-61146-1
- Little Critter's Day (1990) ISBN 0-307-06107-8
- Little Critter at Play (1990) ISBN 0-307-06106-X
- Little Critter (Booktivity) ISBN 0-307-05579-5
- Little Critter Colors (1992) ISBN 0-88029-830-8
- Little Critter Numbers (1992) ISBN 0-679-87355-4
- Little Critter Shapes (1992) ISBN 0-88029-832-4
- Little Critter's ABC's (1993) ISBN 0-88029-831-6
- Little Critter Cowboy (1996) ISBN 1-57719-258-3 (edited 10 page version of the 14 page Cowboy Critter)
- Little Critter Doctor (1996) ISBN 1-57719-104-8 (edited 10 page version of the 14 page Doctor Critter)
- Little Critter Astronaut (1996) ISBN 1-57719-089-0 (edited 10 page version of the 14 page Astronaut Critter)
- Little Critter Policeman (1996)(edited 10 page version of the 14 page Police Critter)
- Little Critter Construction (1996) (edited 10 page version of the 14 page Construction Critter, also released as a part of the Little Critter Construction Playset) ISBN 1-57719-655-4
- Little Critter Sailor (1998) ISBN 1-57719-396-2 (edited 10 page version of the 14 page Sailor Critter)
- Little Critter All Grown Up! (1999) ISBN 1-57719-648-1 (Collection containing the edited versions of the 4 books: Doctor, Sailor, Cowboy, and Construction)
- Just a Dump Truck (2004) ISBN 0-06-053968-2
- Just a Tugboat (2004) ISBN 0-06-053967-4
- Little Critter: A Busy Day (box set of 4 mini-board books) (August, 2011) ISBN 1-4027-8411-2

=== Lift-a-Flap Books ===
Published by multiple publishing houses. Some were originally released as hardcovers and then later re-released as Chunky Flap Board Books (two ISBN numbers are listed when this is the case).

- Where's Kitty (1991) ISBN 0-88029-864-2, ISBN 0-679-87343-0
- Where is My Frog? (1991) ISBN 0-88029-863-4, ISBN 0-679-87344-9
- Where's My Sneaker? (1991) ISBN 0-88029-793-X, ISBN 0-679-87370-8
- Little Critter's Hansel & Gretel: A Lift the Flap Book (1991) ISBN 0-88029-797-2, ISBN 0-679-87369-4
- Little Critter's Jack and the Beanstalk (1991) ISBN 0-88029-798-0, ISBN 0-679-87345-7
- Little Critter's Little Red Riding Hood (1991) ISBN 0-88029-866-9, ISBN 0-679-87346-5
- Just an Easter Egg (1998; written by Erica Farber and John Sansevere) ISBN 1-57719-299-0
- Just a Magic Trick (1998; written by Erica Farber and John Sansevere) ISBN 1-57719-298-2

=== Activity books ===
- Little Critter: My Stories: Write and Draw Your Own Stories (1991) ISBN 0-307-05830-1
- Little Critter Stand Ups to Color and Share (1992) (comes with 6 stand ups and stickers)
- Little Critter Favorite Things (1994) ISBN 0-307-08573-2 (a coloring book)
- Little Critter's Day at the Farm (with reusable stickers) (1994) ISBN 0-590-48641-1 (and ISBN 0-590-32804-2)
- Little Critter's Holiday Fun Sticker Book (1994) ISBN 0-590-48640-3
- Little Critter Shapes & Colors Coloring Book
- Little Critter Dots and Mazes (Golden First Fun)
- Little Critter's Song and Activity Book (1996)
- Little Critter's Halloween: A Coloring and Activity Book (1997) (also came with Spooky Halloween Kit which included the book The Magic Pumpkin (Little Sister), a Flashlight, and a Trick-Or-Treat Bag). ISBN 1-57719-236-2
- Little Critter's Christmas: A Coloring and Activity Book (1997) ISBN 1-57719-230-3
- Little Critter's Backseat Busy Book (1999)
- Painting the Seasons with Little Critter (2003) HarperCollins, ISBN 0-06-053956-9
- Fun at School with Little Critter (2004)

=== Collections ===
- Little Critter's Bedtime Storybook (1987) (includes: The Fussy Princess, The Grumpy Old Rabbit, The Day the Wind Stopped Blowing, The Bear Who Wouldn't Share, and some bumper "Bedtime" segments)
- Two-minute Little Critter Stories: Eight favorite stories (1990) ISBN 0-307-12192-5 (Includes: Just A Mess, Just Me and My Babysitter, I Just Forgot, Just Me and My Puppy, I Was So Mad, Just My Friends and Me, When I Get Bigger, and Just Go to Bed)
- Thrills and Spills (1991) (Early Bird Series Big Books: 19.5 × 16.2) ISBN 0-8273-4120-2 (Contains four stories: Just for You by Mercer Mayer, Jamberry by Bruce Degen, The Gingerbread Boy by Paul Galdone, and Baby Days)
- Just Me and My Family (1997) (A box set of four separate Golden Look Look books)
- Just Me and My Family: Six Story Books in One (1999) ISBN 0-307-34094-5 (contains: Just Me and My Mom, Just Me and My Dad, Just Me and My Little Brother, Just Grandpa and Me, Just Grandma and Me, and Just Me and My Puppy)
- Little Critter Read-It-Yourself Storybook: Six Funny Easy to Read Stories (2000) ISBN 0-307-16840-9 (contains: Little Critter's This Is My House, Little Critter's These Are My Pets, Little Critter's Little Sister's Birthday, Little Critter's This Is My School, Little Critter's This Is My Friend, and Little Critter's Staying Overnight).
- Growing Every Day (A Little Critter Collection) (2002) ISBN 0-9654579-6-6 (Contains: Just Go to Bed, When I Get Bigger, Just a Mess, Just Going to the Dentist, Just Lost and Just Me in the Tub)
- Feelings and Manners (2002) ISBN 0-9654579-5-8 (Contains: All by Myself, I was So Mad, Me Too!, I Just Forgot, I'm Sorry, and Just a Bully)
- Little Critter Storybook Collection (2005) ISBN 0-06-082009-8 (Contains 7 stories)
- Just a Little Critter Collection: 7 Books Inside (2005) ISBN 0-375-83255-6 (contains: Just For You, When I Get Bigger, I Was So Mad, All By Myself, Just Go To Bed, Just A Mess, and I Just Forgot)
- Little Critter: Just a Storybook Collection (2012) ISBN 0-062-13452-3
- Little Critter: Phonics Fun (a My First I Can Read box set of 12 mini-paperbacks)
  - 1. Just Critters Who Care
  - 2. Just Saving My Money
  - 3. Just Helping My Dad
  - 4. A Green, Green Garden
  - 5. Just A Little Sick
  - 6. Going To The Firehouse
  - 7. What A good kitty
  - 8. Snowball soup
  - 9. To The Rescue
  - 10. Fall Festival
  - 11. Going To The Sea Park
  - 12. This is My Town
- Little Critter: Bedtime Stories (a box set featuring stickers, a poster, and 6 paperback books)

=== Little Critter workbooks ===
By Spectrum & Brighter Child (for Homeschool)

- Little Critter Math: Grade Pre K (2001) ISBN 0-7696-3009-X or 1577685792
- Little Critter Math: Grade K (2001) ISBN 0-7696-3010-3 or 1577688007
- Little Critter Math: Grade 1 (2001) ISBN 0-7696-3011-1
- Little Critter Math: Grade 2 (2001) ISBN 0-7696-3012-X
- Little Critter Phonics: Grade Pre K (2002) ISBN 0-7696-3029-4
- Little Critter Phonics: Grade K (2002) ISBN 0-7696-3030-8
- Little Critter Phonics: Grade 1 (2002) ISBN 0-7696-3031-6
- Little Critter Phonics: Grade 2 (2002) ISBN 0-7696-3032-4
- Little Critter Reading: Grade Pre K (2002) ISBN 0-7696-3022-7
- Little Critter Reading: Grade K (2002) ISBN 0-7696-3020-0
- Little Critter Reading: Grade 1 (2002) ISBN 0-7696-3019-7
- Little Critter Reading: Grade 2 (2002) ISBN 0-7696-3021-9
- Little Critter Language Arts: Grade Pre K (2002)
- Little Critter Language Arts: Grade K (2002)
- Little Critter Language Arts: Grade 1 (2002)
- Little Critter Language Arts: Grade 2 (2002)
- Little Critter Beginning Writing: Grade Pre K (2002)
- Little Critter Beginning Writing: Grade K (2002)
- Little Critter Beginning Writing: Grade 1 (2002)
- Little Critter Beginning Writing: Grade 2 (2002)
- Little Critter Basic Concepts: Grade Pre K (2002)
- Little Critter Basic Concepts: Grade K (2002)
- Little Critter Basic Concepts: Grade 1 (2002)
- Little Critter Basic Concepts: Grade 2 (2002)

=== Critters of the Night ===
AKA Creepy Critters, all written by Erica Farber and J. R. Sansevere (illustrated by Mercer Mayer)

- Werewolves for Lunch (1995)
- No Howling in the House (1996)
- The Headless Gargoyle (1996)
- To Catch a Little Fish (1996)
- If You Dream a Dragon (1996)
- Purple Pickle Juice (1996)
- Zombies Don't Do Windows (1996)
- The Vampire Brides (1996) ISBN 0-679-87360-0
- The Goblin's Birthday Party(1996) ISBN 0-679-87373-2
- Old Howl Hall Big Lift-And-look Book (1996) ISBN 0-679-88019-4
- Pirate Soup (Pictureback Shape Books) ISBN 0-679-87364-3
- Night of the Walking Dead Part 1 ISBN 0-679-87371-6 (1997)
- Night of the Walking Dead Part 2 ISBN 0-679-87372-4 (1997)
- Love You to Pieces: (24 Spooky Punch-out Valentines) (1997) ISBN 0-679-88709-1
- Critters of the Night Glow-In-The-Dark Book (1997) ISBN 0-679-88707-5
- Chomp Chomp! (1998)
- Ooey Gooey (1998)
- Roast and Toast (1998)
- Midnight Snack (1999)
- Kiss of the Mermaid (1999)
- Mummy Pancakes (Tattoo Tales) (with over 20 tattoos) (1997) ISBN 0-679-87378-3
- Zoom on My Broom (2001)

=== Mercer Mayer's LC + the Critter Kids ===
All written by Erica Farber and J. R. Sansevere (illustrated by Mercer Mayer)

- My Teacher Is a Vampire (1994)
- The Secret Code (1994)
- The Purple Kiss (1994)
- The Mummy's Curse (1994)
- Top Dog (1994)
- Surf's Up (1994)
- The Pizza War (1994)
- The Cat's Meow (1994)
- Showdown at the Arcade (1994)
- The Ghost of Goose Island (1995)
- Mystery at Big Horn Ranch (1995)
- The E-Mail Mystery (1995)
- The Swamp Thing (1995)
- Backstage Pass (1995)
- The Alien: An Adventure from Outer Space (1995)
- The Prince: An Adventure in the Middle Ages (1995)
- The Haunted House (1995) ISBN 0-307-66180-6
- Jaguar Paw: An Adventure in the Land of the Ancient Maya (1995)
- Golden Eagle: An Adventure on a Native American Desert Preserve (1995)
- Octopus Island (1996)
- The Blue Ribbon Mystery (1996)
- Circus of the Ghouls (1996)
- Little Shop of Magic (1996)
- Kiss of the Vampire (1996)

=== Other Little Critter titles ===
- I am Hiding (1992) ISBN 0-88029-980-0
- I am Helping (1992) ISBN 0-88029-978-9
- I am Playing (1992) ISBN 0-88029-979-7
- I am Sharing (1992) ISBN 0-88029-981-9
- I Smell Christmas: A Nose Tickler (1997) ISBN 1-57719-221-4
- Little Critter's These Are My Pets (1988)
- Little Critter's The Trip (1988) (Originally published as an ABC style book, and then as an edited story with fewer pages in 1997).
- Little Critter's The Picnic (1988)
- Little Critter's Staying Overnight (1988)
- Little Critter's This Is My Friend (1989) ISBN 0-307-61685-1
- Little Critter's This Is My School (1990)
- Little Critter's Christmas Book (1989) ISBN 0-307-15849-7
- Little Critter's Spooky Halloween Party (1999)
- Little Critter's The Night Before Christmas (1995) ISBN 0-679-87352-X
- The Grumpy Old Rabbit: Little Critter's Bedtime Storybook (1987) (Taco Bell Promotional Book)
- The Bear Who Wouldn't Share: Little Critter's Bedtime Storybook (1987) ASIN B00072HVVC (published by Western Publishing)
- The Fussy Princess: Little Critter's Bedtime Storybook: (1989) ISBN 0-307-62090-5
- Little Critter's Picture Dictionary (2001) ISBN 1-57768-839-2
- Little Critter's Favorite Things (1994)
- I Didn't Know That (by Gina and Mercer Mayer)
- Mercer Mayer's Little Critter Lacing Cards (1992) (toy)

== Little Monster series ==
Little Monster's Bedtime Book by Mercer Mayer

Little Monster is an anthropomorphic character created by Mercer Mayer. He is a dinosaur-like dragon. Little Monster first appeared in the 1977 book Little Monster's Word Book, but many characters in the Little Monster series were first introduced in the 1975 book One Monster After Another and the 1976 book Professor Wormbog in Search for the Zipperump-A-Zoo.

Books that feature the character Little Monster:

- Little Monster's Word Book (1977) ISBN 0-307-65766-3
- Little Monster's Alphabet Book (1978) ISBN 0-307-61847-1
- Little Monster's Counting Book (1978) ISBN 0-307-61844-7
- Little Monster's Neighborhood (1978) ISBN 0-307-61849-8
- Little Monster at School (1978) ISBN 0-307-61845-5
- Little Monster at Home (1978) ISBN 0-307-61846-3
- Little Monster at Work (1978) ISBN 0-307-13736-8
- Little Monster's Bedtime Book (1978) ISBN 0-307-61848-X
- Little Monster's Library (box set containing the first 6 Little Monster books and 6 punch-out paper monsters) (1978) ISBN 0-307-15525-0
- Little Monster's You-Can-Make-It Book (1978) ISBN 0-307-15802-0
- Little Monster's Mother Goose (1979) ISBN 0-307-13742-2
- Little Monster's Scratch and Sniff Mystery (1980) ISBN 0-307-13546-2
- Little Monster's Sports Fun Sticker Book (with reusable stickers) (1985) ISBN 0-590-48644-6
- Little Monster's Moving Day Sticker Book (with reusable stickers) (1995) ISBN 0-590-48643-8
- Little Monster Private Eye: The Smelly Mystery (1998) ISBN 1-57719-319-9 (re-release edited version of Scratch and Sniff Mystery without Scratch and Sniff Spots, all dialogue balloons removed, major text changes, and 5 pages shorter) (also released as part of a Detective Kit gift set ISBN 1-57719-259-1)
- Little Monster Private Eye: The Lost Wish (by Erica Farber and J. R. Sansevere) (1998) ISBN 1-57719-318-0
- Little Monster Private Eye: How The Zebra Lost His Stripes (by Erica Farber and J. R. Sansevere)(1998) ISBN 1-57719-317-2 (also released with the Little Monster Private Eye Goes on Safari gift set ISBN 1-57719-306-7)
- Mercer Mayer's Little Monster Private Eye: The Mummy Mystery (by Erica Farber) (also released with The Treasure of the Nile gift set ISBN 1-57719-661-9)
- Mercer Mayer's Little Monster Private Eye: 101 Penguins (by Erica Farber and J. R. Sansevere) (1998) (also came in a 101 Penguins A Polar Adventure gift set with a Snow Globe that has two penguins in it) ISBN 1-57719-395-4
- Mercer Mayer's Little Monster Private Eye: The Bubble Gum Pirates (by Erica Farber and J. R. Sansevere) (1998) ISBN 1-57719-604-X (also came as part of a pirate themed gift set featuring a sword and other items)
- Mercer Mayer's Little Monster Treasury Book (contains 11 previously released Little Monster stories, some edited)

=== Professor Wormbog series ===
Creatures in the Professor Wormbog series tend to also appear in the Little Monster series of books.

- Professor Wormbog in Search for the Zipperump-A-Zoo (1976)
- Professor Wormbog's Gloomy Kerploppus: A Book of Great Smells (and a Heart-Warming Story, Besides) (1977)
- Professor Wormbog's Cut It, Glue It, Tape It, Do It (1980)
- Professor Wormbog's Crazy Cut-Ups (1980) ISBN 0-307-15807-1

=== Other Little Monster related books ===
Books that feature characters that also appear in the Little Monster and Professor Wormbog series.

- One Monster After Another (1974)
- How the Trollusk Got His Hat (1979)
- Mercer's Monsters (a "Golden Book of Picture Postcards" with verses by Seymour Reit) (1977) ISBN 0-307-11105-9

== Boy, Dog, Frog series ==
A series of 6 wordless books. These have been re-released in many formats, but they are usually smaller in size.

- A Boy, a Dog and a Frog (1967)
- Frog, Where Are You? (1969)
- A Boy, a Dog, a Frog, and a Friend (1971)
- Frog on His Own (1973)
- Frog Goes to Dinner (1974)
- One Frog Too Many (1975)
- Four Frogs In a Box (1976) (collection of the first four "Frog" mini-books in a box set) ISBN 0-8037-2776-3

== Tink Tonk series ==
AKA A Tiny Tink! Tonk! Tale series published by Bantam Books. Also see the Mercer Mayer Computer Software section for the video game titles related to this series that were developed by Mercer Mayer.

- Tinka Bakes a Cake (1984) ISBN 0-553-15295-5
- Tink Goes Fishing (1984) ISBN 0-553-15297-1
- Tuk Takes a Trip (1984) ISBN 0-553-15296-3
- Tonk Gives a Magic Show (1985) ISBN 0-553-15313-7
- Teep and Beep Go to Sleep (1985) ISBN 0-553-15298-X
- Zoomer Builds a Racing Car (1985) ISBN 0-553-15314-5

== "There's a..." series ==
- There's a Nightmare in My Closet (AKA There's a Nightmare in my Cupboard – Australia) (1968)
- There's an Alligator Under My Bed (1987)
- There's Something in My Attic (AKA There's Something Spooky in My Attic) (1988)
- There's Something There: Three Bedtime Classics (1998) ISBN 0-7607-1173-9 (Re-prints Nightmare, Alligator, and Attic)
- There Are Monsters Everywhere (2005) ISBN 0-8037-0621-9

== One word series ==
A series of virtually wordless books featuring a male and a female anthropomorphic hippopotamus or elephant and the word that is in the title.

- Hiccup (1976)
- Ah-choo (1976)
- Oops (1977)

== Liverwurst series ==
Both books in this series are written by Mercer Mayer, but illustrated by Steven Kellogg:

- Appelard and Liverwurst (1978)
- Liverwurst is Missing (1981)

== Fairy tale and classic story re-telling ==
- Beauty and the Beast (with Marianna Mayer) (1978) ISBN 1-58717-017-5
- East of the Sun & West of the Moon (1980)
- Favorite Tales from Grimm (Retold by Nancy Garden) (1982)
- The Sleeping Beauty (1984) ISBN 0-02-765340-4
- A Christmas Carol (1986) (retold with mice, originally by Charles Dickens) ISBN 0-02-730310-1
- The Pied Piper of Hamelin (1987)

== Moral Tales series ==
Wordless flip-books featuring two stories

- Two Moral Tales (1974) featuring:

"Bird's New Hat"
"Bear's New Clothes"

- Two More Moral Tales (1974) featuring:

"Sly Fox's Folly"
"Just a Pig at Heart"

== Other Mercer Mayer books ==
- Terrible Troll (1968) (re-released as The Bravest Knight in May, 2007 with ISBN 0-8037-3206-6)
- If I Had (1968) (re-released as If I Had a Gorilla)
- I Am a Hunter (1969)
- A Special Trick (1970)
- Mine! (with Marianna Mayer) (1970)
- Me and My Flying Machine (1971)
- The Queen Always Wanted to Dance (1971)
- A Silly Story (1972)
- Bubble Bubble (1973)
- Mrs. Beggs and the Wizard (re-released as The Wizard Comes to Town) (1973) ISBN 1-57768-388-9
- Walk, Robot, Walk (1974)
- You're the Scaredy-Cat (1974)
- What Do You Do with a Kangaroo? (1974)
- The Great Cat Chase: A Wordless Book (1975) (originally released with black and white illustrations, it was re-released as just The Great Cat Chase in the 1990s with added words and in color)
- Liza Lou and the Yeller Belly Swamp (1976) ISBN 0-8193-0801-3
- Herbert the Timid Dragon (1980) ISBN 0-307-13732-5
- Whinnie the Lovesick Dragon (illustrated by Diane Dawson Hearn) (1986)
- Mercer Mayer's a Monster Followed Me to School (1991) ISBN 0-307-61466-2
- Rosie's Mouse (1992) ISBN 0-307-11468-6
- Shibumi and the Kitemaker (1999) ISBN 0-7614-5145-5
- The Rocking Horse Angel (2000) ISBN 0-7614-5072-6
- The Little Drummer Mouse (2006) ISBN 0-8037-3147-7 (Mercer Mayer also narrates the audio version, and he wrote the music)
- Octopus Soup (a wordless book) (2011) ISBN 0-7614-5812-3
- Too Many Dinosaurs (2011) ISBN 0-8234-2316-6

== Illustrations for other authors' books ==
- The Master and Margarita – by Mikhail Bulgakov (1967 English edition by Harper & Row) (features a winking cat holding a gun on the front cover)
- Logan's Run – by William F. Nolan and George Clayton Johnson (Dial Press, 1967 first printing hardcover)
- Outside My Window – by Liesel Moak Skorpen (1968) (re-issued 2004) ISBN 0-06-050774-8
- The Boy Who Made A Million – by Sidney Offit (1968)
- Golden Butter – by Sheila LaFarge (1969)
- Boy Was I Mad – by Kathryn Hitte (1969) ISBN 0-8193-0273-2
- The Mousechildren and the Famous Collector – by Warren Fine (1970)
- Jack Tar – by Jean Russell Larson (1970) ISBN 0-8255-5200-1
- The Bird of Time – by Jane Yolen (1971) ISBN 0-690-14425-3
- Altogether, One At a Time – by E.L. Konigsburg (1971) ISBN 0-689-71290-1
- Good-bye Kitchen – by Mildred Kantrowitz (1972) ISBN 0-8193-0542-1
- Kim Ann and the Yellow Machine – by Candida Palmer (1972) ISBN 0-663-22972-3
- While the Horses Galloped to London – by Mabel Watts (1973) ISBN 0-8193-0652-5
- The Greenhouse – by Antonia Lamb (1974 paperback version)
- The Figure In the Shadows – by John Bellairs (1975) (Re-released in 2004 as A John Bellairs Mystery Featuring Lewis Barnavelt: The Figure in the Shadows) ISBN 0-14-240260-5
- A Poison Tree and Other Poems – written by various poets, poems selected by and illustrated by Mercer Mayer (1977)
- A Book of Unicorns – by Welleran Poltarnees (1978) (various illustrators including a Mercer Mayer's Unicorn illustration from Amanda Dreaming)
- The Dictopedia: A–L – by Pleasant T. Rowland (1979) (an Addison-Wesley Reading Program anthology) – features "The Case of the Gingerbread Ghost" (AKA "The Gingerbread Ghost") by Shirleyann Costigan a seven-page story with five unique full color illustrations by Mercer Mayer ISBN 0-201-20800-8
- The Dictopedia: M–Z – by Pleasant T. Rowland (an Addison-Wesley Reading Program anthology) – features one blue, black, and white illustration by Mercer Mayer for James A. Emanuel's "A Small Discovery" poem (the illustration also appeared in Mercer Mayer's A Poison Tree and Other Poems) (1979) ISBN 0-201-20850-4

=== Illustrations for George Mendoza's books ===
Books written by George Mendoza that Mercer Mayer illustrated:

- The Crack in the Wall & Other Terribly Weird Tales (1968) ISBN 0-8037-1547-1
- The Gillygoofang (1968) ISBN 0-8037-2899-9

=== Illustrations for Jan Wahl's books ===
Book by Jan Wahl that Mercer Mayer illustrated:

- Margaret's Birthday (1971)
- Grandmother Told Me (1972) ISBN 0-316-91744-3

=== Illustrations for Jay Williams' books ===
Book by Jay Williams that Mercer Mayer illustrated:

- Everyone Knows What a Dragon Looks Like (1976)
- The Reward Worth Having (1977)

=== Illustrations for John D. Fitzgerald's Great Brain series ===
Books from John D. Fitzgerald's The Great Brain series that were originally illustrated by Mercer Mayer. Some later releases had new front covers by a different illustrator, but were still illustrated by Mercer Mayer on the inside. The Great Brain series by John D. Fitzgerald

1. The Great Brain (1967) (by John D. Fitzgerald)
2. More Adventures of the Great Brain (1969) (by John D. Fitzgerald) ISBN 0-8037-5819-7
3. Me and My Little Brain (1971) (by John D. Fitzgerald) ISBN 0-8037-5531-7
4. The Great Brain at the Academy (1972) (by John D. Fitzgerald) ISBN 0-8037-3039-X
5. The Great Brain Reforms (1973) (by John D. Fitzgerald) ISBN 0-8037-3067-5
6. The Return of the Great Brain (1974) (by John D. Fitzgerald) ISBN 0-8037-7403-6
7. The Great Brain Does it Again (1975) (by John D. Fitzgerald) ISBN 0-8037-5065-X

=== Illustrations for Barbara Wersba's books ===
Books by Barbara Wersba that Mercer Mayer illustrated:

- Let Me Fall Before I Fly (1971)
- Amanda Dreaming (1973)

== Magazine appearances ==
- Harper's Magazine, April 1967. Vol. 284. No. 1403. – features, The War with the Birds by Philip Wagner with drawings by Mercer Mayer)
- Harper's Magazine, June 1967. Vol. 234. No. 1405. – features, The Riddle of the Dangerous Bean: A Scientific Detective Story by Judith R. Marcus and Gerald Cohen with a drawing by Mercer Mayer)
- Harper's Magazine, August 1967. Vol. 235. No. 1407. – features, What Keeps Nixon Running by Stephen Hess and David S. Broder with a drawing by Mercer Mayer)
- Children's Digest, December 1968 – front cover illustration
- Penthouse: The International Magazine for Men, Vol. 5, #10, June 1974. Illustration for “Okay Tribesmen, Now Hear This” by Henry Morgan (page 98)
- Penthouse: The International Magazine for Men, Vol. 6, #5, January 1975. Illustration for “Good Eats” by Henry Morgan (page 80)
- Penthouse: The International Magazine for Men, Vol. 6, #6, February 1975. Illustration for “Another Damn Year is Under Way” by Henry Morgan (page 82)
- Penthouse: The International Magazine for Men, Vol. 6, #7, March 1975. Illustration for “The Irish” by Henry Morgan (page 80)
- Cricket: The Magazine for Children, Vol. 4 No. 7 (March, 1977) – reprints Hiccup.
- Cricket: The Magazine for Children, Vol. 4 No. 9 (May, 1977) – reprints Ah-Choo.

== Mercer Mayer recordings (audio books and other) ==
=== Audio books ===
What do You do with a Kangaroo (released on cassette, CD, and download) – read by Jane Casserly There's a Nightmare in My Closet (released as an Audible.com download) – read by Mo Godin

==== Little Critter ====
Most of these are from Disneyland Records and Little Golden Books (usually labeled as a "Little Golden Book & Cassette" or "Little Golden Book & Record"). These are books that came with a word for word audio recording on record (speed = 33 1/3, size = 7") or cassette tape of someone reading the story. They usually included music, sound effects, and original songs too. Sometimes the cassettes were labeled "Record your own story" on the B-side (with the original recording on the A-side). "SEE the pictures HEAR the record READ the book", was a catch phrase that was written on most of these books.

- Just For You (1984) ASIN B000JFJCIM
- Just Me and My Dad
- Merry Christmas Mom & Dad (Includes the original songs "Merry Christmas Mom and Dad" and "Dear Santa") Series # 226 (1983) ISBN per Amazon was 9-9963-6247-7 (out of print)
- Just Go To Bed (1986) ISBN 0-307-13798-8
- Just Grandpa and Me (1986) ISBN 0-307-13942-5
- Just Grandma and Me (1986) ISBN per Amazon was 9-9988-8357-1
- Just Me and My Babysitter (1986) ISBN 0-307-13943-3
- When I Get Bigger (1986) ISBN 0-307-13799-6
- Little Critter's The Night Before Christmas ISBN 978-1-4027-6799-9

=== Mercer Mayer recordings ===
Audio CDs that are available on Mercer Mayer's official site.

- Mercer Mayer Alligator Under My Bed and Other Story Songs CD (featuring the songs: "What Do You Do With A Kangaroo," "Critters Of The Night (Theme)," "Alligator Under My Bed," "Let's Go Camping," "Me And My Mom," "If I Had A Gorilla," "Big Paw's Coming," "The World Goes Around")
- The Little Drummer Mouse A Christmas Story CD (featuring the story read by Mercer Mayer and the songs: "Three Kings From Far Away," "I Wish," "The New Baby King," "Me And My Drum," "The Blessing," "You Must Be From The City")

=== Other known Mercer Mayer songs ===
These songs are either mentioned on the official Mercer Mayer website or featured on it, but are not currently available otherwise.

- "Sunshine" (AKA "Sunshine Makes You Sneeze")
- "My Momma Said" (AKA "Clean Up Your Room")
- "Clean up My Doggie" (AKA "My Doggie Lies in a Mud Puddle")

== Mercer Mayer computer software ==
=== CD-Roms ===
The CD-Roms usually included the original story and additional material (animations, audio) for fun and educational purposes (they were produced in association with Mercer Mayer's company Big Tuna New Media, LLC).

The Tink! Tonk! series of games were educational and action video game style.

- Mercer Mayer's Just Grandma and Me (part of the Living Books series) (1992) ISBN 1-57135-002-0
- Mercer Mayer's Little Monster at School (part of the Living Books series) CD-Rom (1994) ISBN 1-57135-037-3
- Mercer Mayer's Just Me and My Dad CD-Rom (1996)
- Mercer Mayer's Just Me and My Mom CD-Rom (1996)
- The Smelly Mystery Starring Mercer Mayer's Little Monster, Private Eye CD-Rom (1997) ISBN 1-56893-402-5
- The Mummy Mystery Starring Mercer Mayer's Little Monster, Private Eye CD-Rom (2001)
- Mercer Mayer's Little Critter Just Me and My Grandpa CD-Rom (1998)
- Mercer Mayer's Little Critter and the Great Race CD-Rom (2001)
- Tink! Tonk! Tink's Adventure Atari / Commodore 64 /Apple II (C64) (Sprout Software)
- Tink! Tonk! Tonk in the Land of Buddy Bots Atari / C64 /Apple II (Sprout Software)
- Tink! Tonk! Tinka's Mazes Atari / C64 / Apple II (Sprout Software)
- Tink! Tonk! Tuk Goes to Town Atari / C64 / Apple II (Sprout Software)
- Tink! Tonk! Tink's Subtraction Fair Atari / C64 / Apple II (Sprout Software)
- Tink! Tonk! Castle Clobber Atari / C64 / Apple II (Sprout Software)
- Forbidden Castle IBM PC / Apple II (Mindscape) (1985)

==== Reception ====
Computer Gaming World in 1993 stated that Just Grandma and Me's "quality ... is unmatched and goes with the highest recommendation".

== Announced but unreleased books ==
=== Critter Kids ===
This is a list of Critter Kids books with dates originally scheduled for late 2006 but they have yet to be released:

- Danger Down Under (by Erica Farber and Mercer Mayer) (Date unknown) ISBN 0-7696-4774-X
- The Return of the Dinosaurs (by Erica Farber and Mercer Mayer) (Date unknown) ISBN 0-7696-4772-3
- Canyon River Camp (by Erica Farber and Mercer Mayer) (Date unknown) ISBN 0-7696-4773-1
- The Secrets of Snowy Mountain (by Erica Farber and Mercer Mayer) (Date unknown) ISBN 0-7696-4776-6
- The Critter Kids Talent Show (by Erica Farber and Mercer Mayer) (Date unknown) ISBN 0-7696-4777-4
- The Mystery of the Missing Vase (by Erica Farber and Mercer Mayer) (Date unknown) ISBN 0-7696-4775-8
