= Kinuko Y. Craft =

Japanese-born American painter (born 1940)

- Born: Kinuko Yamabe; January 3, 1940 (age 86); Kanazawa, Ishikawa Prefecture, Japan
- Education: Kanazawa College of Art (BFA)
- Spouse: Mahlon F. Craft
- Awards: World Fantasy Awards – Best Artist; 2011
- Website: The Art of Kinuko Y. Craft

Kinuko Yamabe Craft (born January 3, 1940) is a Japanese-born American painter, illustrator, and fantasy artist.

== Biography ==
Moon goddess pencil drawing by the artist

Kinuko Yamabe Craft was born in Kanazawa, Ishikawa Prefecture, Japan, on January 3, 1940. She graduated with a Bachelor of Fine Arts in 1964 from the Kanazawa College of Art. After graduating, she came to the United States in 1964 to study at the School of the Art Institute of Chicago, where she continued her studies in design and illustration. A majority of her earlier work was for the editorial and advertising market.

Craft illustrated the cover art of the older editions of Shakespeare's work for the Folger Library. She has a passionate love of European fine art and draws on a deep knowledge of European art history in creating her work. She is most inspired by the works of Leonardo da Vinci, the Pre-Raphaelites, and Symbolist painters. Her work is done with a combination of artist oils and watercolor on clayboard gesso panels.

Craft has illustrated eight picture books (fairy tale and classic mythology) designed for children and young readers. Since the mid-1990s, she has concentrated her efforts on art for fantasy book jackets. Her art has included paintings for the book covers of many well-known fantasy authors such as Patricia A. McKillip, Juliet Marillier, and Tanith Lee. She has also designed opera posters, fairy tale books, and painted cover art for many national magazines such as Time, Newsweek, and National Geographic.

She has collaborated with many authors and worked with her husband, Mahlon F. Craft, and her daughter, Marie Charlotte Craft. Her original paintings, drawings, and limited-edition prints are represented by Borsini-Burr Gallery in Montara, California, and other galleries.

Her art has been licensed on calendars, posters, greeting cards, and other consumer goods. Her fairy tale books are currently distributed in the USA, other English-speaking countries, Europe, Greece, China, and Korea. She has received numerous awards for her work, including several gold and silver medals from the Society of Illustrators, New York City. Craft’s work can be found in the collections of the National Portrait Gallery (United States), the Museum of American Illustration in New York City, the National Geographic Society, and other corporate collections.

She has been nominated five times since 2001 as a Best Artist for the World Fantasy Awards and won the World Fantasy Award for Best Artist in 2011.

Craft has also lectured and given workshops at numerous art schools, universities, and organizations, including Art Center College of Art and Design, San Jose State University, Rhode Island School of Design, Philadelphia College of the Arts (2012), and more.

In 2022, a 294-page collection featuring over 300 of Craft's drawings and paintings entitled Visions of Beauty was published by Borsini-Burr. The book received a nomination for a Locus Award for Best Illustration and Art Book, while Craft was nominated for Best Artist in 2023.

== Bibliography ==
=== Awards and honors ===
- Best Illustrated and Art Book Nominee, Kinuko Craft: Visions of Beauty, Locus Awards, 2023
- Best Artist Nominee, Kinuko Craft, Locus Awards, 2023
- Hall of Fame Inductee, Society of Illustrators, 2008
- Hamilton King Award, Society of Illustrators, 1987

=== Collections ===
- Kinuko Craft Drawings and Paintings: V. 1 (Imaginosis, 2007)
- Kinuko Craft: Visions of Beauty (Borsini-Burr, 2022)

=== Children's picture book illustration ===
- Rumpelstiltskin: A German Folk Tale from the Brothers Grimm, translated by Lucy Crane (Scott, Foresman, 1970)
- Gingerbread Children (Poems), by Ilo Orleans (Follett, 1973)
- Bear, Wolf and Mouse, by Jan Wahl (Follett, 1975)
- Come Play with Me, by Margaret Hillert (Modern Curriculum Press, 1975)
- Mother Goose ABC (Platt & Munk, 1977)
- What Is It?, by Margaret Hillert (Modern Curriculum Press, 1977; Perfection Learnin, 1989)
- Classics: A Child's Introduction to Treasure Island, Black Beauty, The Adventures of Tom Sawyer, and Robin Hood (Platt & Munk, 1977)
- The Tower of Geburah by John White (IVP, 1978 edition only)
- The Cookie House, by Margaret Hillert (Modern Curriculum Press, 1978)
- The Black Swan, by Paula Z. Hogan (Heinemann, 1979; Steck-Vaughn, 1987)
- The Elephant, by Paula Z. Hogan (Heinemann, 1980)
- Treasure Island, by Robert Louis Stevenson (Steck-Vaughn, 1980)
- Tales of the Ugly Ogres, by Corinne Denan (Troll Communications, 1980)
- The Twelve Dancing Princesses, by Marianna Mayer (Morrow Junior Books, 1989)
- Baba Yaga and Vasilisa the Brave, by Marianna Mayer (HarperCollins, 1994)
- Cupid and Psyche by M. Charlotte Craft (HarperCollins, 1996)
- Pegasus, by Marianna Mayer (HarperCollins, 1998)
- King Midas and the Golden Touch, by M. Charlotte Craft (HarperCollins, 1999)
- Cinderella, by Charles Perrault (SeaStar Books, 2000)
- The Adventures of Tom Thumb, by Marianna Mayer (Chronicle Books, 2001)
- Sleeping Beauty, by the Brothers Grimm (Wilhelm Grimm and Jacob Grimm) and Mahlon F. Craft (SeaStar Books] 2002; leather bound edition by Easton Press, 2006)
- Beauty & the Beast, by Jeanne-Marie Leprince de Beaumont and Mahlon F. Craft (Harper, 2016)

== Museum exhibitions ==
- The Cornish Colony Museum, Windsor, VT: Heroines in Literature (Winter 2006/2007)
- The 21st Century Museum of Contemporary Art, Kanazawa, Kanazawa, Japan: A Spring Night's Dream (Spring 2006)

== See also ==
- Books with cover art by Kinuko Y. Craft
