= Harold Darling =

Harold Darling may refer to:

- Harold Gordon Darling of J. Darling and Son, grain merchants
- Harold Darling was the pen name of Welleran Poltarnees
