= The Great Brain (film) =

- Directed by: Sidney Levin
- Written by: Alan Cassidy (writer); John D. Fitzgerald (novel The Great Brain)
- Produced by: Richard Bickerton
- Starring: Jimmy Osmond; Pat Delaney; Fran Ryan; Cliff Osmond
- Cinematography: Reed Smoot
- Edited by: Herbert H. Dow
- Music by: Don Costa; Merrill Jenson
- Distributed by: Osmond International
- Release date: June 1978
- Running time: 96 minutes
- Country: United States
- Language: English

The Great Brain is a 1978 American film directed by Sidney Levin and based on the Great Brain series of children's books by John Dennis Fitzgerald. it stars Fran Ryan, James A. Osmond (Jimmy), Cliff Osmond.

== Plot summary ==
In 1890s Utah, the adolescent Tom Fitzgerald has a reputation as a schemer. Calling himself "The Great Brain", Tom delights in swindling his friends and the residents of his small town. Soon the townsfolk tire of being bamboozled, and Tom finally faces his comeuppance. In the end, Tom uses his great brain to save the day and redeem himself. After his friend Andy loses his leg to gangrene and becomes depressed, Tom convinces Andy he can still do chores and play. Tom learns that helping people is more rewarding than swindling them.

== Cast ==
- Jimmy Osmond as Tom Fitzgerald
- Pat Delaney as Mama Fitzgerald
- Fran Ryan as Aunt Bertha
- Cliff Osmond as Mr. Kokovinis
- Arthur Roberts as Mr. Anderson
- Lynn Benisch as Mrs. Anderson
- Len Birman as Papa Fitzgerald
- James Jarnigan as J. D. Fitzgerald
- John Fredric Hart as Mr. Standish

== Production ==
Parts of the film were shot in Salt Lake City, Provo, and Orem in Utah.
