= John White (Christian author) =

British Christian author in Canada

- Born: 5 March 1924; Liverpool, England
- Died: 11 May 2002 (aged 78); Vancouver, British Columbia, Canada
- Occupations: author, missionary, psychiatrist, academic, pastor and speaker
- Spouse: Loretta May O'Hara

John White (1924–2002) was an evangelical Christian author and international speaker who worked with the International Fellowship of Evangelical Students of Latin America and published many books through InterVarsity Press.

White moved to Canada in 1965 and completed his residency in psychiatry in Winnipeg, Manitoba. He then served as associate professor of psychiatry at the University of Manitoba and also as pastor of Church of the Way.

White helped to start the Surrey Vineyard of Vancouver, British Columbia. He was also involved with the national Association of Vineyard Churches.

== Life ==
John White was born on March 5, 1924, in Liverpool, England. He grew up in Manchester.

White served in the Fleet Air Arm as a reconnaissance photographer during World War II. He completed medical training at Manchester University.

He went on various short-term mission trips, including beyond the Iron Curtain as a Bible smuggler.

White met Loretta Mae O'Hara in Pennsylvania at a missions conference on June 10. They married on June 25, 1955, and left for a mission to Bolivia with New Tribes Mission on October 25 of the same year.

They had five children while working as missionaries: Scott (born in Bolivia), Kevin and Liana (Argentina), and Miles and Leith (Peru).

The entire family left the mission field and moved to Winnipeg, Manitoba, Canada in 1965. White completed his residency in psychiatry and then took a position as associate professor of psychiatry at the University of Manitoba.

John and Loretta became involved in a small group, which they were asked to lead, and which would eventually become the Church of the Way, growing to around four hundred. After retiring in the 1980s White moved with his family to Pasadena, California, and concentrated on his writing.

In 1986 the White family moved again, this time to North Delta, British Columbia, to serve as assistant pastors at North Delta Vineyard Church which would eventually become Surrey Vineyard Church.

He died on May 11, 2002, after battling Alzheimer's disease and heart disease.

== Spirituality ==
White became involved in the Charismatic Movement, finding his entrance into the movement while taking a class by Dr. John Wimber at Fuller Theological Seminary.

== Christian academic work ==
White taught courses at Regent College.

== Books ==
=== Eros Defiled ===
One of White's earlier popular books is Eros Defiled which tackles the topic of Christians and sexual sin. White would later come to regret this book and its continuance in print because he no longer held that psychiatry was the answer to freedom from sexual sin. Instead, he recommended his later book entitled Eros Redeemed.

In the section on homosexuality in Eros Defiled John White describes how, as a junior high school student, he suffered sexual abuse at the hands of a Christian youth worker.

== Quotations ==
These quotations represent significant aspects of Dr. White's thought, with an emphasis on what might be considered the less orthodox and more exploratory areas.

- "[The Archives] stirred the most deeply in people. And I have a feeling that the stories in the historical records in scripture are far more important than the doctrines and prophetic utterances based on them. That we read to read the stories first. We need to focus on the stories because I’ve learned from my own experience that the stories are more powerful."

== Bibliography ==
- 1976 - The Cost of Commitment: The Way of the Cross is a Magnificent Obsession with a Heavenly Pearl, ISBN 978-0-8511-0392-1
- 1976 - The Fight: A Practical Handbook for Christian Living, ISBN 978-0-87784-777-9
- 1977 - Eros Defiled: The Christian and Sexual Sin, ISBN 978-0-87784-781-6
- 1977 - Daring to Draw Near: People in Prayer, ISBN 978-0-87784-788-5
- The Archives of Anthropos, ISBN 978-0-8308-1209-7:
  - 1978 - Book 3 - The Tower of Geburah (Illustrated by Kinuko Y. Craft), ISBN 0-87784-560-3
  - 1981 - Book 4 - The Iron Sceptre, ISBN 0-87784-589-1
  - 1986 - Book 1 - The Sword Bearer, ISBN 0-87784-590-5
  - 1989 - Book 2 - Gaal the Conqueror, ISBN 0-87784-591-3
  - 1995 - Book 5 - Quest for the King, ISBN 0-87784-592-1
  - 2001 - Book 6 - The Dark Lord's Demise, ISBN 0-87784-521-2
- 1979 - The Golden Cow: Materialism in the Twentieth-Century Church, ISBN 978-0-87784-490-7
- 1979 - Parents in Pain: Overcoming the Hurts and Frustration of Problem Children, ISBN 978-0-87784-582-9
- 1980 - Parents in Pain: Help and hope for troubled families, British edition of the above, some text adapted for British circumstances ISBN 978-0-85110-414-0
- 1982 - Flirting With the World: A Challenge to Loyalty, ISBN 978-0-87788-156-8
- 1982 - The Masks of Melancholy: A Christian Physician Looks at Depression & Suicide, ISBN 978-0-87784-980-3
- 1984 - Prayer, ISBN 978-0-87784-067-1
- 1984 - The Race: Discipleship for the Long Run, ISBN 978-0-87784-976-6
- 1985 - Healing the Wounded: The Costly Love of Church Discipline, ISBN 978-0-87784-533-1
- 1986 - Excellence in Leadership: Reaching Goals with Prayer, Courage and Determination, ISBN 978-0-87784-570-6
- 1987 - Putting the Soul Back in Psychology: When Secular Values Ignore Spiritual Realities, ISBN 978-0-87784-979-7
- 1987 - The Shattered Mirror: Reflections on Being Human, ISBN 978-0-85110-494-2
- 1988 - When the Spirit Comes with Power: Signs & Wonders Among God's People, ISBN 978-0-8308-1222-6
- 1990 - Parables: The Greatest Stories Ever Told (LifeGuide Topical Bible Studies)], ISBN 978-0-8308-1037-6
- 1990 - Magnificent Obsession: The Joy of Christian Commitment, ISBN 978-0-8308-3404-4
- 1991 - Changing on the Inside: The Keys to Spiritual Recovery and Lasting Change, ISBN 978-0-87784-591-1
- 1992 - Greater Than Riches: Daily Readings to Enrich Your Walk With God, ISBN 978-0-8308-1314-8
- 1992 - Church Discipline that Heals: Putting Costly Love Into Action, ISBN 978-0-8308-1315-5
- 1993 - Money Isn't God: So Why is the Church Worshiping It?, ISBN 978-0-8308-1380-3 (Revised edition of The Golden Cow: Materialism in the Twentieth-Century Church (1979))
- 1993 - Eros Redeemed: Breaking the Stranglehold of Sexual Sin, ISBN 978-0-8308-1659-0
- 1995 - The Pathway of Holiness: A Guide for Sinners, ISBN 978-0-8308-1980-5
- 1998 - God's Pursuing Love: The Relentless Tenderness of God, ISBN 978-0-8308-1944-7
