= The Great Brain =

American series of children's books by John D. Fitzgerald

- The Great Brain; More Adventures of the Great Brain; Me and My Little Brain; The Great Brain at the Academy; The Great Brain Reforms; The Return of the Great Brain; The Great Brain Does It Again; The Great Brain Is Back
- Author: John D. Fitzgerald
- Illustrator: Mercer Mayer
- Cover artist: Mercer Mayer
- Country: United States
- Language: English
- Genre: children's fiction, American history
- Publisher: Dial Press
- Published: 1967 – 1995

The Great Brain is a series of children's books by American author John Dennis Fitzgerald (1906–1988). Set in the small town of Adenville, Utah, between 1896 and 1898, the stories are loosely based on Fitzgerald's childhood experiences. Chronicled by the first-person voice of John Dennis Fitzgerald, the stories mainly center on the escapades of John's mischievous older brother, Tom Dennis Fitzgerald, a.k.a. "The Great Brain". The Great Brain was made into a movie released in 1978, with the main character played by Jimmy Osmond.

Mercer Mayer originally illustrated the books, except for 1995's The Great Brain Is Back (which was illustrated by Diane deGroat). Mayer did the original cover illustrations for the first seven books as well, but Carl Cassler re-did the cover illustrations for some of the reprints of the first seven books.

== Background ==
Although John D. Fitzgerald was born in Price, Utah, several references in the stories suggest Adenville is located in Utah's "Dixie" in the southwestern corner of the state. A small village called Adenville briefly existed near Cedar City, about which little is known.

The publisher's note in The Great Brain Is Back, published after the death of the author, recounts the story of the series' origin. Fitzgerald had written two novels for adults, Papa Married a Mormon and Mama's Boarding House, published in 1955 and 1958 and set in Adenville, Utah, at the end of the 19th century. A third book was requested by the editor, E. L. Doctorow, but he changed jobs before the manuscript was completed. Fitzgerald submitted the new novel, which focused on the children of Adenville, to Doctorow at The Dial Press but by then family stories were out of favor with adult readers. The new editor for children's books offered to publish the novel if it were cut in half and eliminated some passages aimed at adults. The result was The Great Brain.

== Series titles ==
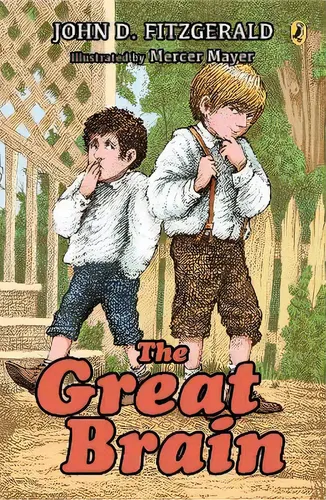
The cover of the first book in the series, aptly titled "The Great Brain". John and Tom are visible on the front.

Titles in order of chronological continuity are

1. The Great Brain (1967)
2. More Adventures of the Great Brain (1969)
3. Me and My Little Brain (1971)
4. The Great Brain at the Academy (1972)
5. The Great Brain Reforms (1973)
6. The Return of the Great Brain (1974)
7. The Great Brain Does It Again (1976)
8. The Great Brain Is Back (published in 1995 from loose notes after the author's death)

== Main characters ==
=== Fitzgerald family ===
The Fitzgerald family members include:

- John Dennis "J.D." Fitzgerald: The narrator of the series, and youngest of the three brothers.
- Thomas Dennis "Tom"/"T.D." Fitzgerald Jr.: The mischievous middle brother and swindler extraordinaire. His nickname is "The Great Brain", and his escapades form the basis for the series. Throughout the series, Tom demonstrates that he possesses incredible charisma, great intelligence, and a money-loving heart, but at times, he also demonstrates great humanity and generosity.
- Sweyn Dennis "S.D." Fitzgerald: The eldest brother; who is more skilled than J.D. at catching Tom in the act. He and Tom attend Catholic boarding school together. After graduating from that, Sweyn departs for Pennsylvania to live with relatives, where he attends a high school that was also his father's alma mater. He and Tom are two years apart, but Tom was allowed to skip the fifth grade. As a result, Sweyn and Tom attend the Catholic Academy together.
- Frankie Pennyworth: An unconscious boy rescued by Uncle Mark after a rock slide kills his brother and parents. When he first arrives, he has a mental block stemming from this trauma, in which he lashes out violently at the Fitzgeralds. John reflects that his name should be "Frankenstein Dollarworth", because, he says, Frankie is "a monster and a dollar's worth of trouble", and a battle of wills ensues when John is promised a large sum of money to try to cure Frankie's mental block, but only if Frankie does not need to be taken to a doctor in Salt Lake City. Frankie eventually becomes much better behaved and is adopted into the Fitzgerald family.
- Thomas Dennis Fitzgerald Sr. ("Papa" or "Fitz"): Patriarch of the family. Owner, editor, and publisher of the town paper, the Adenville Weekly Advocate. He is an Irish Catholic originally from the eastern United States who headed west to seek his fortune as a newspaper writer and publisher. He is one of Adenville's leading citizens, and highly respected amongst the residents as he is the only citizen of Adenville to hold a university diploma.
- Tena "Mamma" Fitzgerald: The matriarch of the family and homemaker, of Danish-Scandinavian ancestry. Her father was named Sweyn, which she named her first son in his honor.
- Aunt Bertha: A Methodist widow who lives with the Fitzgeralds, not actually a blood relative but still called "aunt" because she has been considered a part of their family. John explains that after Bertha's husband died, his parents took her in as she had no children, social network, or living relatives.
- Uncle Mark: The town marshal, who is the uncle of John and the one who discovered the landslide that killed the Pennyworth family and rescued an unconscious Frankie.
- Aunt Cathie: Mark's wife and Papa's sister, who considers adopting Frankie because she and Mark are childless on account of an earlier miscarriage. When Frankie says he wants to live with the Fitzgeralds instead, she accepts it considering that she will still be his aunt, and she and Mark go to an orphanage in Salt Lake City to adopt a daughter and son.

All the Fitzgerald men have the middle name of Dennis, a reminder of the "Fitzgerald Curse". The protagonist says that two centuries before he was born, Dennis Fitzgerald betrayed six of his cousins to English soldiers during a tax revolt in County Meath. His father decreed that all male Fitzgeralds should have the middle name of Dennis to be reminded of his son's treachery. It is a theme with the protagonist's parents, with the mother calling him and his brothers by the middle name of "Dennis" when she is cross with them and the father casually referring to them by their first two initials S.D., T.D., and J.D. The author's actual family is different: He had had an older sister, Belle Empey (née Fitzgerald). His two elder brothers were named William (rather than Sweyn) and Tom, and he had two younger brothers, Gerald and Charles. There was no record of his parents adopting children.

== Other characters ==
- Andy Anderson, a boy who loses his lower left leg to a tetanus infection after stepping on a rusty nail in an abandoned barn. Later he falls into severe depression over this and even considers suicide, until Tom convinces Andy he can still do chores and play.
- Parley Benson, son of a bounty hunter and the envy of most of the other boys. He possesses his own coonskin cap, a Bowie knife, and his own repeating air rifle. Tom wins Parley's air rifle in a bet about whether Tom can magnetize wood. After reading about boomerangs in an encyclopedia and seeing an illustration of one in a dictionary, Tom fashions a boomerang from a stick, and after throwing it, holds up a magnet to make it appear the magnet is bringing it back. Losing his air rifle earns Parley the "worst whipping of his life" from his father. Another story has Tom betting who is braver by having both boys break curfew and meet at the entrance to the forbidden Skeleton Cave.
- Dotty Blake, also known as "Britches Dotty", a "tomboy" whom Tom teaches to read and write, and who is given dresses and taught to act like a conventional girl by Tom's mother. Dotty beats up Sammy Leeds when he teases her.
- Danny Forester, son of the town's barber. Danny's left eye always seems half-shut, except when he gets excited. Tom swindles Danny out of a quality baseball glove by betting on hypnotism, which earns Danny a whipping from his father.
- Abie Glassman, a Jewish itinerant salesman who winds up settling in Adenville and opening a variety store. His business is shunned by the local community due to prejudicial notions that he is a miser hoarding gold, whereas Abie himself refuses to seek charitable aid from others due to his personal pride. Unable to support himself, he eventually dies of starvation.
- Jimmy Gruber, a diabetic boy who dies in childhood, after his father steals Frankie's rocking horse (named 'Bullet') as a present before Jimmy dies. When Frankie realizes the gravity of diabetes, he allows the Grubers to keep his expensive swing horse.
- Eddie Huddle, Frankie's best friend and son of the town blacksmith.
- Frank and Allan Jensen, who are children of Scandinavian immigrants. Due to being unfamiliar with Adenville, they get lost with their dog Lady, whereas John recalls that "before any native boy and girl in Adenville was allowed to go outside unsupervised, they had to swear on the Bible to stay away from Skeleton Cave". Their disappearance mobilizes the entire town into action to search the mammoth cave. Tom rescues the boys using his 'great brain'.
- Howard Kay, one of John's best friends, who has "a round face like a pumpkin". In the first book, John, wanting to get the mumps before Tom and Sweyn and expose them, sneaks into Howard's bedroom when he is quarantined with mumps and begs him to breathe on him, which Howard does (albeit reluctantly). Later, Howard was reluctant to ride on Tom's raft Explorer when the river had turned muddy, which was a sign of a looming flood. However, Tom pressured Howard by calling him "yellow bellied" if he backed out (and thus lose the five-cent admission). The subsequent flooding becomes a disastrous ride, nearly killing Howard. When John sees Uncle Mark and Parley Benson's father attempting to revive Howard by feeding him whiskey, this sends John into shock, and he faints.
- Vasillios "Basil" Kokovinis, a Greek boy who recently immigrated to America. His father, George Kokovinis, runs the Palace Cafe in Adenville and speaks good English having come to America five years before his wife and son. Upon his arrival in Adenville he has difficulty assimilating, until Tom takes the initiative to show Basil the ropes of being a bona fide American kid.
- Sammy Leeds, who is something of a bully. His father is bigoted and incites him to harass Basil, a newly arrived Greek immigrant, but is given his comeuppance when Tom encourages a lumberjack-style fight and Basil bests Sammy in wrestling, which the Greeks have excelled at.
- Jimmie Peterson, another of John's best friends, whose mother owns the local boarding house. Along with Danny Forester, Jimmie is swindled out of a baseball when Tom bets him, causing his mother to "give him a horsewhipping". He is almost killed along with Howard Kay and Tom on Tom's river raft the "Explorer" when a flood strikes. This incites anger in John as Tom put his friends' lives in danger for a fast buck.
- Polly Reagan, who becomes Tom's girlfriend when he turns 13. She has a "great brain" as well, having tied Tom in the town spelling bee. John resents her dating Tom, as she has taken all of Tom's attention to the detriment of playing with John and his friends.
- Seth Smith, a local Mormon boy close to Tom's age. He is friends with both Tom and John as he is too young to be included with the bigger kids. Seth's father owned a vacant lot, which he allowed the kids to use in exchange for keeping it free of weeds and litter. As there are no baseball diamonds or playgrounds in Adenville, this is the usual site where the kids play baseball, scrub football, or other games such as run sheep run. John was given a pig by Seth in exchange for a sought-after toy, only for John's mother to screech she will not have any pig breeding on the Fitzgerald land.
- Herbie Sties, a fat poet whom Tom sets out to reform out of his eating habits.
- Harold Vickers, son of the district attorney. Harold is 16, making him older than the other kids. He knows a great deal about the law and plans to become a lawyer when he is older. He is chosen by John to act as the judge at a trial for Tom set in the Fitzgerald barn. During the trial, Tom is charged with being a confidence man, swindler, and a crook by all of the kids in Adenville who were victims of Tom and his Great Brain. As this trial occurred soon after the disastrous river rafting, Tom is also accused of being negligent toward Jimmie Peterson and Howard Kay.
- Marie Vinson, daughter of the Vinsons, a prominent family in Adenville. Sweyn has a crush on Marie, much to John and Tom's chagrin. John refers to her as "that stuck-up Marie Vinson". Sweyn later returns home from high school wearing fancy Eastern clothing which he shows off to Marie, causing further mortification for John and Tom.

=== Religious demographics ===
Catholicism is central to the family's life and identity, a recurring theme in a town where Catholics are distinctly in the minority. The breakdown is said to be 2,000 Mormons, 500 or so Protestants, and only about 100 Catholics. All the non-Mormons or "Gentiles" attend a generalized community church, and the Fitzgeralds have to make do with the services of itinerant priests and of the local preacher, Reverend Holcomb, who preaches "strictly from the Bible" so he does not show favoritism to either Protestants or Catholics. It was said that once a year a Catholic priest would visit Adenville to hear confessions, baptize babies or do specifically Catholic rituals; other times a Protestant minister would do likewise, such as marry Protestants.

The Jewish population is almost nonexistent, consisting solely of an aging itinerant Jewish peddler named Abie Glassman who sets up a shop in Adenville with tragic results, as chronicled in the first book in the series, The Great Brain. Abie dies of starvation because his small shop cannot compete with the ZCMI store. Papa explains to the townspeople that it was because Abie was a Jew that no one recognized or helped him with his situation. With Abie's death, it can be inferred that the town no longer has any Jewish people living in it. It is also not known if Basil Kokovinis and his family are Greek Orthodox.

=== Education ===
- Papa, who had migrated from the northeastern United States, is the only person in town with a college education. Although many adults in Adenville lack a formal education, they are respectful of those who do, and the narrator remarks that his father was considered the smartest man in town as he was the only resident of Adenville to hold a university diploma.
- Papa also bemoans the fact that most boys in Adenville will be limited as careers and apprenticeships often have a prerequisite of an eighth grade education, which Adenville lacked in the beginning, and helped expand elementary education to solve this problem.
- Adenville contains a one-room schoolhouse with a single teacher who teaches the first through sixth grades.
- Parochial school: Papa sends Tom and Sweyn to a Catholic boarding academy in Salt Lake City that serves ten boys in the seventh grade and ten boys in the eighth grade. Much of this is discussed in The Great Brain at the Academy, where the Jesuit priests enforce strict discipline and have an academic curriculum more challenging than what Tom faced in Adenville.
- Later, as part of Thomas' initiative to expand lower education, a junior high known as the Adenville Academy is commissioned. Tom attends eighth grade there.
- In the series Sweyn attends high school in Boylestown, Pennsylvania, where Papa had earned his high school diploma. Sweyn lives with distant relatives of Papa's in Pennsylvania. One chapter touches upon the more stylish ways of the East, as shown by Sweyn's "dude" ways, as opposed to the West, which is slower to accept such ways due to being more concerned with settlement and hard work.

== Historical context ==
Fitzgerald's books describe many issues regarding society and life in the context of the late 19th century, between 1896 and 1898 in the southwestern United States. Among the topics covered are the following:

- Diabetes as a fatal disease (before the invention of artificial insulin)
- The banking system in the days before the Federal Reserve
- Mormonism, Catholicism and Protestantism
- The relationship between American settlers and Native Americans
- Transportation in the days before the Interstate Highway System. The citizens of Adenville often get where they want to go by walking or making use of horse and buckboard. Bicycling is uncommon as most citizens of Adenville are unable to afford this. For extra-long journeys, such as when Tom goes to boarding school in Salt Lake City or Sweyn goes to Pennsylvania for high school, the train is used.
- Sewage and sanitation. Outhouses (referred to as "backhouses" in Utah at that time, due to the term "outhouse" being used in that region to refer to a storage shed, workshed, or other small out-building behind the main house) are not only the norm, they are a mark of social status, with the richest people having backhouses with ornate woodwork. When Papa orders a flush toilet (called a "water closet") from Sears Roebuck and has a cesspool built, the whole town at first thinks it is an unwise placement of a backhouse indoors, until they see it work and then become fascinated.
- Child discipline. Most families gave their children "whippings". In The Great Brain Reforms, Parley Benson says that his pa gave him "the worst whipping" for letting Tom cheat him out of his repeating air rifle, as do Danny Forester says his father gave him the same treatment for losing his baseball glove to Tom in a bet, and Jimmie Peterson says his mother "gave him a horsewhipping" for losing his baseball to "that Fitzgerald kid". The better-educated, more progressive Fitzgeralds are a notable exception with their use of the silent treatment. This means that Mr. and Mrs. Fitzgerald will not talk to or acknowledge those who are punished. It often lasted from a range of one day to one week depending on the infraction, but could be longer. J.D. frequently describes the silent treatment as worse than a whipping because of the emotional impact of being ignored by his parents, and at times says that he wishes his parents would just give them a whipping and get it over with. One chapter dealt with Frankie being subject to the silent treatment and misconstruing it as being disinherited from the Fitzgeralds, causing him to run away from home. In later books as Tom and J.D. age, Papa admits the silent treatment is becoming outmoded, and now resorts to extra chores or revocation of allowances as punishments.
- In loco parentis. School is often shown as having little tolerance for child hijinks.
  - In The Great Brain, a teacher is shown who paddles boys who break school rules. Girls who break school rules are slapped on the palm with a ruler and made to stay after school to clean it. When Tom gets paddled for refusing to tattle on a friend, this sets events in motion where he swears to have the teacher terminated.
  - In The Great Brain at the Academy, the Jesuit priests assign boys who break school rules with jobs such as cleaning the latrine or peeling potatoes in the early morning hours. In addition, demerits are assigned, with the threat of expulsion to any boy who exceeds his demerit allowance in a given timeframe.
- Non-conformity and machismo. Tom's, John's, or other boys' fears that they will be seen as cowards, sissies, or welchers by the other boys of the town is a driving factor in more than a few of the stories.
- The boys often settle conflicts by fighting with detailed descriptions of punches thrown such as "Haymakers". John tells that he and his brothers stopped all teasing of them from the Mormons by being able to get proficient to "whip" any Mormon bullies in a fight. Tom tries teaching Basil Kokovinis fistfighting but when Basil tries wrestling moves, Tom realizes that is how Greeks fight and gets Basil to challenge bully Sammy Leeds in a "lumberjack style" fight.
- Leisure time amusements and activities in the days before radio and television.
- There is an anachronism in the series about Cracker Jack. In The Return of the Great Brain, Tom concocts a swindle using a "wheel of fortune", like a roulette wheel, where players win prizes depending on the number on which the wheel stops spinning. Half of the numbers win two boxes of Cracker Jack, with, as Tom says, "the usual prize in each box." However, prizes did not appear in Cracker Jack until 1912; the Great Brain series is set in the late 19th century.
- Another anachronism is that an Erector Set appears in the first two novels. However, Erector Sets were first sold in 1913.
- There is also an anachronism about telecommunications. Citizens of Adenville are often described as phoning each other. Yet in the 1890s, when the stories are set, the telephone was used mostly by businesses. Fewer than 3% of residential buildings in the United States had a telephone installed. It would have been highly unlikely for the poorer families in Adenville to afford a telephone, as it would not be until the prosperity of the 1950s that the vast majority of American homes could afford to subscribe to a phone service.
- There are some chapters in the series involving the paranormal, although the events can be explained naturally.
  - In More Adventures of the Great Brain, the people of Adenville, including Papa and Uncle Mark, believe that a prehistoric animal is on the loose due to "monster tracks" leading from Skeleton Cave to the river and back. In reality, Tom has created those tracks to scare Parley Benson away from the cave and win a bet.
  - Later in the same book, Tom, John, Sweyn, and several of their friends encounter a ghost in the abandoned mining town of Silverlode; the "ghost" is really the uncle of one of their friends dressed in a sheet, for the purpose of scaring them away from the very real physical dangers of that place.
  - In The Great Brain at the Academy, Tom and his friend Jerry win a bet by making it appear that Jerry can read minds, inspired by the boys being taken to a carnival by the priests and seeing a professional sideshow act of a magician. Tom later reveals how the real magician and his assistant pulled off the trick.
  - In The Great Brain Does It Again, Tom has Herbie Sties, the "greedy gut", take a "sacred oath" on the Bible to "stop eating ice cream and candy and more than one dessert a day", declaring that "if I break my sacred vow, my soul will belong to the Devil and I'll burn in everlasting Hell". When Herbie still does not lose even one pound, Tom and John investigate and secretly observe him consuming a bag-load of candy. Rather than denounce him on the spot, Tom has John dress up in a devil costume and knock on Herbie's window as he is getting ready for bed. Herbie believes for five days that a devil really has come to claim his soul, although the trick is eventually revealed.
- Crime. The author details various crimes that took place in Utah, but in one book explains that 20th Century Hollywood distorted the image of American West as a place of anarchy and lawlessness, which was not quite true due to the law enforcement of those days. In many cases of crime presented, Tom or John helped get to the bottom of it, often with their help of the town marshal, their Uncle Mark.
  - In More Adventures of the Great Brain, a bank robbery occurs where Mr. Whitlock is roused from his bed in the middle of the night, held at gunpoint and forced to go to his workplace and unsecure the safe.
  - In The Great Brain at the Academy, Tom accuses a man of cheating at cards, and backs up his proof by showing that the backs of the cards were marked with slightly differing decorations. Tom realized this as exactly the same fraud had occurred in Adenville years earlier, with Uncle Mark arresting the cheaters.
  - In Me and My Little Brain, John explains how Papa had been marked for death by Cal Roberts (along with the judge and D.A.) as he was the jury foreman at his trial. When Cal Roberts escapes from jail, he seeks his revenge...by holding Frankie at gunpoint, rendering all of Adenville paralyzed with fear.
  - In The Great Brain Reforms, three men representing "Alkali Products Incorporated" look to set up shop in Adenville, wowing the citizenry with the enticement of an economic boom. Tom suspects they are confidence men.
  - In The Return of the Great Brain, a cattle king is robbed on a train, then murdered shortly after he identifies the robber.
  - In The Great Brain is Back, Tom also helps prove the innocence of three Native Americans framed for theft, breaks up a dogfighting ring, and escapes kidnappers.
