= Margaret Hillert =

American writer

- Born: January 22, 1920; Saginaw, Michigan
- Died: October 11, 2014 (aged 94); Beverly Hills, Michigan
- Education: University of Michigan
- Occupation: Teacher
- Writing career
- Period: 1969-2014
- Genre: Children's literature

Margaret Hillert (January 22, 1920 – October 11, 2014) was an American author, poet and educator. Hillert, a lifelong resident of the state of Michigan, was known for her children's literature, having written over eighty books for beginning readers. She began writing poetry at a young age and published her first verses in 1961.

Hillert was born in Saginaw, Michigan, in 1920. She was best known for her Dear Dragon series, which pairs tales of a young boy and his pet dragon with instructional notes, word lists, and activities to promote reading skills. By using limited vocabulary and repeating words, her books are aimed at helping beginning readers gain skills and confidence. Hillert's work has been illustrated by Ed Young, Nan Brooks, Kelly Oechsli, Kinuko Y. Craft, and Dick Martin.

Hillert received a nursing degree from the University of Michigan and a teaching degree from Wayne State University. She taught First Grade at Whittier Elementary in the Royal Oak Public School District for 34 years. She died on October 11, 2014, at the age of 94.

== Awards ==
- 1991 Annual Award of the Children's Reading Round Table of Chicago
- 1993 The Women's National Book Association Michigan Bookwoman of the Year
- 1997 The Women of Wayne State “Headliner”
- David W Longe Prize

== Bibliography ==
- The Snow Baby (1969) (Illustrated by Liz Dauber)
- Come Play with Me (1975) (Illustrated by Kinuko Y. Craft, Published by Modern Curriculum Press)
- What Is It? (1977) (Illustrated by Kinuko Y. Craft, Published by Modern Curriculum Press)
- The Cookie House (1978) (Illustrated by Kinuko Y. Craft, Published by Modern Curriculum Press)
- The Funny Ride (1982) (Illustrated by Jözef Sumichrast, Published by Modern Curriculum Press)
