= Liesel Moak Skorpen =

American writer

- Born: 1 July 1935; Germany
- Died: 8 May 2013 (aged 77); Maine
- Occupation: Children's Book Writer
- Spouse: Erling Skorpen (7 children)
- Writing career
- Language: English
- Genre: Children's literature
- Notable works: Old Arthur, My Mother's Dog, Elizabeth, We Were Tired of Living In a House, Outside My Window, Charles

Liesel Moak Skorpen was a German-born children's author. Skorpen moved to the United States at a young age.

Her works include Old Arthur, We Were Tired of Living In a House, His Mother's Dog, Elizabeth and Outside My Window. Her illustrator for Old Arthur was Wallace Tripp.

Born in Germany, to Walter and Elizabeth Moak, she came to the US with her family, was raised and educated in Cleveland, Ohio. Liesel graduated from Wells College, Aurora, New York, and went on to Yale University where, while studying philosophy, she met a scholar named Erling Skorpen. When he completed his Ph.D. in philosophy, they wed and moved to Nevada to start their family. Together, Liesel and Erling built a family of seven children, two of whom they adopted, one from Korea and the other off an Indian reservation. After suffering the loss of a young son, Per Anders, they moved to Maine - See more at: http://obituaries.bangordailynews.com/obituaries/bdnmaine/obituary.aspx?pid=164727431#fbLoggedOut

== Selected bibliography ==
- Outside My Window (Coward-McCann, 1968) (illustrated by Mercer Mayer) ISBN 0-06-050774-8 (for the 2004 reprint)
- That Mean Man (Harper & Row, 1968) (illustrated by Emily McCully)
- We Were Tired of Living in a House (Coward-McCann, 1969 version illustrated by Doris Burn ISBN 0-698-30394-6, hardcover by Purple House Press in 2021 with Doris Burn's illustrations ISBN 9781948959292, and reprinted by Putnam in 1999 with illustrations by Joe Cepeda, ISBN 0-399-23016-5)
- Elizabeth (Harper & Row, 1970) (illustrated by Martha G. Alexander) ISBN 0-06-025708-3
- All the Lassies (Dial Press, 1970)(illustrated by Bruce M. Scott)
- Charles (Harper & Row, 1971) (illustrated by Martha G. Alexander) ISBN 0-06-025712-1
- Plenty For Three (Coward-McCann, 1971) (illustrated by Margot Tomes)
- Old Arthur (World's Work, 1973) (illustrated by Wallace Tripp) ISBN 0-437-74673-9
- Mandy's Grandmother (Dial Press, 1975) (illustrated by Martha G. Alexander) ISBN 0-8037-4962-7
- Michael (Harper & Row, 1975)(illustrated by Joan Sandin) ISBN 0-06-025719-9
- Bird (HarperCollins, 1976) (illustrated by Joan Sandin) ISBN 0-06-025693-1
- His Mother's Dog (Harper & Row, 1978) (illustrated by Mary Ellen Mullin) ISBN 0-06-025722-9

== Resources ==
Author biography
