= Cornish Colony Museum =

Art museum in Windsor, Vermont, US

Coordinates: 43.47756°N 72.38728°W

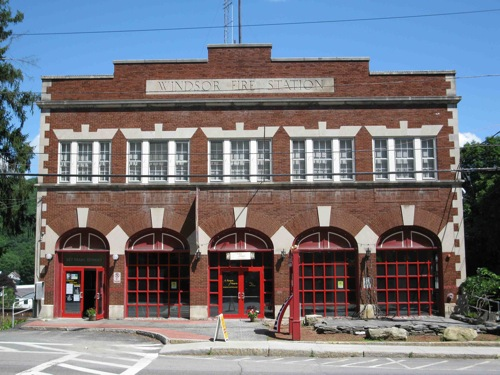
- Windsor fire house, in 2009, which was home to the Cornish Colony Museum from 2005
- Established: 1998
- Dissolved: 2010
- Location: Windsor, Vermont
- Type: Art Museum
- Curator: Nicole E. Ford
- Public transit access: Windsor-Mt. Ascutney (Amtrak station)

The Cornish Colony Museum was located in Windsor, Vermont. It was an art museum and educational institution, dedicated to displaying and teaching about the creative individuals who lived and worked in the Cornish Art Colony. The Cornish Colony Museum was operated by The Cornish Colony Museum of Windsor Vermont, a 501(c)3 non-profit educational corporation.

The Cornish Colony Museum was established in 1998, in Cornish, New Hampshire. The Museum originally occupied Mastlands, a 19th-century Cornish Colony house. In 2005, the Cornish Colony Museum relocated to Windsor, Vermont, located in the old Windsor firehouse. After a period of struggle, including some difficulties with its tax-exempt status, the museum moved briefly back to Cornish but ceased operations around 2010. The Windsor facility was closed and parts of the collection were later auctioned locally. Some papers related to the museum's founding and history are now housed at nearby Dartmouth College.

During part of its history, the museum routinely put on two exhibits a year, focusing on both the Cornish Art Colony artists, and on modern artists in the area. The Cornish Colony Museum also participated in the local "Meet the Artist" series, and hosted the late George Tooker, and children's illustrators Ilse Plume and John Stadler.

== See also ==
- Saint-Gaudens National Historic Site
