= Welleran Poltarnees =

Spiritual writer

Welleran Poltarnees is the pen name of Harold Darling, an author who is best known for having written numerous "blessing books" that employ turn of the 20th century artwork. This pen name is based on two of Lord Dunsany's most famous stories: The Sword of Welleran and Poltarnees, Beholder of Ocean.

== Selected bibliography ==
- The Baby Blessing
- The Kindness Book
- A Christmas Blessing (1996)
- A House Blessing (1994)
- A Blessing Of Healing And Strength
- A Book for My Father
- Sharing the Pleasures of Reading
- An Irish Blessing for the Home (2005)
- In Praise of Sailing (2004)
- A Book of Unicorns (1978) (which includes many illustrators including Mercer Mayer).
- The Happy Book
- A Blessing of Music
- A Birthday Blessing
- Optimism
- Weird and Wonderful: Discoveries from the Mysterious World of Forgotten Children's Books (2010)
- All Mirrors are Magic Mirrors: Reflections on Pictures Found in Children's Books (1972)
- Covering Christmas
- Big Book of Christmas
- Welcome Baby
- This Is My Wish For You
- Happiness
- By The Sea
- Hooray For Dogs
- Hooray For Babies
- I Love You
- The Golden Rule
- Invisible Art (The Art Brothers Welleran Poltanees, Richard Kehl and Cooper Edens)
- In Praise of Sailing
