= The Archives of Anthropos =

Series of children's fantasy novels by John White

The Archives of Anthropos is a Christian series of six fantasy novels for children written by the British author John White. Written in the tradition of C. S. Lewis' The Chronicles of Narnia, this series present a fantasy world of kings, sorcerers and goblins in an allegorical fashion.

== About the books ==
The books, in order of publication, are:

1. The Tower of Geburah (1978) ISBN 0-87784-560-3
2. The Iron Sceptre (1981) ISBN 0-87784-589-1
3. The Sword Bearer (1986) ISBN 0-87784-590-5
4. Gaal the Conqueror (1989) ISBN 0-87784-591-3
5. Quest for the King (1995) ISBN 0-87784-592-1
6. The Dark Lord's Demise (2001) ISBN 0-87784-521-2

The books, in chronological order, are:

1. The Sword Bearer (1986) ISBN 0-87784-590-5
2. Gaal the Conqueror (1989) ISBN 0-87784-591-3
3. The Tower of Geburah (1978) ISBN 0-87784-560-3
4. The Iron Sceptre (1981) ISBN 0-87784-589-1
5. Quest for the King (1995) ISBN 0-87784-592-1
6. The Dark Lord's Demise (2001) ISBN 0-87784-521-2

The Archives of Anthropos is written in the style of The Chronicles of Narnia, by C.S. Lewis, and use the same type of allegory: children from Earth are magically transported to another world where they are called by a Christ-figure to play key roles in that other world's history.

John White, the author, admitted having crafted the series after Lewis' own children's allegory. He writes in the appendix of his fifth book, Quest for the King:

"My own children ganged up on me and came with the request that since I wrote books for adults, I could write them for children too. (Of course their assumption was incorrect!) "We won't bug you any more," they said, "if only you'll write a book for us. But it has to be just like Narnia!" So, intrigued, I decided I'd have a crack at it ... I wrote, and then read them my opening chapter of what eventually turned into The Tower of Geburah."

Responding to the criticism that he was merely copying Lewis' work, he writes "People said (quite accurately), 'He's just trying to copy Lewis.' I was. This was what my children wanted. That is, I was trying to copy Lewis at first, but I soon ceased to. Copying gets you nowhere. You have to make any genre your own for it to work."

== Reading order ==
As John White explains in the appendix of Quest for the King, he wrote The Tower of Geburah and The Iron Sceptre first, but felt compelled to write the prequel novels to explain parts of the prior history of Anthropos, such as "Where did the tower of Geburah come from?" In regards to the published vs. chronological order of the books, he writes:

"So if you wish to read them in the least confusing arrangement, follow the [chronological] sequence"
