= Marianna Mayer =

American writer

Marianna Mayer (born in New York City on November 8, 1945) is a well-known children’s book writer and artist from Roxbury, Connecticut. Her early education was in the field of the visual arts. After one year of college, she became a student painter at the Art Students League in New York City. Her first book was published when she was nineteen years old. She is known for her retellings of folk and fairy tales. She is the author of Baba Yaga and Vasilisa the Brave and her written versions of Pegasus, and The Twelve Dancing Princesses. She was the first wife of the famous illustrator, Mercer Mayer.

== Bibliography ==
- a retelling of the Beauty and the Beast story, Illustrated by Mercer Mayer (Four Winds Press, 1978)
- The Unicorn Alphabet, Illustrated by Michael Hague (Dial Books, 1989)
- a a retelling of the Brothers Grimm story, The Twelve Dancing Princesses, Illustrated by Kinuko Y. Craft (Morrow Junior Books, 1989)
- Marcel the Pastry Chef, Illustrated by Gerald McDermott (Bantam Books, 1991)
- Baba Yaga and Vasilisa the Brave, Illustrated by Kinuko Y. Craft (HarperCollins, 1994)
- a retelling of the Pegasus legend, Illustrated by Kinuko Y. Craft (HarperCollins, 1998)
- a retelling of The Adventures of Tom Thumb, Illustrated by Kinuko Y. Craft (Chronicle Books, 2001)
