= Mercer Mayer =

American children's author and illustrator

- Born: December 30, 1943 (age 82); Little Rock, Arkansas, U.S.
- Occupations: Artist; illustrator; writer
- Writing career
- Period: 1967–present
- Genre: Children's literature
- Website: www.littlecritter.com

Mercer Mayer (born December 30, 1943) is an American children's author and illustrator. He has published over 300 books, using a wide range of illustrative styles. Mayer is best known for his Little Critter and Little Monster series of books.

== Life and career ==
Mayer was born in Little Rock, Arkansas. His father was in the United States Navy, so his family moved many times during his childhood before settling in Honolulu, Hawaii. There, Mayer graduated from high school in 1961. While attending school at the Honolulu Museum of Art, Mayer decided to enter the field of children's book illustration. To that end, he created a portfolio of sketches and peddled them wherever he could. Though his professors feared the young artist would never be good enough to make a living as an illustrator, Mayer was not dissuaded.

Mayer moved from Hawaii to New York City in 1964, pursuing further instruction at the Art Students League of New York, where he met an artist named Marianna who became his first wife. He also met an art director who told Mayer that his portfolio was so bad that he needed to throw it away. Though offended, Mayer did. During his spare time from his job at an advertising agency, the artist created a completely new portfolio. These new sketches persuaded editors at Dial Press and Harper & Row to give him some illustration work.

Mayer published his first book, A Boy, a Dog, and a Frog, at Dial Press in 1967. It was notable for being a completely wordless picture book—one that tells its story entirely through the use of pictures. Mayer was one of the first illustrators to be credited with using this format. Five more books in this series followed. He also produced If I Had a Gorilla about the advantages of ape ownership.

The book There's a Nightmare in My Closet drew on Mayer's childhood fears of monsters in his room at night. Critics initially compared the book unfavorably to Maurice Sendak's Where the Wild Things Are (ironically, Sendak himself found no such comparison and enjoyed Nightmare; having been a friend of Mayer's), but children and their parents loved the story and it became very popular, with at least 14 editions being released since its publication in 1968.

Mayer joined Golden Publishing, the creators of Little Golden Books, in 1976. Through them he has sold his "Little Critter" and "Little Monster" series, which are popular with beginning readers.

In 1978, Mayer divorced Marianna. The following year, he married his second wife, Jo. The couple had three children: two sons, Len and Arden as well as a daughter named Jessie. Mayer and his third wife Gina, had two sons of their own (Ben and Zebulon). He currently lives in Roxbury, Connecticut. Gina collaborated with him on many of his books since the early 1990s. Gina died on November 27, 2017, at age 51 due to illness.

In addition to writing and illustrating his own books, Mayer has collaborated on many projects with other children's authors. He has illustrated books for John Bellairs, Jane Yolen, Jan Wahl, Jay Williams, and John D. Fitzgerald, among others.

== Notable adaptations ==
The book There's a Nightmare in My Closet was featured on Reading Rainbow. An animated special was made, which faithfully followed the book and added two small sections where the boy is playing outdoors at sunset and reflects how the monster will soon come, as well as arranging his planes and toy soldiers around the closet to form a "defense force". The inner monologue of the boy was voiced by Michael J. Fox.

The titular nightmare monster also starred in a music video for Alice Cooper's "Welcome to my Nightmare".

== Selected bibliography ==
=== Well-known series ===
- Little Critter
- Little Monster
- Boy, Dog, Frog

== General sources ==
- St. James Guide to Children's Writers, 5th edition, St. James Press (Detroit), 1999.
- https://www.legacy.com/obituaries/name/gina-mayer-obituary?pid=187368986
