= John D. Fitzgerald =

American writer

- Born: February 3, 1906; Price, Utah, U.S.
- Died: May 21, 1988 (aged 82); Titusville, Florida, U.S.
- Occupation: Novelist
- Spouse: Joan
- Writing career
- Period: 1955–1976
- Genre: Children's literature
- Notable works: The Great Brain series Papa Married a Mormon and Mama's Boarding House

John Dennis Fitzgerald (February 3, 1906 – May 21, 1988) was an American author, most notable for The Great Brain series of children's books.

== Biography ==
Fitzgerald was born in Price, Utah, the son of an Irish Catholic father and a Scandinavian Latter-day Saint mother. He had two older brothers, Thomas (the basis for the character known as the Great Brain) and William; two younger brothers, Charles and Gerald; and an older sister, Isabelle (known as "Belle").

He left Utah in 1925 at the age of 18. He played in a jazz band and got a job in the newspaper business. He spent four years as a foreign correspondent and began to write short story fiction when he returned to the United States. Journalism work became increasingly difficult to find so he took a job as a purchasing agent at a steel company for economic stability while he continued to write. He found enough success that he quit the purchasing job to write full-time, having had over three hundred short stories published before 1950. Eventually, though, the market for short stories shrank so much that he took a job in a bank.

Fitzgerald wrote his first novel with his sister, but she was not credited because the book was written in the first person. Titled Papa Married a Mormon, it was published in 1955 as a tribute to his mother, who had died. It was serialized in McCall's magazine and reprinted in several foreign languages, including German and Chinese. On the strength of this success, he quit his job and moved to a mountain cabin in Colorado to attempt a career at writing novels. Other books about late nineteenth and early twentieth century Utah and written for an adult audience followed but he ended up moving to Denver and took a hiatus from creative writing for a short while. He published The Professional Story Writer and His Art in 1963 and one evening when friends dropped by, they all traded reminiscences of childhood. Fitzgerald's tales of his brother's exploits created such mirth that his wife suggested he publish them. Thus began his most well-known books, The Great Brain series, in which his characters are loosely based on people from his own family and community, including himself.

Fitzgerald published many stories in magazines and he co-wrote two textbooks about creative writing. Children's books are seen as the more important of his writings.

== Bibliography ==
=== The Great Brain series ===
- The Great Brain (Dial Press, 1967)
- More Adventures of the Great Brain (Dial Press, 1969)
- Me and My Little Brain (Dial Press, 1971)
- The Great Brain at the Academy (Dial Press, 1972)
- The Great Brain Reforms (Dial Press, 1973)
- The Return of the Great Brain (Dial Press, 1974)
- The Great Brain Does It Again (Dial Press, 1976)
- The Great Brain Is Back (Dial Press, 1995) — published from loose notes after the author's death

=== Other books ===
- Papa Married a Mormon (Prentice-Hall, 1955) — unofficially co-authored with Fitzgerald's sister Belle Fitzgerald Empey
- Mamma's Boarding House (W.H. Allen, 1958) — sequel to Papa Married a Mormon
- Uncle Will and the Fitzgerald Curse (Bobbs-Merrill Company, 1961)
- (with Robert C. Meredith) The Professional Story Writer and His Art (Crowell, 1963)
- (with Robert C. Meredith) Structuring Your Novel: From Basic Idea to Finished Manuscript (HarperCollins Publishers, 1972)
- Brave Buffalo Fighter (Bethlehem Books, 1973)
- Private Eye (T. Nelson, 1974)
