= List of Orphan Black episodes =

The logo

Orphan Black is a Canadian science fiction television series that premiered on March 30, 2013, in Canada on Space. The series was created by Graeme Manson and John Fawcett, and stars Tatiana Maslany as several clones. The rest of the starring cast includes Dylan Bruce, Jordan Gavaris, Kevin Hanchard, Michael Mando, Maria Doyle Kennedy, Evelyne Brochu, Ari Millen, Kristian Bruun and Josh Vokey.

On June 16, 2016, the series was renewed for a fifth and final ten-episode season, which premiered on June 10, 2017, and concluded on August 12, 2017. During the course of the series, 50 episodes of Orphan Black aired over five seasons.

== Series overview ==
Orphan Black seasons
Season	Episodes	Originally released	
Season	Episodes	First released	Last released
1	10	March 30, 2013	June 1, 2013
2	10	April 19, 2014	June 21, 2014
3	10	April 18, 2015	June 20, 2015
4	10	April 14, 2016	June 16, 2016
5	10	June 10, 2017	August 12, 2017

== Episodes ==
=== Season 1 (2013) ===
All titles of the first season are terms from On the Origin of Species by Charles Darwin.

Orphan Black, season 1 episodes
No. overall	No. in season	Title	Directed by	Written by	Original release date	Prod. code	U.S. viewers (millions)
1	1	"Natural Selection"	John Fawcett	Graeme Manson	March 30, 2013	224086-1	0.684
British punk con artist Sarah Manning, living in Toronto, sees a woman who could be her twin, Beth Childs, kill herself by jumping in front of a train. Retrieving Beth's bag and finding that she was wealthy, Sarah decides to take her home and clean out her bank account. This would enable Sarah to collect her daughter Kira from her foster mother, Mrs. S. Sarah asks her foster brother Felix to identify Beth's body as Sarah's to buy time for her scheme and to throw her drug-dealer boyfriend Vic off her trail. Sarah withdraws $75,000 from Beth's account but discovers, to her dismay, that Beth was a police detective suspended for shooting one Maggie Chen. Beth's police partner Art intercepts Sarah, who poses as Beth, and takes her to a hearing for Chen's death. Sarah ingests soap and vomits to stall the proceedings and try to escape. However, Art breaks into her car, taking the $75,000. After Sarah's funeral, with only Felix knowing she is still alive, Sarah is approached by Katja Obinger, another lookalike, from Germany. Katja is killed by a sniper, but Sarah manages to escape.
2	2	"Instinct"	John Fawcett	Graeme Manson	April 6, 2013	224086-2	0.409
Sarah is contacted by a woman who tells her to dispose of Katja's body and retrieve her briefcase. Art tells Sarah that he has the $75,000, and won't return it until she has testified at the inquest into the shooting and cleared her name. Art doesn't want it to be revealed that he put a cellphone in the dead Maggie Chen's hand so it would look like Beth had shot her in self-defence. Sarah poses as Katja to get the briefcase from the hotel. The briefcase contains evidence of more lookalikes, including soccer mom Alison Hendrix. Sarah gets Alison to set up a meeting, where she meets yet another lookalike: evolutionary developmental biology student Cosima Niehaus, the woman she spoke with on the phone.
3	3	"Variation Under Nature"	David Frazee	Graeme Manson	April 13, 2013	224086-3	0.350
Alison tells Sarah that they are clones. In the briefcase, Sarah and Felix find that three of the clones Katja had found were already dead. Sarah goes to the police station to ask Art for the money back, only to be reinstated as a police detective and drafted to cover Katja's murder. Worried that her own fingerprints might be identical to Katja's, she deletes them from the record. Art and Sarah track down the killer, who shoots at them. Sarah saves Art's life, and then gives chase, only to find that the killer is another clone, a Ukrainian named Helena. Sarah stabs Helena, but Helena escapes. Art returns the money to Sarah, who learns that Beth had received it from Alison to help with her investigation into their situation. Sarah thus returns the money to Alison.
4	4	"Effects of External Conditions"	Grant Harvey	Karen Walton	April 20, 2013	224086-4	0.361
Sarah and Art continue looking for the killer, while Sarah tries to cover up that both killer and victim are her sister clones. The police believe that the killer is a fundamentalist Christian, while Cosima deduces that the group Helena is affiliated with believes the clones are abominations and must be killed. Helena keeps a close eye on Sarah and the case, putting Sarah's cover in jeopardy. Mrs. S allows her to visit Kira, but because Sarah is busy on the case, Felix asks Alison to impersonate Sarah - otherwise Mrs. S would never allow her to see Kira again. Alison is taken aback when Kira instantly knows she is not Sarah. Helena lures Sarah to Maggie Chen's apartment, where it is revealed that Maggie worked for the same group as Helena: Beth had killed Maggie to protect the clones. Sarah allows Helena to escape before Art arrives, and later quits the police force. Helena collapses and is picked up by a man wearing the same symbol as her and Maggie.
5	5	"Conditions of Existence"	TJ Scott	Alex Levine	April 27, 2013	224086-5	0.327
After waking up from a supposed dream where she was experimented on, Sarah spits out an electrode from her mouth. The clones soon learn that they have monitors, people in their lives whose purpose it is to observe them. Sarah suspects Beth's boyfriend Paul Dierden of being her monitor, while Alison suspects her husband Donnie. Meanwhile, Vic comes across a chance meeting with Alison, and discovers that Sarah faked her death. In response, Sarah pays Vic $20,000 to leave her alone: $15,000 to pay for his debts incurred by her theft and $5,000 to pay for his "pain and suffering" due to the loss of his finger over the unpaid debts. Sarah and Felix spy on Paul's work place, but unknown to them, Paul follows Sarah walking Kira home from school. Paul also discovers that "Beth's" scar is gone. After calling Sarah to meet him at their home, Paul holds Sarah at gunpoint and demands an explanation, prompting Sarah to tell him that Beth is dead. When Sarah asks Paul why he is monitoring her, Paul admits that he does not know.
6	6	"Variations Under Domestication"	John Fawcett	Will Pascoe	May 4, 2013	224086-6	0.340
Alison purchases a nanny cam and finds that Donnie snuck out during the middle of the night. Paranoid, Alison ties him up, while also handling a neighborhood house party. Sarah impersonates Alison to question Donnie, who says he was covering up letters from a girl he dated when he and Alison were broken up. Paul follows Sarah and ultimately learns of their nature as clones. He also helps Sarah get rid of Vic when he continues to be a nuisance to her. Felix suspects Alison's neighbor, Aynsley Norris, of being the actual monitor. Meanwhile, Cosima is approached by Delphine Cormier, a fellow student. Cosima suspects Delphine of being her monitor, but goes with her to a lecture given by Dr. Aldous Leekie of the Dyad Institute, a proponent of "neolution" (using technology to advance human evolution). Later, it is revealed that Delphine and Leekie are lovers.
7	7	"Parts Developed in an Unusual Manner"	Brett Sullivan	Tony Elliott	May 11, 2013	224086-7	0.280
Paul is questioned by his handler, Olivier Duval, regarding Beth's behavior. Though Paul tries to cover up the fact that Sarah is posing as Beth, the neolutionists discover the truth after checking the test results from experimenting on her. The neolutionists also believe Sarah to be the killer of the other clones. Meanwhile, Helena is nursed back to health by her trainer, Tomas, who orders her to kill Sarah. Although she appears reluctant to do so, she implores Sarah to reveal the names of other clones. Later, Sarah calls Helena to help free Paul who is imprisoned in Olivier's nightclub, called "Neolution." Paul and Sarah hide out in Felix's loft to avoid the neolutionists. The police continue to investigate Katja's body and are perplexed to find a DNA match between the body and the killer, and find the record of recently deceased Sarah Manning, who looks like Beth.
8	8	"Entangled Bank"	Ken Girotti	Karen Walton	May 18, 2013	224086-8	0.367
Paul blackmails Olivier into telling Leekie that there was only one clone who attacked, Helena. Leekie tells Paul he has a new job for him, then arranges for Olivier to be killed. Delphine tells Leekie that Cosima made a pass at her, and he presses her to find out how many clones Cosima has had contact with. Cosima and Delphine sleep together. Delphine then searches the apartment, finding the clones' names and informing Leekie, but neglecting to mention Kira. Art goes to the morgue to check "Sarah's" body, and this leads him to Felix. He questions Felix and realizes it was he who made the anonymous call with information about Beth. Alison takes revenge on Aynsley, whom she suspects of being her monitor, by having sex with her husband, Chad. Aynsley finds out and confronts her, and they fight. Sarah introduces Alison to Mrs. S and tells her about the clones. While they are talking, Kira opens the front door to Helena and follows her out. Kira speaks kindly to Helena, who lets her go, but, hearing her mother call, Kira runs into the street and is hit by a car.
9	9	"Unconscious Selection"	TJ Scott	Alex Levine	May 25, 2013	224086-9	0.253
Kira is taken to the hospital, where it appears that she has accelerated healing. Alison returns home to find that Aynsley is holding an intervention regarding her past behavior and addictions. Under Felix's encouragement, Alison turns the tables by scrutinizing Aynsley. Art finds CCTV footage of the train station where Beth committed suicide, and discovers that Sarah has been impersonating her. Cosima learns that Delphine leaked the names of the clones to Leekie and confronts her. Delphine reveals that she knows about Kira's existence but decided not to tell Leekie, knowing her life could come into danger should he know (Kira is the only known biological child of a clone). Sarah meets with Leekie, who wants her to save Helena from the Proletheans, the extremists who indoctrinated her. Tomas punished Helena for defying orders, but she is later rescued by Sarah and turns against Tomas. Sarah returns to Mrs. S, who has reached her contacts in England, and meets Amelia, Sarah's birth mother. Amelia reveals that she gave her away and fled after realizing she was a surrogate mother to Dyad scientists. Furthermore, Amelia gave birth to twins; Helena is Sarah's twin sister.
10	10	"Endless Forms Most Beautiful"	John Fawcett	Graeme Manson	June 1, 2013	224086-10	0.376
As Amelia meets Helena, police arrive to arrest Sarah, while Helena escapes. Sarah is about to tell Art the whole story, but gets spirited away by Daniel Rosen, a Dyad operative. Sarah is brought to Rachel Duncan, a clone high in the Dyad organization, who offers Sarah and Kira protection. Leekie also offers the same to Alison and Cosima, as Cosima begins to display symptoms of a respiratory illness that Katja had. Alison confronts Aynsley a final time, ending with Alison watching Aynsley accidentally choke to death on her own scarf. Amelia tells a woman pretending to be Sarah that Mrs. S is not who she says she is, but this "Sarah" is actually Helena, who stabs Amelia, blaming her for turning her over to the Proletheans. When Sarah finds her body, she shoots Helena. Alison signs Leekie's document, while Sarah goes to meet Rachel, planning to sign as well. However on the way, Cosima and Delphine decipher a code inside the clone genome: "this organism and derivative genetic material is restricted intellectual property." By phone, Cosima warns Sarah, who leaves Dyad without signing the contract. Donnie meets with Leekie, thus revealing he is Alison's monitor. Sarah returns to discover Mrs. S's home ransacked and Kira and Mrs. S gone.

=== Season 2 (2014) ===
All titles of the second season are quotes from the works of Sir Francis Bacon.

Orphan Black, season 2 episodes
No. overall	No. in season	Title	Directed by	Written by	Original release date	Prod. code	U.S. viewers (millions)
11	1	"Nature Under Constraint and Vexed"	John Fawcett	Graeme Manson	April 19, 2014	224086-11	0.620
Sarah runs to a nearby diner, where she is quickly confronted by two armed men, one of whom is Mark Rollins, who attempt to bring her in. They kill the diner's owner (who shoots one of the men in the process), but Sarah manages to escape. She finds Felix and gets Alison to give them access to an unregistered gun so she can get Rachel to bring her to Kira and Mrs. S, as she believes Dyad has kidnapped them. Sarah impersonates Cosima at Dyad to steal Leekie's passkey and confronts Rachel, who reveals she does not have Kira. Alison, who tries to kick her addiction to pills, is chosen as the lead in the community musical, replacing the now-dead Aynsley. Leekie wants Cosima to start working for Dyad. With nowhere else to go for help, Sarah goes to Art's home with the intention of telling him the whole story. Art, who is investigating the diner shooting, identifies the perpetrators as Proletheans; they are likely the ones who have Kira. Meanwhile, a wounded Helena stumbles into a hospital.
12	2	"Governed by Sound Reason and True Religion"	John Fawcett	Karen Walton & Graeme Manson	April 26, 2014	240278	0.718
Kira calls Sarah, and Art traces it to a motel. Sarah gets kidnapped, while Art has a run-in with Daniel that later results in his suspension. Sarah is taken to Mrs. S, who reveals she ran away with Kira and made it look like a kidnapping. They go to a country house owned by two compatriots. Later that night, Kira admits she no longer trusts Mrs. S, so she and Sarah attempt to escape. Mrs. S learns that her compatriots plan to sell Kira to the Proletheans; she kills the two to allow Kira and Sarah to escape. Meanwhile, during Aynsley's funeral, Alison begins to suspect that Donnie was her monitor all along, so she and Felix set a trap for him that confirms her suspicions. Alison returns to drinking from the guilt of Aynsley's death. Cosima and Delphine set up a new lab at the Dyad institute to learn more about the former's condition. Art's partner Angela Deangelis learns of Helena's existence, but when she visits the hospital, Mark has taken Helena away to a ranch owned by Henrik Johanssen, the Prolethean leader who plans to use Helena to create a baby. Henrik has Tomas killed for objecting to his plan.
13	3	"Mingling Its Own Nature With It"	TJ Scott	Alex Levine	May 3, 2014	224086-13	0.450
Sarah, Felix, and Kira arrive at a house belonging to Cal Morrison, who is revealed to be one of Sarah's marks and Kira's father. He allows the three to stay for a little while. Felix returns to the city to support Alison in her play. Angela tries, and fails, to befriend Alison to learn more about the lookalikes. Before the play's debut, Alison drinks too much, then falls off the stage during her performance. Cosima and Delphine investigate the death of Jennifer Fitzsimmons, a clone who died from the same respiratory illness as Katja and Cosima. They autopsy the body and believe that the illness is possibly linked to the clones' infertility. Art begins to surveil Henrik's ranch, as Henrik marries Helena, then takes her away to a room. Daniel, who spent the episode looking for Sarah, tracks her down and kidnaps her, while also murdering a local police officer. Cal finds them, and he crashes his truck into their car.
14	4	"Governed as It Were by Chance"	David Frazee	Russ Cochrane	May 10, 2014	224086-12	0.484
Cal and Sarah hide the car and the assumed-dead Daniel. Sarah leaves Kira with Cal and returns to Mrs. S's home with Felix, where they find news clippings of Susan and Ethan Duncan, the founders of Leda and the cloning project and Rachel's adoptive parents. Mrs. S, meanwhile, reunites with Carlton Redding, who helped smuggle her and Sarah out of London. Helena escapes from the ranch after Henrik's daughter Gracie tries to kill her and remembers that Henrik took something from her. Alison wakes up in rehab. She is told by Donnie that she will not see her children unless she stays a week. Sarah sneaks into Rachel's apartment, only to be captured by the very much alive Daniel. As he tortures her, Helena arrives and kills Daniel. At the ranch it is revealed that Henrik took Helena's egg cells for in vitro fertilization.
15	5	"Ipsa Scientia Potestas Est"	Helen Shaver	Tony Elliott	May 17, 2014	224086-14	0.510
Rachel has Paul replace Daniel as her monitor and lover, while also withholding a stem cell treatment from Cosima. Despite this, Leekie plans to treat Cosima anyway. He later confides in Cosima that the original clone genome was lost in a lab fire; the genome would have provided the cure for the illness. Meanwhile, Paul, under Rachel's orders, storms in on Felix and gets his fingerprints on Daniel's gun to frame him for the police officer's murder. He gives Sarah until morning to produce Kira. Sarah places Helena in Art's custody so she can learn more about the Proletheans. Helena escapes, but provides Art and Sarah with clues to the location of Maggie Chen's locker. There, the two find clues relating to Ethan Duncan's location and realize that Helena intends to assassinate Rachel. Sarah finds Helena and talks her out of killing Rachel, and under Leekie's promise that he will drop the charges against Felix, the two set off to find Ethan.
16	6	"To Hound Nature in Her Wanderings"	Brett Sullivan	Chris Roberts	May 24, 2014	224086-15	0.541
Sarah and Helena arrive at a church where Ethan has been. Sarah visits the archives to learn more about Ethan, and with the aid of Art and Felix investigating the files from Maggie's locker, learns that he changed his name to Andrew Peckham. Helena finds a bar and makes a connection with local man Jesse, but she is later arrested for fighting with some drunks. Mark and Gracie later invite Helena back to Henrik's ranch to allow herself to be inseminated with her own fertilized eggs. Scott Smith, a fellow student of Cosima's, joins her and Delphine at Dyad, and learns that the stem cells Cosima was given belong to Kira. At rehab, Alison befriends Vic, who is later revealed to be an informant for Angela to get dirt on Alison. Sarah arrives at a house only to find Mrs. S, whose old contacts have protected Ethan for years. Sarah meets Ethan, who informs Sarah that he started the clone project before it was hijacked by Leekie and the neolutionists in 1977. He also fears Leekie, who was behind Susan's death.
17	7	"Knowledge of Causes, and Secret Motion of Things"	Ken Girotti	Aubrey Nealon	May 31, 2014	224086-16	0.497
Alison reveals to Vic that she let Aynsley die, then learns he is Angela's informant. Vic promises not to tell Angela if he sees Sarah. Sarah sees Vic at rehab, but Felix has drugged him, and he collapses. As Alison and Felix hide Vic, Sarah is mistaken for Alison and is forced to attend "Family Day," ultimately resulting in Donnie finding out about the clones and that Alison was telling the truth about being probed. Mrs. S and Paul arrange a meeting between Rachel and Ethan. After Ethan tells Rachel of her mother's fate, Rachel fires Leekie, and also implies to him that Dyad will be after him. Cosima is angry with Delphine for using stem cells from a tooth Kira lost during the car accident. Kira willingly decides to give Cosima another tooth for analysis. Donnie goes to confront Leekie for lying to him and accidentally shoots him in the head.
18	8	"Variable and Full of Perturbation"	John Fawcett	Karen Walton	June 7, 2014	224086-17	0.576
Art receives a call on Beth's old cell phone from Tony, a transgender clone who promised his dying friend, Sammy, that he would deliver a message to Beth. Tony stays at Felix's apartment until Sarah arrives to tell him that Beth is dead and reveals his origin. Tony delivers the message: "Tell Beth to keep the faith. Paul's like me. He's on it. He's a ghost." Alison learns Donnie intends to leave, prompting her to admit to being responsible for Aynsley's death. Donnie confesses to killing Leekie, and the two begin work to cover up the murder. Sarah and Mrs. S agree to transport Ethan Duncan to Dyad to start work on a synthetic therapy that may cure Cosima of her illness. Ethan reveals to Rachel that the clones were always intended to be infertile, and views Sarah as a "failure." Before leaving, he hands Kira the book The Island of Doctor Moreau, which houses all of his secrets in its margins. As Ethan and Cosima begin to work, Cosima collapses and goes into violent convulsions.
19	9	"Things Which Have Never Yet Been Done"	TJ Scott	Alex Levine	June 14, 2014	224086-18	0.613
Rachel appoints Delphine as Leekie's replacement for director of clone research. Learning that Kira's bone marrow might save Cosima, Sarah asks Kira to donate some, and Kira agrees. As Alison and Donnie work to bury Leekie in their garage, Vic returns to either blackmail her or discover new dirt for Angela. Suspecting that Angela's operation is not official, a newly assertive Donnie confronts Angela to chase them both away. Burying Leekie causes the couple to have a newfound passion, and they have sex. Helena and Gracie are implanted with Helena's eggs fertilized with Henrik's sperm. Helena finds out that Henrik intends to impregnate several other women with Helena's eggs. Helena helps Gracie and Mark run away while she kills Henrik and burns the farm down. Rachel, disillusioned at the prospect of not being able to have children, tricks Delphine into distracting Sarah while Rachel, posing as Sarah, abducts Kira.
20	10	"By Means Which Have Never Yet Been Tried"	John Fawcett	Graeme Manson	June 21, 2014	224086-19	0.538
Sarah surrenders to Dyad hoping to secure Kira's safety but is imprisoned. Rachel deliberately separates Delphine from Cosima by sending her to Germany. Ethan commits suicide to prevent Rachel from getting the code key. Kira steals a cell phone and contacts Cal, who goes to Mrs. S. They meet Paul, who is revealed to be in the military, and Marion Bowles, a Dyad executive. Scott and Cosima devise a plan to break Sarah free by making a makeshift weapon out of a fire extinguisher. Rachel sabotages Cosima's treatment by destroying the bone marrow, at which point Sarah uses the weapon, shooting a pencil into Rachel's eye. They all escape Dyad with the aid of Marion, who invites Sarah to meet her the next day. The next morning, Helena leaves, but is kidnapped by the military as arranged by Paul and Mrs. S. Kira gives Cosima Ethan's book with the sequences needed to save her life. Sarah visits Marion's home, and meets Charlotte, a clone of Kira's age and the only survivor of the second Leda batch. Marion explains that the military controlled a male clone project, Castor, with the clones looking like Mark.

=== Season 3 (2015) ===
All titles of the third season are quotes from the farewell address of Dwight Eisenhower. The premiere episode debuted on all five of AMC Networks' cable channels–BBC America, AMC, IFC, SundanceTV and WE tv–and received 1.27 million cumulative viewers across all five airings. Likewise, in Canada, the season premiere was simulcast on Space, CTV, Bravo, and MTV Canada.

Orphan Black, season 3 episodes
No. overall	No. in season	Title	Directed by	Written by	Original release date	Prod. code	U.S. viewers (millions)
21	1	"The Weight of This Combination"	David Frazee	Graeme Manson	April 18, 2015	224086-20	0.535
While Cosima's condition is improving, Delphine takes over Rachel's duties at Dyad, but the two break up. Delphine shows Sarah a video of two Castor clones, Rudy and Seth, attempting to abduct Krystal Goderitch, a Leda clone; Rudy is the imprisoned clone in Marion's house. After Rudy tells Sarah to "count your sisters", she learns Helena is missing and further resents Mrs. S for taking part in her disappearance even though she did so to help free Sarah and Kira from Dyad. Later Topside official Ferdinand arrives to talk to Rachel. Sarah impersonates her to avoid him knowing of her condition. Sarah learns that Ferdinand took part in "Helsinki", assassinating six self aware Leda clones in Finland, and he is under Rachel's orders to kill those in the Clone Club, starting with Alison. Delphine manages to learn about Ferdinand's purpose through torturing the now brain-damaged Rachel and manages to have him call off the assassinations. Meanwhile, Alison decides to run for school trustee against Marci Coates to oppose Marci's plans on rezoning the school district. Seth breaks Rudy free.
22	2	"Transitory Sacrifices of Crisis"	John Fawcett	Aubrey Nealon	April 25, 2015	224086-21	0.420
Sarah learns from Art that Rudy and Seth assaulted a woman in a hotel and took a lock of her hair. Seth is revealed to be suffering from a degenerative disorder. Helena is being held in a controlled military zone and subjected to testing where her captor Doctor Virginia Coady learns of her pregnancy. Rudy and Seth search for the original clone tissue in Felix's apartment. Rudy holds Kira hostage to gather information from Sarah; he does not believe Sarah's claims that Ethan Duncan did not leave original tissue samples with her. When Seth suffers a seizure outside while holding a knife to Cal, Rudy retreats and ends Seth's suffering by killing him. Realizing Kira is not safe with Sarah, Cal moves with Kira to Iceland while Sarah goes to look for Helena. Meanwhile, Cosima and Scott work with Dr. Nealon to understand Cosima's recovery, despite her and Scott's lack of trust for him. Alison and Donnie hatch a plan to turn the tide for her campaign by buying Ramon's drugs.
23	3	"Formalized, Complex, and Costly"	John Fawcett	Chris Roberts	May 2, 2015	224086-22	0.443
Art and Sarah work together to find a lead on Mark's location. Mark reveals to Gracie that he was sent by the military to infiltrate the Proletheans to find the original Castor DNA, which he believes Henrik entrusted to farmer Willard Finch for safe keeping. It is believed the DNA would be used to cure the Castor defect. Gracie recovers the box from Finch, but there is no DNA inside. Henrik's wife Bonnie tracks Gracie down to bring her back to the Proletheans. Sarah learns that Art is devoted to helping the Clone Club because he was in love with Beth. Cosima extracts Seth's brain and learns that like the Leda clones, the Castor clones are also suffering from a defect, albeit a neurological one, as well as determining that both sets of clones are biological siblings. Alison gains support for her campaign after selling the other mothers drugs hidden in bars of soap. Nealon treats Rachel's brain damage. Rudy confronts Finch but he dies from a heart attack during the torture. Sarah's arrival is soon followed by Bonnie, who shoots Mark.
24	4	"Newer Elements of Our Defence"	Chris Grismer	Russ Cochrane	May 9, 2015	224086-23	0.406
Sarah evades Bonnie and escapes with a wounded Mark. They arrive at an empty house where Sarah treats Mark's wounds. When Mark loses consciousness, Sarah recovers his motel key and finds Henrik's box, where she learns he worked with Ethan, and Henrik used the DNA to produce his own clone, Abel. When Mark finds her, he reveals the baby died shortly after birth, so they go to a grave yard to recover his body. Gracie's pregnancy ends with a miscarriage, and Bonnie, believing it to be punishment from God for marrying Mark, shuns her. Alison finds herself wanted by Ramon's boss, who is revealed to be her ex-boyfriend Jason Kellerman. The two decide to work together to distribute the drugs. Felix sets up a dating profile for Cosima to get over Delphine. Helena manages to escape from her cell and comes across a sick Castor clone, Parsons, that Coady is experimenting on. Helena kills him out of mercy before she is captured again. Sarah recovers Abel's remains, but it is intercepted by Rudy. Sarah attempts to flee, but Mark and Rudy capture her.
25	5	"Scarred by Many Past Frustrations"	David Frazee	Alex Levine	May 16, 2015	224086-24	0.460
Sarah is taken to the Castor base, much to Paul's dismay; Mark would have let her go, but since deranged Rudy was there, this was the best option. Sarah also has a strained reunion with Helena, who blames her for her capture; Coady had been feeding her lies about the capture, indicating Sarah, not Siobhan was responsible. Although Coady assures Paul no harm would come to Sarah, she still collects a lot of her blood to gather stem cells. Cosima goes on a blind date with Shay Davydov (Ksenia Solo), a holistic healer, and quickly begins a physical relationship. However, the date is monitored. Gracie, with nowhere to go, approaches Art, who takes her to Felix and Mrs. S. There, Gracie comes out of her shell and parties with the others, getting drunk before suffering a seizure, displaying bloodshot eyes. Sarah and Helena plot an escape, and Helena successfully exits her cell, but she decides to leave Sarah behind. As she is about to leave the compound, she begins to have second thoughts. Art also meets with the woman assaulted by Rudy and Seth, learning that she has the same symptoms as Gracie.
26	6	"Certain Agony of the Battlefield"	Helen Shaver	Aubrey Nealon	May 23, 2015	224086-25	0.393
Paul discovers the hair samples from the women the Castor clones assaulted, and that Sarah is suffering from negative side effects after being given some of Rudy's blood. Alison makes significant money from the drug deals and plots with Jason to expand further by buying her mother's beauty shop Bubbles to be used as a front. In an attempt to find Sarah, Felix has Scott bring him to Rachel to learn her location but Rachel does not know. However, Scott realizes that Rachel was painting symbols from Ethan's notes. Cosima examines Gracie and learns that the Castors' defect is sexually transmitted and renders women infertile. Paul has Coady arrested and takes charge of the base until reinforcements arrive. However, he later realizes that even his superior David Benchman is conspiring against him, as Coady is planning to weaponize the defect. Rudy is recalled from searching for Helena to help Coady. Paul helps Sarah, who has recovered, to escape, but he decides to stay behind. He kills a Castor clone, Miller, but is stabbed in the process. Paul urges Coady to stop. When she responds by shooting him, a dying Paul releases a grenade, destroying Abel's remains. Helena, who returned, finds Sarah on the way out.
27	7	"Community of Dreadful Fear and Hate"	Ken Girotti	Sherry White	May 30, 2015	224086-26	0.372
After escaping the Castor camp, Sarah and Helena meet Mrs. S. at a local bar, where Helena wants to kill her for selling her out. After heated discussion, Mrs. S promises that Sarah, Kira, Felix, herself and all the other "sisters" will be the family Helena never had. Delphine asks Cosima for a urine sample, but Cosima double crosses her by asking Alison to give hers. Meanwhile, Alison's mother Connie refuses to sell her store. When Donnie and Jason try to pay their supplier Pouchie, Donnie accidentally gives Alison's signatures that support her campaign instead. Pouchie holds Donnie until the money arrives. Alison and Felix attend a campaign event at a local school where Felix arranges for Cosima to pose as Alison for the photography shoot. Alison pays Pouchie, and she has Donnie released. She then takes over from Cosima-as-Alison and gives an impassioned campaign speech, gaining more support over Marci. Connie decides to sign the papers to Bubbles. Alison turns down Cosima's attempt to substitute a urine sample, suspecting her illness has resurfaced when she begins coughing again. Later, Cosima experiences bleeding from her groin during a bath. Scott spends time with Rachel in order to decode Ethan's notes.
28	8	"Ruthless in Purpose, and Insidious in Method"	Aaron Morton	Graeme Manson & Chris Roberts	June 6, 2015	224086-27	0.522
Delphine meets the Leda clone Krystal and afterward informs Nealon that Krystal has no idea about clones. David Benchman informs Coady that they have infiltrated Dyad. Rachel will only decode the symbols in Ethan's The Island of Doctor Moreau book if Sarah and Scott help her escape to Taiwan with a new life using Krystal's identity. Sarah and Felix go to Krystal's place of work, a beauty salon, where Felix poses as a customer to steal her wallet. Felix discovers that although Krystal is not a self-aware clone, she began investigating her attempted kidnapping by Rudy and Seth. Rudy shows up at Scott's apartment and steals Ethan's book by threatening Scott's cat. Delphine suspects that Rachel or Shay have been spying for Castor people. Delphine fires Scott for not reporting the book earlier; Scott previously made a copy of the book. Cosima refuses to accept more treatment using Kira's stem cells, and she resigns from Dyad. Rachel begins translating but Nealon busts in, taking her and the book before smuggling Rachel away for prosthetic eye surgery using Krystal's identity. The Neolutionists have held the real Krystal in a medically-induced coma in Rachel's place at Dyad, to fool Delphine and the other clones. From what they saw translated, Mrs. S, Felix, and Sarah believe the Castor original is in London.
29	9	"Insolvent Phantom of Tomorrow"	Vincenzo Natali	Russ Cochrane	June 13, 2015	224086-28	0.401
Felix, Sarah and Mrs. S arrive in London to meet with Terrance who believes Ethan's coded numbers relate to a prisoner identity. As Terrance investigates, Ferdinand has him beaten to death. Cosima comes to believe that Shay is a spy working for Castor. When Delphine interrogates Shay, she intends to stage her death as a suicide. However, Cosima calls her off because Gracie admits that she betrayed them to help Mark. Pouchie demands that Donnie return the drugs, keeping the canister with Helena's eggs as collateral. Donnie and Helena return the drugs, but Helena kills Pouchie and his crew after they threaten Alison's children, and takes all of the money. Mrs. S previously stated that to stop all the danger, the only way is to kill the original source; but when the dying Terrance whispers what he found out, Mrs. S insists that she, Sarah and Felix return home and stop investigating. Sarah takes Terrance's phone, leading to the address of Kendall Mallone, Siobhan's mother. Kendall reveals that she submitted to Ethan's medical tests while in prison, and she is the original to both Leda and Castor as she is a chimera carrying two genetic lines; Kendall absorbed a male twin in her mother's womb.
30	10	"History Yet to Be Written"	John Fawcett	Graeme Manson	June 20, 2015	224086-29	0.428
Kendall returns with the others to Canada, with Art's assistance. Cosima later obtains biological material from Kendall. Doctor Coady has Rudy follow Alison, who lures Rudy to her garage, where Helena waits to kill him. Delphine and Sarah make a deal with Ferdinand to stop Coady. Sarah and Felix find Gracie and Mark; Mark assists them by posing as Rudy and giving Coady a location for Kendall, where Ferdinand captures Coady. Kendall reveals that she arranged for Sarah to arrive in S's care. Delphine realizes that Krystal has taken Rachel's place in Dyad's ward, and has Nealon arrested. Nealon reveals that Neolution runs both Leda and Castor, and that Rachel is in their custody. Delphine is forced to kill Nealon when he attacks her and tries to place a worm into her mouth. Upon learning of Nealon's Neolutionist agenda, Ferdinand, who despises Neolution, defects. The Clone Club and their families, along with Art and Scott, gather at Bubbles to celebrate their victory and Alison's election win, and to remember Beth. Delphine reconciles with Cosima, before being shot by an unseen figure. Rachel, with a new prosthetic eye, is being held in a house where she reunites with Charlotte and another woman, her presumed-dead adoptive mother Susan. In Iceland, Kendall goes into hiding and Sarah reunites with Kira.

=== Season 4 (2016) ===
All season 4 titles are quotes from the works of Donna Haraway.

Orphan Black, season 4 episodes
No. overall	No. in season	Title	Directed by	Written by	Original release date	Prod. code	U.S. viewers (millions)
31	1	"The Collapse of Nature"	John Fawcett	Graeme Manson	April 14, 2016	224086-30	0.229
M.K., a Leda clone wearing a sheep mask, witnesses two paramedics burying a man in the forest. She phones Beth Childs, who visits the scene the next day with Art, discovering the dead man's cheek chopped out. M.K. tells Beth that the dead man is linked to neolution. Beth visits Club Neolution, where body-mod Trina informs her of the self-directed nature of Neolution. Olivier reports Beth's visit to Aldous Leekie, and they consider whether Paul has lost control of her. Beth visits Leekie hoping to gain more information where Evie Cho recognizes her as a Leda clone. Beth installs borrowed surveillance equipment in her apartment. Trina contacts Beth concerned for her boyfriend. Beth finds the paramedics killing Trina's boyfriend, under Detective Duko's supervision and the guise of operating on his cheek. Beth inadvertently attracts their attention, and mistakenly shoots a bystander—later revealed to be Prolethean Maggie Chen. Beth calls Art, who helps cover for her. Detective Duko is positioned to help Beth through the investigation, unaware that she knows his real role. In the present, Sarah's Icelandic retreat is interrupted by a phone call from Art and M.K., who warn Sarah to flee as Neolution has found them.
32	2	"Transgressive Border Crossing"	John Fawcett	Russ Cochrane	April 21, 2016	224086-31	0.271
Sarah, Kira, Mrs. S, and Kendall flee Iceland. Helena learns she is having twins which causes Alison to yearn for her own children. Cosima is upset about Delphine's disappearance. Sarah determines that to learn about Neolution they must contact M.K. Knowing Beth was in contact with her, Sarah and Art investigate Beth's final days. They discover Beth was spying on Paul and had contact with Trina. Sarah and Felix go to the Neolution club, where they argue when Felix reveals he has been searching for his birth family. Sarah encounters Dizzy, who mistakes her for M.K. and shows her a video of an operation on a Neolution follower which kills him when the cheek implanted bot is ruptured. She tries to meet M.K., who reveals she feared 'it' would kill Sarah like it killed Beth. In flashback, Beth tells M.K. to "watch the others". Neolution paramedics attack Sarah, believing her to be M.K., but retreat when they discover it is actually Sarah. Sarah later discovers she has a bot implanted in her cheek. Kendall reveals to Scott that she has leukemia.
33	3	"The Stigmata of Progress"	Ken Girotti	Aubrey Nealon	April 28, 2016	224086-32	0.242
Ira, a Castor clone raised outside of the military by Susan Duncan, examines Rachel's new eye. Susan, Charlotte's new guardian, returns to the Island after unsuccessfully attempting to track down Kendall. Kira senses things and she is not happy with people keeping the truth from her. Cosima examines Sarah's bot but they are unsure of its purpose. Alison and Donnie begin to dig up Dr. Leekie's body in the hope that he possesses an implanted bot (as most high level Neolutionists do) for Cosima to study. As they begin to excavate, the police arrive to investigate the murder of Pouchie's drug ring, who were in possession of Vote Alison Hendrix campaign material, forcing Helena to play Alison during the detectives' interrogation. Sarah meets Felix's biological half-sister Adele and immediately doubts her intentions, causing Sarah and Felix to split on bad terms. Alison and Donnie inform Cosima that they killed Leekie and have his bot for her to examine. Art sees on Beth's surveillance video that Detective Duko visited her. Art finds information on the man whose bot exploded (on the video that Sarah saw at the club last episode). With Art's intel, Sarah visits a dental clinic where one of the employees recognizes her as Beth, who previously investigated there. She promises to remove the bot but seemingly pierces it instead, telling Sarah not to move as the toxins will kill her, and claiming that she has contacted her superiors, calling her lucky to be implanted with the technology. Ferdinand arrives instead, killing the dentist and freeing Sarah as she would already be dead had the bot actually been pierced. Rachel learns for the first time that Charlotte was cloned from herself. Rachel gets word to Ferdinand that Susan is alive. Susan, after telling Rachel that she does not love her, apologizes for her detachment and informs her that their purpose is for the greater good; to control human evolution and create a more perfect human being.
34	4	"From Instinct to Rational Control"	Peter Stebbings	Alex Levine	May 5, 2016	224086-33	0.218
Ferdinand, having saved Sarah, convinces them to decrypt files that Rachel sent him, as the files could lead to Susan Duncan who can probably deal with Sarah's bot. After Leekie's head containing the bot is delivered to Cosima, she and Scott begin investigating its true purpose. Trina, mistaking Alison for Beth, confronts Alison in a diner for investigating Lifespring Fertility Clinic, having been a carrier and trusting Beth in confidence. Posing as a gay couple, Felix and Donnie visit the clinic looking for information on Brightborn conception technologies. With Alison becoming more emotional about her (in)fertility issues, Helena buries her expired nitrogen eggs and leaves the Hendrixes behind. Sarah goes to M.K. for help decrypting Rachel's files. Realizing that Rachel and Sarah are collaborating with Ferdinand, M.K. lures him to Beth's house and tricks him into sitting on a pressure bomb. M.K. confronts him for the Helsinki event, which wiped out multiple clones and their friends and family, including M.K.'s best friend Niki, another Leda clone. The letters "M.K." were from clone number 3MK29A whose name was Veera Suominen, a clone that escaped the purge and now plans revenge on those responsible for the deaths. Sarah turns up to stop M.K./Veera, needing Ferdinand alive to help remove the bot in her cheek, which Cosima has discovered is performing gene editing to change her DNA. M.K. leaves with Ferdinand's money. Mrs. S defuses the bomb and Sarah declares that her score with Ferdinand is even. Elsewhere, knowing Charlotte is sick, Rachel makes the case that Charlotte should be left to die, refusing to intervene with her illness as the data would be invaluable. Susan agrees but reveals that she knows of Rachel's contact with Ferdinand. Cosima and Scott watch the Brightborn Fertility information video, presented by Evie Cho.
35	5	"Human Raw Material"	David Wellington	Kate Melville	May 12, 2016	224086-34	0.223
Sarah discovers that Brightborn owns GeneConnexion, the company that united Felix and Adele, so she sends their DNA to Scott to verify the familial match. Cosima goes undercover at Brightborn with Donnie, posing as a surrogate mother. Evie Cho is present, and the two fear that the high-level Neo would recognize a clone. At the same time, Krystal Goderitch continues investigating and poses as a prospective parent. Evie spots Krystal and informs Susan (who is visiting with Ira), but they mistake her for Sarah. While Cosima searches for Brightborn's lab, Donnie is shocked when he sees Krystal. Elsewhere in the building, Susan meets Cosima who is unaware of Susan's identity, and discuss Brightborn's policies and techniques. Cosima steals her swipe card that gives access to secure areas. Later, Adele turns up to a family meal and after arguing with Felix, Sarah discovers that the two are indeed related and apologizes. Detective Duko warns Art to drop his interest in Beth. Alison confesses to Sarah that Helena took off. Donnie presents himself to Krystal as a Brightborn spa employee, and she shares her misguided suspicion that Dyad and Brightborn are putting stem cells in cosmetics. Roxie locks Krystal in a room, thinking her to be Cosima. Susan directs Krystal's release because she is harmless, then Krystal spots Ira in the building and begins to scream. Cosima comes across a pregnancy where the baby is delivered with severe deformities. When Susan walks in, Cosima realizes who she is and the two dispute the moralities of experimenting on human lives. Susan offers Cosima the opportunity to collaborate with them and to create a cure using the original's genome. Kira tells Sarah that she feels each of the Leda sisters.
36	6	"The Scandal of Altruism"	Grant Harvey	Chris Roberts	May 19, 2016	224086-35	0.248
In a flashback, Beth wearing a blonde wig enters a private Brightborn event with Susan and Evie in attendance. When Susan leaves the room, Beth follows and holds a gun to her head, threatening to kill her. Susan argues that as the leader of Neolution, she is also protecting them and that she genuinely loves the clones. Beth leaves without shooting. In the present, Krystal turns up at the police station seeking protection from the guys who look like Castors. Art spots Krystal and arranges for her to meet Felix. Krystal reveals that she saw Delphine get shot. Evie confirms that Sarah's bot is attempting to isolate the gene making them sick by activating specific genes in Sarah. Running out of time, Sarah and Cosima take up Susan's request to share Kendall's genome, without consulting Mrs. S. Refusing to share the Castor pathogen when sharing Kendall's genome, Cosima suggests isolating the Leda cell line, using Kendall's cancer cells which have multiplied from a single Leda gene and thus have not impacted the Castor gene line. After Evie and Cosima remove Sarah's bot, she returns home to find Kendall's cigarettes in a pool of blood, and that Kendall cannot be contacted. Sarah destroys the samples and they take Susan hostage, believing she orchestrated Kendall's abduction; in turn, Cosima is taken hostage at Brightborn. Sarah believes Ira is behind the attack after denying him a cure but he is found unconscious after attempting suicide by drug overdose. Brightborn wipes Scott and Cosima's research and they realize that Evie is behind the attack, wanting Leda destroyed. Duko prepares to burn Kendall to death and destroy Leda's hope for a cure, as instructed by Evie. Evie grants Cosima permission to say goodbye before Kendall is murdered. Evie tells Cosima that Delphine was shot dead, before instructing her to tell Susan that the original is dead and to tell Sarah that it is over or Beth died for nothing. A flashback reveals that Evie misled Beth to kill Susan and, Beth having not followed through, Evie threatened Beth by saying that she knows too much and should use the gun on herself to save her sisters. Beth, after physically attacking Evie, is shown walking to the train platform after saying goodbye to M.K.
37	7	"The Antisocialism of Sex"	David Frazee	Nikolijne Troubetzkoy and Graeme Manson	May 26, 2016	224086-36	0.258
With their hope of a cure gone, Sarah and Cosima both attempt to come to terms with their input in the deal that led to Kendall's death. Alison pushes forward with Gemma's birthday party to maintain a sense of normalcy. Susan returns to the Island and informs Rachel of the creator of Neolutionism, Dr. P.T. Westmorland, noting that he built the facilities they live in over a century ago. Mrs. S disowns Sarah who begins to spin off the rails, drinking, partying and taking drugs. Sarah's story starts to parallel Beth's and she begins to hallucinate her. Art confirms that it was Detective Duko who killed Kendall and proceeds to attack him. Duko tells him that Neolution is after Art next. Evie has pending approval for her gene therapy technology and plans to dismantle Leda for their assets, cutting loose naive clones and terminating the self-aware clones while refusing to allow Rachel to take a position of importance within Neolution. Police interrupt the Hendrix slumber party and arrest Donnie on suspicion of narcotics trafficking. Duko then shows up and ominously says that he and Alison will be staying in touch. Sarah finds herself at the train station where Beth killed herself, conversing with her one last time. Cosima decides to experiment on herself by inserting Sarah's bot (which she stole from Brightborn) in her own cheek, as it could cure her, or her death could help the Leda clones learn about the disease. Felix talks Cosima out of it, informing her that Krystal saw Delphine get carried away alive after being shot. Felix then arrives at the train station, where Sarah contemplates jumping. He and Beth's apparition talk Sarah out of it, and she steps down and returns to Mrs. S's home. M.K. hacks Kira's computer. Kira calls her the girl in the shadows. Rachel sees a swan in her prosthetic eye.
38	8	"The Redesign of Natural Objects"	Aaron Morton	Peter Mohan	June 2, 2016	224086-37	0.245
Jailed for drug trafficking, Donnie meets a Neolution plant who threatens him. Alison visits him in jail, with Felix and Adele (a lawyer), who is surprised to see Sarah's 'twin sister'. Donnie reveals the Neolution threat and believes he won't survive his prison sentence. M.K. contacts Sarah and meets Cosima, explaining that she has traced Susan and Rachel's location, and reveals Evie's plan to dissemble Leda and her threat to wipe out the sisters. M.K. helps Sarah and Cosima to contact Susan on the Island to scientifically team up. Susan agrees, but Cosima forces Rachel and Ira out, refusing to trust them. After sending Sarah more information on Duko, M.K. begins coughing up blood due to the same disease killing the Leda clones. Mrs. S, furious over the death of her mother, takes out her sniper rifle to kill Duko. However, Alison arrives to confront him. Duko gives Alison an ultimatum: turn over Sarah's location or allow Donnie to die; Alison and Donnie are simply caught in the crossfire and the Neolutionists only want Sarah. After being given the day to think about it, a fraught Alison is visited by Felix. Alison seemingly makes the deal, giving Duko Sarah's location when Donnie is threatened with death. After Duko calls off the attack on Donnie and reveals Evie's plan to implant bots into millions under the guise of gene therapy, he walks into a trap. Mrs. S shoots him dead. Cosima comes up with a possible cure: fertilizing Leda eggs with Castor sperm from Ira to create an embryonic stem cell. Sarah hesitantly agrees, and with Sarah's eggs Cosima flies to the Island where Susan waits to work with her. Rachel's swan visions become more vivid, and a man appears too. Rachel wants to get back to work and restore Susan's place at the head of Neolution.
39	9	"The Mitigation of Competition"	David Frazee	Alex Levine	June 9, 2016	224086-38	0.291
Cosima and Susan collaborate on the Island. In the city, Sarah and Rachel begrudgingly team up to bring down Evie; Rachel suggests that they find two carriers, Tabitha and Kendra, who fled BrightBorn with video evidence of deformed newborns being euthanized. Tabitha is found dead in a pregnancy shelter, supposedly having committed suicide. Sarah sees Trina leave the shelter. Still believing Sarah to be Beth, Trina tells her that Tabitha's death was not a suicide. Trina asks Sarah to find Kendra in Tisdale, and an investigator overhears and tells Evie. Helena, who has been living in the woods, takes a phone call from Sarah. Donnie is released from prison and Adele begins to become suspicious about the family, furthered when Helena returns from hibernation and arrives at Felix's apartment. After a standoff, Adele agrees not to ask questions and leaves on bad terms with Felix. Sarah and Art track down Kendra and eventually convince her to go with them, just as Neolution arrives. Art holds them off while Kendra receives a call from Rachel threatening to give one of Kendra's children (currently staying with relatives) to Neolution if she does not go with Ira, who shows up to drive Kendra to the city. Evie Cho is preparing for a press conference regarding the government approval of her bot technology, which uses germline editing to alter DNA. Sarah confronts Ira who reveals that Rachel is with Evie. Rachel, claiming to want to make a deal with Evie and become head of Neolution in exchange for the video evidence, records Evie admitting that Brightborn euthanizes deformed newborns. During the press conference the new recording is pushed to every reporter's phone, causing them to mob Evie as Rachel looks on. Neolution paramedic Frank captures Alison and Donnie for information on Duko's disappearance. Frank ties them up and attempts to insert a fatal bot in Alison's cheek but Helena bursts in and kills Frank. Rachel's hallucinations intensify and she sees a tribe-like village, a young brunette girl, the killing of a swan, and a bearded man staring at her. Delphine is shown to be alive.
40	10	"From Dancing Mice to Psychopaths"	John Fawcett	Graeme Manson	June 16, 2016	224086-39	0.325
What happened to Delphine is revealed. Helena keeps Donnie and Alison safe. After Cosima finds a cure for the Leda clones, Susan cuts off her network access and later locks her in a room. Susan tells Rachel that they can continue the cloning program. Krystal sees Dr. Van Lier's (doctor and mentor to Evie) familiar face on a news clip about Brightborn, and offers information on Delphine's shooting in exchange for information and insight into the investigation. Krystal meets one of her clones for the first time, but doubts their resemblance. Sarah publicly poses as Krystal to get information from Van Lier on the Island's location and Rachel's plan, which involves taking control of Neolution, merging now-deceased-Evie's bots with cloning technology. Rachel does not want her mother Susan back on top. Rachel casts aside Ira, then Sarah convinces him to help prevent Rachel from harming Susan. Sarah flies to the Island to save Cosima, whom Charlotte has released saying that Susan wants them to escape by boat before angry Rachel finds them. Susan tells Rachel that in contrast to her sisters, Rachel's existence is a regret. Sarah arrives to find the bleeding Susan, who says Rachel took the stem cells and the Leda cure. Rachel attacks Sarah. Susan tells Rachel who created the prosthetic eye that has given her visions. The man from Rachel's visions leads Cosima and Charlotte to Delphine at a camp on the Island. As Cosima takes a turn for the worse, she tells Delphine that she "finished (our) homework", ie. the cure. Sarah lies bleeding on the beach and learns that Kira and Mrs. S are being held captive by Ferdinand, who has defected to Neolution under Rachel's authority. In the final moments, Rachel gleefully prepares to meet P.T. Westmorland who founded Neolutionism centuries ago, still alive today.

=== Season 5 (2017) ===
All season 5 titles are quotes from the poem "Protest" by Ella Wheeler Wilcox.

Orphan Black, season 5 episodes
No. overall	No. in season	Title	Directed by	Written by	Original release date	Prod. code	U.S. viewers (millions)
41	1	"The Few Who Dare"	John Fawcett	Graeme Manson	June 10, 2017	224086-40	0.278
Sarah finds Cosima in Revival, a civilized village on the Island. She is told Revival chooses their residents for the betterment of science. Cosima decides to stay there to access the advanced medical science at Westmorland's disposal after having seen Delphine's bullet wound has healed almost completely. Rachel becomes the spokesperson for P.T. Westmorland. Felix and Ira try to contact M.K. Siobhan fends off Ferdinand with a corkscrew. Art gets a new partner, Detective Engers, who is actually working for Dyad. Engers captures Alison in an attempt to apprehend Helena. Donnie and Helena elude Engers but Helena is stabbed in the stomach. Sarah tries to escape the island but is captured by one of Rachel's men with a dart.
42	2	"Clutch of Greed"	John Fawcett	Jeremy Boxen	June 17, 2017	224086-41	0.225
With Sarah and her family taken captive by Neolution, Rachel offers to let them live in peace as long as Kira submits to occasional testing. Refusing to allow this, Sarah, Felix and Siobhan conspire with M.K. to retrieve Kira from school before Rachel and Ferdinand can. Their plan is successful, but M.K. stays behind at Felix's loft to distract Ferdinand, who brutally kills her, for which Rachel ends their relationship and fires him. Sensing M.K.'s death, Kira forces Sarah to take her back to Rachel for testing so she can understand herself. Meanwhile Donnie takes Helena to the hospital, where her unborn babies heal rapidly. Suspicious that the doctor treating her may be a Neolutionist, Helena attacks her and flees. On the island, Cosima meets P.T. Westmorland. Delphine meets with Siobhan in secret.
43	3	"Beneath Her Heart"	David Wellington	Alex Levine	June 24, 2017	224086-42	0.208
Struggling with her feelings of uselessness to her sisters, Alison is sidelined in her neighbourhood's carnival celebrations, and her guilt over Aynsley's death resurfaces when Chad shows up at the carnival, leading her to relapse and get high with help from Ramone. Meanwhile Art is forced to assist his partner in searching Alison's house and planting evidence tying her to Pouchie's murder; instead his partner discovers the corpses of Leekie and Rudy under the garage. Donnie collapses while performing a highland dance onstage, after accidentally consuming a drink Alison spiked with tranquilizers. Alison berates the watching crowd for their hypocrisy in criticising her and her husband, reminding them that most of them bought drugs from her. She then confronts Rachel and demands she call off the police, pointing out that an investigation into Leekie's murder will draw unwanted attention to Neolution and get Rachel into trouble with Westmorland. Alison later decides to leave for a while, with Donnie's blessing.
44	4	"Let the Children & the Childbearers Toil"	David Wellington	Greg Nelson	July 1, 2017	224086-43	0.277
Frustrated Kira won't tell her what she does with Rachel, an irritated Sarah is taken by Siobhan to con their way into a mental hospital to see a patient who has information on Westmorland. Visiting Helena in a convent along the way, Helena tells Sarah that Kira's connection to the Ledas is special and Kira will have to eventually deal with what the clones do. The patient is Dr. Virginia Coady, drugged and hidden there by Susan Duncan to keep her away from Westmorland. Before the cloning work began, Coady and Westmorland pushed a boy with a perfect genome too far despite Susan's protests. Adele returns having learned about the clones from Siobhan and recruits Felix to go to Switzerland with her to track Neolution companies. Susan awakes on the island, Westmorland needs her scientific mind for Kira's data but Rachel is still in charge of the project. Cosima follows Mud around, eventually seeing the perfect boy is now a feral adult living in the woods.
45	5	"Ease for Idle Millionaires"	Helen Shaver	Jenn Engels	July 8, 2017	224086-44	0.271
Delphine returns to the island but refuses to tell Cosima about the endgame plan and they accept the flaws in their relationship. Westmorland injects Rachel with the cure. Cosima realizes the man in the woods, Yanis, has a healing factor. At a dinner party held by Westmorland, Susan admits to trying to give it to the clones but it ended up passing to Kira. Westmorland's plan is to have Kira's eggs harvested to 1300 surrogates to control the healing factor. Ira begins glitching. Cosima is able to glean Westmorland's immortality is a lie and that's why he really wants to use Kira. Westmorland kills Yanis and locks Cosima in his cage. Meanwhile, Sarah offers to be more honest with Kira if she explains more about her link to the Leda clones; Kira wants to be a hustler like her mother. Delphine heads for Switzerland, but warns Siobhan that Kira is running out of time.
46	6	"Manacled Slim Wrists"	Grant Harvey	David Bezmozgis	July 15, 2017	224086-45	0.236
Krystal and her roommate Brie stumble into a current Dyad scheme involving cosmetics and the plan for Kira. Sarah and Art are forced to watch as Krystal takes charge in the hunt for answers. It turns out Neolution wants to spread Kira's genes to people through dermatology products. Rachel is temporarily fooled into letting Kira stay home but takes her from Siobhan after a call from Westmorland. Siobhan warns Rachel that she will need help one day. Meanwhile on the island, Dr. Coady returns much to Susan's chagrin and once Susan learns Westmorland is taking children's blood to extend his own life she prepares to kill him. Cosima and Ira persuade Mud to help them kill Westmorland, but she backs out. Cosima and Charlotte sail away after Cosima shows the Revival villagers Westmorland's immortality is a lie, and they riot. Ira finds Susan dead in the mansion as his glitching goes critical, Ira's fate is unclear.
47	7	"Gag or Throttle"	David Frazee	Renée St. Cyr	July 22, 2017	224086-46	0.278
Rachel returns to the island, meeting Coady after visiting Susan and Ira's graves. Though Westmorland promised her freedom and called her a daughter she still feels like part of the experiment. Flashbacks reveal she always struggled against it and could never get acceptance as an equal. Mark is brought to the island after making a deal with Coady for a Castor cure, Gracie visits Helena. Westmorland demands Kira be brought to him, and Rachel is horrified to learn her new eye has a camera to let him see and hear everything she does. Alison returns with a new look and attitude, shocking Donnie; while Cosima and Charlotte show up to continue research into Westmorland's origins. Sarah gets wind of what is planned for Kira and Cosima sends her Westmorland's real identity. Sarah emails this to Rachel at Dyad, but knowing Westmorland is spying, Rachel acts unmoved. Rachel drugs Kira but sends Art a message with her head turned away. Rachel wears an eye patch to release Kira to her family. Rachel exposes Westmorland to the rest of his backers and bloodily cuts out her prosthetic eye.
48	8	"Guillotines Decide"	Aaron Morton	Aisha Porter-Christie & Graeme Manson	July 29, 2017	224086-47	0.285
Ferdinand rescues Rachel from Dyad. Though Sarah is suspicious, Siobhan wants everyone to focus on the opening of Felix's art show that night. Siobhan and Delphine are revealed to be working with Ferdinand as a source. Their efforts have finally figured out Neolution's ultimate goals but they need hard data from Rachel to prove it all and warn the world. Ferdinand says he and Rachel can use this to blackmail Westmorland's backers and build an empire. Rachel betrays him and gives the real data to Siobhan to bring down Neolution. Delphine and Cosima then upload it. Sarah, Alison and Cosima become performance art posing as one person in Felix's show. Felix thanks his family for their support, especially Siobhan for taking him and Sarah in as children. Meanwhile, Gracie decides not to betray Helena but the Neolutionists trace her phone, capturing Helena, and Detective Engers kills Gracie. Ferdinand attacks Siobhan in her home and the two kill each other. Sarah senses Siobhan's death.
49	9	"One Fettered Slave"	David Frazee	Alex Levine	August 5, 2017	224086-48	0.305
After Siobhan's funeral, the sisters learn Helena has been kidnapped and that Neolution is trying to force the immediate birth of her twins. Westmorland's backers have started to be murdered but Felix and Art are able to get information with Rachel's help. They are hiding Helena in the abandoned asylum wing next to Dyad's main building, which is swarming with police and media with Neolution exposed. Sarah, disguised as Rachel, is taken there by Detective Engers. However, Sarah is caught before she can kill Westmorland/Mathieson. Meanwhile, Coady follows orders and euthanizes Mark, ending the Castors. Helena slits her wrist to die so her babies won't be abused like she was, but she is saved with Sarah's blood. Scott and Hell-Wizard sneak into Dyad to let Art inside the old wing. Helena bashes Coady's head against the gurney, and before she and Sarah can escape, her water breaks.
50	10	"To Right the Wrongs of Many"	John Fawcett	Renée St. Cyr & Graeme Manson	August 12, 2017	224086-49	0.376
Art sneaks in, knocks out Engers and finds Helena. Coady finds them and forces Art to tend to Helena at gunpoint, but the two work together and Art disarms Coady while Helena finally kills her by jamming a screwdriver into her neck. Sarah battles and kills Westmorland/Mathieson by crushing his skull with his own oxygen tank, saying the sisters survived and evolved beyond him. Sarah and Art help Helena deliver two healthy twin boys. Months later, Helena is living with the babies in the Hendrix garage and the clones and their allies meet for Helena's baby shower. With no conflict left to focus on, Sarah feels like the same failure of a mother and wants to run again. Her sisters calm her, so she happily stays. Rachel meets with Felix to give him the list of all 274 Ledas in the world. Though not part of the group and without her elitism anymore, Rachel is free. The sisters' journey ends as Alison and Donnie enjoy their happy marriage; Charlotte is taken in by Art; Helena names her babies after Arthur and Donnie; Cosima and Delphine travel the world curing all the unaware Ledas; and Sarah and Felix take Kira for a day at the beach.

== Ratings ==
Orphan Black : U.S. viewers per episode (thousands)

Season	Episode number									
Season	1	2	3	4	5	6	7	8	9	10
1	684	409	350	361	327	340	280	367	253	376
2	620	718	450	484	510	541	497	576	613	538
3	535	420	443	406	460	393	372	522	401	428
4	229	271	242	218	223	248	258	245	291	325
5	278	225	208	277	271	236	278	285	305	376

Audience measurement performed by Nielsen Media Research
