= Orphan Black (Original Television Soundtrack) =

Orphan Black: Original Television Soundtrack

Soundtrack album by Various Artists
- Released: May 19, 2015
- Length: 46:21 minutes
- Label: Varèse Sarabande Records

The Orphan Black Original Television Soundtrack is one of two soundtracks released on May 19, 2015 by Varèse Sarabande Records. It features music from the Canadian television series Orphan Black. The show was created by John Fawcett and Graeme Manson. Both soundtracks include a digital booklet when purchased with iTunes.

== Track listing ==
All music is composed by Various Artists.

No.	Title	Artist	Length
1.	"Theme From Orphan Black"	Two Fingers	0:37
2.	"Rain of Gold"	Young Empires	3:17
3.	"It Ain’t You"	The Ettes	2:24
4.	"Earthforms"	Matthew Dear	3:34
5.	"Mon Ton Ton"	Humans	4:39
6.	"Shuggie"	Foxygen	3:22
7.	"Bitch"	Meredith Brooks	4:13
8.	"Blame Fiction"	The Belle Game	3:52
9.	"Live in the Bedroom"	Tim Moxam	4:54
10.	"Head Over Heels"	Tears for Fears	4:16
11.	"Crazy"	Diana Salvatore	3:15
12.	"When I was Abroad"	Daniel Romano	2:17
13.	"West End Sky"	Elliott BROOD	2:40
14.	"Love Is All Around"	The Troggs	3:01
Total length:			46:21
