= Orphan Black (Original Television Score) =

Orphan Black: Original Television Score

Soundtrack album by Trevor Yuile
- Released: May 19, 2015
- Length: 45:43 minutes
- Label: Varèse Sarabande Records

The Orphan Black Original Television Score is one of two soundtracks released on May 19, 2015 by Varèse Sarabande Records. It features music from the Canadian television series Orphan Black. The show was created by John Fawcett and Graeme Manson. Both soundtracks include a digital booklet when purchased with iTunes. The score includes music from the first two seasons of Orphan Black composed by Trevor Yuile.

== Track listing ==
All music composed by Trevor Yuile except the Orphan Black Theme which was composed by Two Fingers.

All music is composed by Trevor Yuile.

No.	Title	Length
1.	"Orphan Black Theme"	0:36
2.	"Previously On"	1:06
3.	"Kira's Cue"	1:46
4.	"We Meet Helena"	1:47
5.	"Organic Eggs"	2:31
6.	"Duncan's Demise"	1:59
7.	"Unconditional Surrender"	2:06
8.	"Kira & Intervention"	3:05
9.	"They're Killing Us"	1:41
10.	"An Honour"	2:54
11.	"Cosima's Treatment"	1:44
12.	"Alison Kills"	3:19
13.	"Marriage of Helena"	2:13
14.	"I killed Ainsley"	0:48
15.	"Sequence of Events"	1:31
16.	"Cosima's Dying"	0:56
17.	"Farewell Thomas"	1:16
18.	"Rachel Meets Duncan"	1:31
19.	"Maggie Chen Crime Re-enact"	3:57
20.	"Rachael's Home Videos"	1:39
21.	"Endless Forms Most Beautiful"	7:18
Total length:		45:43
