= Instinct (Orphan Black) =

- Orphan Black episode
- Episode no.: Season 1 Episode 2
- Directed by: John Fawcett
- Written by: Graeme Manson
- Original air date: 6 April 2013
- Running time: 45 minutes

Guest appearances
- Inga Cadranel as Detective Angela DeAngelis; Ron Lea as Lieutenant Gavin Hardcastle; Skyler Wexler as Kira; Elizabeth Saunders as Dr. Anita Bower; Dom Fiore as Police Captain; Reid Janisse as Desk Clerk; Dale Samms as Hotel Security; Ivan Sherry as Internal Affairs Suit; Joanne Reece as Beth's Lawyer; Millie Davis as Gemma Hendrix; Drew Davis as Oscar Hendrix; Marqus Bobesich as Rockabilly Bob; Jamila Fleming as Sherry

Episode chronology
| ← Previous "Natural Selection" | Next → "Variation Under Nature" |

"Instinct" is the second episode of the first season of the Canadian science fiction television series Orphan Black. It first aired in Canada on Space and the United States on BBC America on 6 April 2013. The episode was written by Graeme Manson and directed by John Fawcett.

The plot follows Sarah Manning (played by Tatiana Maslany) as she continues to impersonate Beth Childs, a woman who looks identical to Sarah, in order to take Beth's money after seeing her commit suicide. In the episode, Sarah deals with the aftermath of the death of another identical woman, Katja Obinger, and begins to discover more lookalikes. Maslany plays each of the identical women; "Instinct" marked the first episode in which more than one of Maslany's characters was present in a single shot, which necessitated specific planning and technology to film and edit these scenes. The episode received positive reviews from critics, who praised the episode's plot development and Maslany's performance.

== Plot ==
After Katja is shot, Sarah flees in Beth's car and receives a call from a woman on Beth's phone. The woman, after hearing that Katja is dead, instructs Sarah to dispose of the body and retrieve Katja's briefcase. While burying Katja's body, Sarah finds a hotel key in her pocket and keeps it. She visits her foster brother Felix's apartment and discovers that the $75,000 she stole from Beth's bank account has been taken by Beth's detective partner Art. When she returns to Beth's apartment she is surprised to find Beth's boyfriend, Paul, who seems confused by Sarah's demeanour but does not realise that she is not Beth. The next day, Sarah prepares to meet Art, and lies that the $75,000 belongs to Paul, but Art says he will return the money only after the hearing Beth must attend about a suspicious shooting in which she was involved.

Sarah disguises herself as Katja and gains entrance to her hotel room in order to find Katja's briefcase. The room has been ransacked by the time she arrives but a hotel employee gives her the briefcase, which had been left with security. Inside the briefcase Sarah finds medical images, vials of blood, and evidence of more lookalikes, including a woman named Alison Hendrix, whose address is written on a note. Believing Alison to be the woman on the phone, Sarah drives to her address and follows her van to a soccer field, where she discovers that Alison is another of her lookalikes. Alison confronts Sarah, assuming that she is Beth, and refuses to believe Sarah when she explains that Beth killed herself, telling her to leave and wait for another call.

At the police station, pretending to be Beth, Sarah manipulates the resident psychiatrist into approving her return to duty, but Art refuses to give Sarah the money until she is fully reinstated. She receives a call from Alison, who tells her to bring the briefcase to her house that night. When Sarah and Felix arrive at Alison's house, Alison threatens them with a gun before relenting and introducing Sarah to another lookalike named Cosima.

== Production ==
"Instinct" was filmed in a block with the series' first episode, "Natural Selection", under the direction of Orphan Black co-creator John Fawcett. It was filmed in Canada, although it is never made clear where in North America the show takes place. The episode refers to the fictional suburb of Bailey Downs, where Alison is said to live, which is a homage to the setting of the 2000 Canadian horror film Ginger Snaps, which was directed by Fawcett. One of the filming locations used for the episode was the office used by the show's writers, which served as Beth's psychiatrist's office.

The episode featured one of the first scenes in which Maslany plays multiple characters interacting in the same shot. To construct the scene in which Sarah and Alison meet in the soccer field shed, Maslany and her stunt double Kathryn Alexandre first shot a master version of the scene using a Technodolly, a programmable camera crane that can memorise camera movements. Two versions of the scene were then re-filmed without Alexandre, with Maslany playing each of the characters. To simulate Alison placing her hand on Sarah's shoulder, a grip stand was used in the place of Sarah's shoulder for Maslany to hold when playing Alison, and to simulate Sarah slapping Alison's arm away, Maslany slapped the air when playing Sarah and reacted as if she had been hit when playing Alison. The final scene was created through digital compositing, whereby both versions of the scene—with Maslany playing both characters separately—are combined to produce a single shot. Maslany felt that, as one of her early attempts at sharing a scene with herself, she over-thought the process: "I think I was trying too hard to get it right. Nobody's there when you're shooting these things, so you overcompensate."

== Reception ==
Overall, "Instinct" was well received by critics. Caroline Framke of The A.V. Club gave the episode an A− grade, writing that the series "continues to walk a fine line with extraordinary subtlety and confidence". She gave particular praise to Maslany's acting, saying that she "handles every curveball, new character, and impersonation upon impersonation with extraordinary deftness". Tor.com's Robert H. Bedford commended the way the different storylines were integrated and particularly enjoyed the interactions between Art and Sarah. Den of Geek critic Rob Kemp thought that the episode was well developed and felt that it stood out from "the current crop of TV science fiction". He praised the serious nature of the episode as well as "the effort that has gone into grounding the show into reality". Simon Cocks of CultBox gave "Instinct" 4 out of 5 stars, describing it as "riveting television". He found Maslany's performance "incredible" and "effortless", and felt that her scenes with Art at the police station provided the strongest material. In a more mixed review for Twitch Film, Todd Brown opined that "Instinct" sometimes crossed "the line between camp and believability". He praised the development of the story and the characters but felt that while Maslany's acting was "remarkably strong as both Sarah and Sarah-Being-Beth her performance as Alison ... feels a bit shrill".
