= The Collapse of Nature =

- Orphan Black episode
- Beth Childs (Tatiana Maslany) inspects a corpse, one of the victims of a Neolution experiment.
- Episode no.: Season 4 Episode 1
- Directed by: John Fawcett
- Written by: Graeme Manson
- Original air date: 14 April 2016
- Running time: 44 minutes

Guest appearances
- Matt Frewer as Aldous Leekie; Skyler Wexler as Kira; David Richmond-Peck as Olivier Duval; Sarain Boylan as Astrid; Inga Cadranel as Detective Angela "Angie" DeAngelis; Ron Lea as Lieutenant Gavin Hardcastle (referenced in the episode as "Mike"); Ian Matthews as Frank; Miranda Edwards as Roxie; Allie MacDonald as Trina; Jessalyn Wanlim as Evie Cho; Gord Rand as Detective Duko; Raymond Ablack as Raj Singh (as Ray Ablack); Jean Yoon as Janis Beckwith; Alex Ozerov as Ramon; Michael Chwastiak as Vice Cop; Jonathan Nathaniel as Dresser; Jade Hassouné as Aaron; Monika Schurmann as Union Rep; Ava Arrindell as Maya Bell; Uni Park as Maggie Chen

Episode chronology
← Previous "History Yet to Be Written"	Next → "Transgressive Border Crossing"

"The Collapse of Nature" is the fourth season premiere of the Canadian science fiction television series Orphan Black. It first aired in Canada on Space and the United States on BBC America on 14 April 2016. The episode was written by Graeme Manson and directed by John Fawcett.

The series focuses on a number of identical human clones, all of whom are played by Tatiana Maslany: Sarah Manning, Beth Childs, Alison Hendrix, Cosima Niehaus, Rachel Duncan, Helena, MK and Krystal Goderitch. The format of the episode differs from all previous episodes, being a flashback episode taking place before the pilot episode. It follows Beth Childs (played by Tatiana Maslany) weeks before her suicide, as she investigates the operations of Neolution. Several guest actors returned in flashback scenes as characters who had died or been written off. Inga Cadranel, whose character Detective Angela "Angie" DeAngelis was written out after the second season, returned, as did Dylan Bruce as Paul Dierden after his character's death in the previous season.

The episode received positive reviews from critics, who praised the episode's plot development, a return to the basics of the first season in storytelling, as several critics pointed out the convoluted conspiracy plot of subsequent seasons, and Maslany's performance. It was watched by 229,000 American viewers.

As with all episodes this season, the episode title, "The Collapse of Nature," comes from Professor Donna Haraway's 1991 book Simians, Cyborgs, and Women: The Reinvention of Nature, being a specific excerpt from the essay entitled "The Biological Enterprise: Sex, Mind and Profit from Human Engineering to Sociobiology."

== Plot ==
Flashback to weeks prior to the events that occurred in the first episode of the series, "Natural Selection". A young woman wearing a sheep mask stumbles through the forest. As she hides behind a tree, she witnesses a white man, Frank (Ian Matthews), and a black woman, Roxie (Miranda Edwards), who are wearing paramedics uniforms, burying a body in the dirt. The two later kiss. The young woman becomes startled and cries out, which then attracts the attention of the couple who shine their flashlight in her direction. Before the two can come after her, the young woman places a teddy bear sticker on the tree she was hiding behind and runs away from the scene. She then calls Beth Childs to inform her of what she witnessed.

Beth and Art are present while the CSI team digs up the body in the woods. They find that the dead man had his cheek cut open, exposing the inside of his mouth, and Janis (Jean Yoon) discovers that the man had a surgically bifurcated penis. Beth begins investigating the man's death and discovers his connection to Club Neolution. She goes there to investigate and meets Trina (Allie MacDonald), a body-mod Neolutionist who informs Beth about the body modification and surgical alteration indicative of Neolution. She questions whether Trina knows anything, but before she can answer, her boyfriend, Aaron, stops her. Beth gives her number to Trina and tells her to call if she knows anything. Before leaving the club, Beth grabs a copy of Aldous Leekie's Neolution book and later is seen reading it in her car. She then goes to question Dr. Leekie (Matt Frewer) at the Dyad Institute. Dr. Leekie seems amused by the fact he monitors the well-being of Beth Childs, about which she has no idea. His right-hand-woman, Evie Cho, is excited to have finally seen one of the clones that Leekie monitors.

Throughout the episode, Beth's downward spiral is increasingly evident. She is shown often snorting crushed tablets and taking pills, her relationship with Paul has become strained as she suspects that he is monitoring her, and she is shown to be concerned about losing her job at the precinct due to her drug addiction. Whereas Sarah's relationship with Cosima and Alison is a sisterhood, the episode reveals that Beth's relationship with the two women was strictly for business. She trains Alison in gun defense, Cosima enrolls in college and begins studying biology at Beth's request in order to find out more about the clones. And Alison provides financial support for Cosima's studies and Beth's services, as well as providing pills for Beth and clean urine for Beth to use in order to pass her drug test at work.

Beth later meets with M.K. in a junkyard trailer, who communicates with her over the internet, warning her not to trust anybody, alluding to the fact that Art, or even Paul are potentially watching her as part of an experiment. This leads to Beth's greater suspicion of Paul, leading her to try to force sex upon him. Upon his refusal, she motions to shoot him in the head but later retreats.

Beth then seeks refuge at Art's apartment, where Art and his daughter are watching cartoons. Art sends her to bed, and the two then talk before kissing and having sex. Beth is woken up by a phone call from Trina, who is concerned about her boyfriend, saying that he was abducted by a couple of "dentists" who implanted an experimental mod worm in his cheek. Beth leaves the apartment and follows Trina's directions to an alleyway, where she spots an ambulance next to a fire escape. She swallows a pill before continuing. Trina tells her to go up the fire escape. She does, and eventually spots Frank and Roxie inside a room, cutting away Aaron's cheek and removing a worm. Watching from outside through a hole in the glass, she sees that the two are accompanied by Detective Duko (Gord Rand), a detective who works at her police precinct. Once the worm is removed, Beth becomes startled and motions to leave the scene, but then knocks into boxes on the fire escape, alarming the Neolutionists inside. She descends the fire escape, afraid of having been followed by the Neolutionists. As she exits the alleyway, she is becoming increasingly more disoriented due to the cocaine, and she shoots a woman on impulse, afraid that she was one of the Neolutionists. The woman is revealed to be Maggie Chen (Uni Park), whom Beth believes was simply an innocent bystander.

Beth frantically calls Art, telling him that she messed up. He then arrives at the scene, inserts a cell phone into Maggie Chen's hand, and tells Beth, "You saw a gun... now get your story straight". As more police show up, Lieutenant Hardcastle (Ron Lea) informs Beth that Detective Duko "is with the union." Duko assures her, "...I'll be with you the whole time." Realizing that there is no hope for her, she runs away to M.K.'s trailer, distraught. M.K. comforts her and tells her that she will do the thinking for both of them.

In the present in Iceland, Sarah and her daughter Kira (Skyler Wexler) are awakened by a phone call from Art. He hands the phone to M.K. who tells her that she knew Beth and that "Neolution knows where you are. They're coming for Kendall Malone. . . . You need to run, right now!"

== Production ==
"The Collapse of Nature" was directed by Orphan Black co-creator John Fawcett. It was filmed in Canada. Fawcett and Manson discussed at length the premise of the episode. Manson said that the flashback format was an "early idea". He went further saying, "we set the table a little bit in Season 3, Episode 6, where Sarah had an otherworldly dreamlike encounter with Beth, which we really liked. Then it just occurred to us that in a season where we really wanted to go back to the beginning… that now is the time to do it."

Ian Matthews (Frank) and Miranda Edwards (Roxie) were the first actors to be cast for the fourth season. The victim they bury at the beginning of the episode with the cut out cheek was the production team's first experience with "negative" make-up. Make-up designer Stephen Lynch created the outside of the wound and the cut flesh, while the VFX team later filled in the middle with special effects to make the inside of the mouth visible.

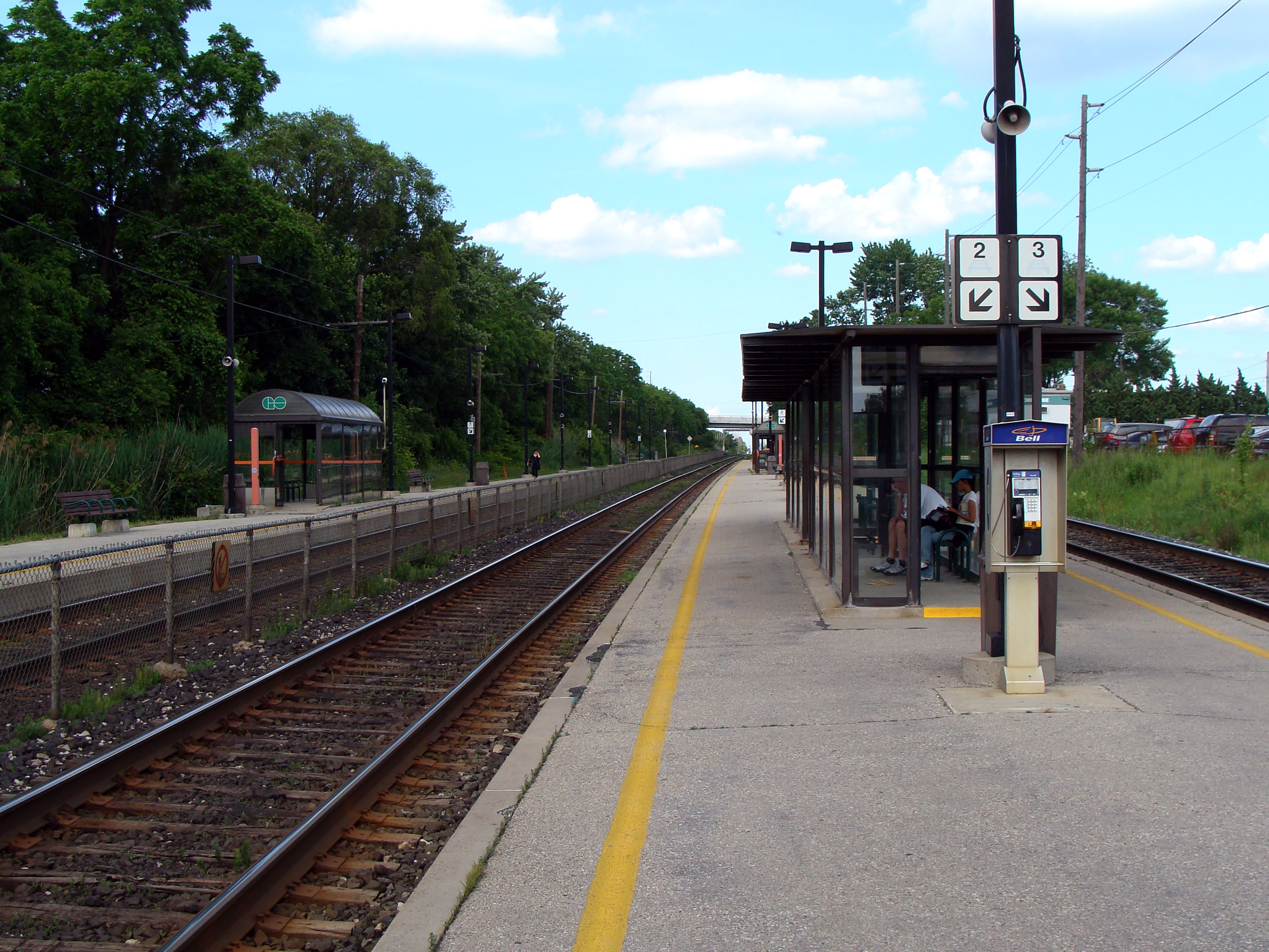
Railroad tracks which ran through the production location on Lake Shore Boulevard for M.K.'s trailer scene

As many of the sets utilized in the first and second seasons were destroyed, set designers had to rebuild several sets for production of the episode. Beth's condo was completely rebuilt in the studio to mimic the colors, wallpapers, fixtures, and furniture of the original set; however, differences can be seen in the size of space and the lighting fixtures used in the washroom. Additionally, the police precinct was rebuilt in the hallway of the production studio. The art department painted tiles onto the cement studio floor. Instead of matching the rebuild to the original set, they decided to expand upon the original precinct by adding a new boardroom, office, and hallway. For the episode, production also revisited two prominent season one locations, Thompson Diner (Fung's Diner) and Uniun Nightclub (Club Neolution), whose interior décor had remained the same in the two years since filming for season one. The exterior shots for Club Neolution were filmed outside of the actual Nightclub, as opposed to season one where filming had to be done at a warehouse. The art department had to remake some of the exterior parts of the club in order to match what was seen in the first season.

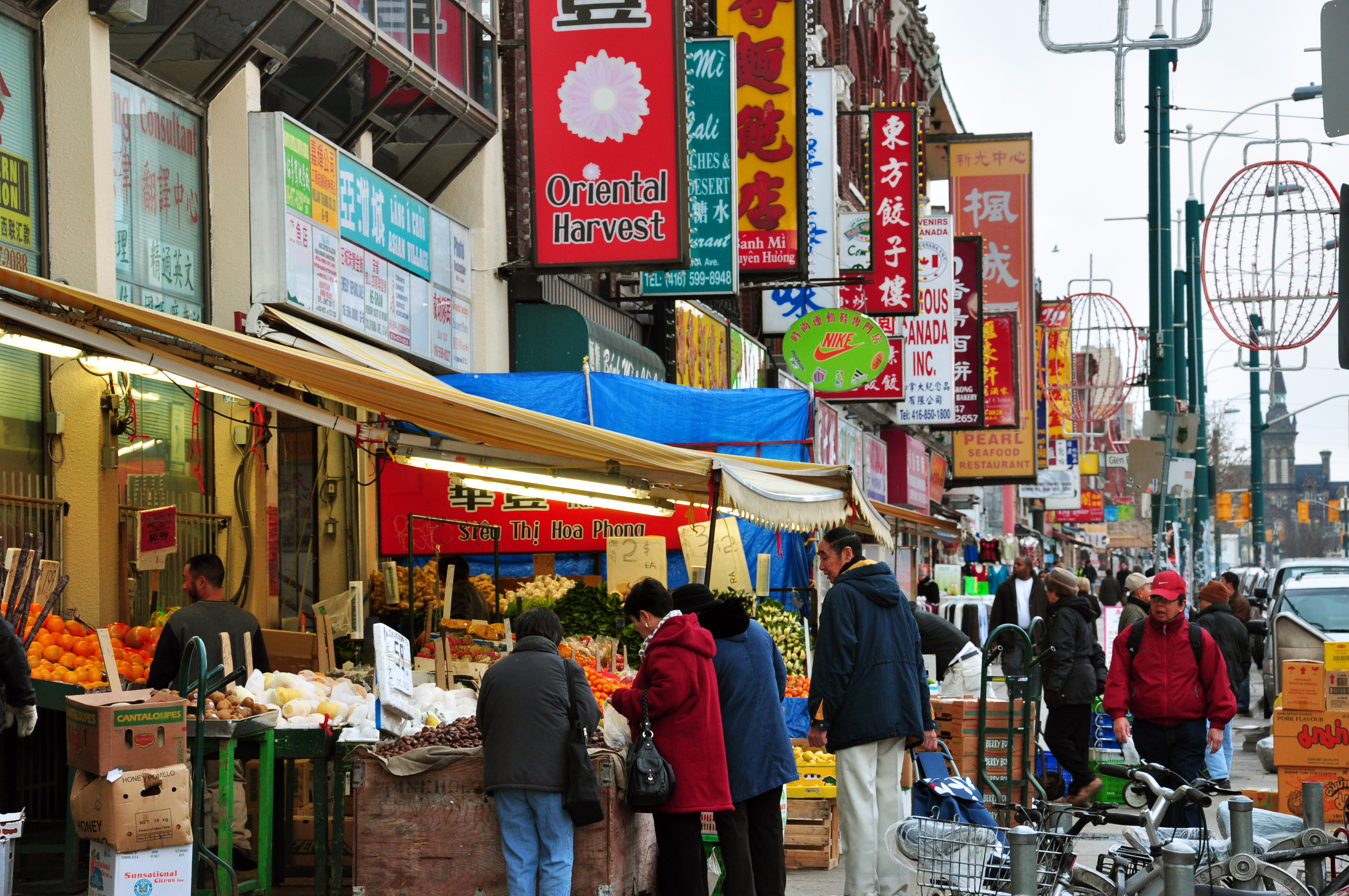
Toronto's Chinatown was an inspiration for the production of Maggie Chen's shooting scene

M.K.'s trailer set was based on a real location in Toronto, just off of Lake Shore Boulevard. The interior was built to match a trailer and shipping container that was found on site near the railroad. Most of the junk was already in place on the filming location, and production had to add very little to make it a junkyard. M.K.'s trailer interior had more set dressing than production had used for any previous set. The sheep mask that M.K. dons was narrowed down from 60 masks that were originally purchased for production. Once Graeme and John decided the final product was going to be a sheep, the art department created 14 different masks and the final choice was edited to reflect a late-1980s style, as M.K. would have had the mask from childhood.

For the scene near the end of the episode when Beth shoots Maggie Chen, an actress was recast to play the role of Maggie, as the original actress was cast very early in production of season one and only specifically for crime scene photos. Uni Park was eventually cast for her close resemblance to the original actress, and the clothing utilized for the crime scene photos had to be recreated for the episode, since the original clothing had been disposed of. For the scene, production wanted a location that felt like Chinatown but closely resembled the crime scene photos, so a Pearl Street alleyway was eventually used with additions of neon lights and Chinese advertisements in order to reflect the look of Toronto's Chinatown.

== Science ==
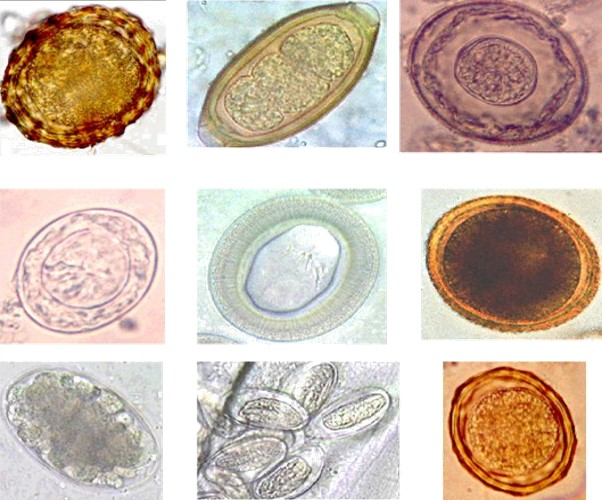
Various Helminth eggs, whose effects could resemble those of the Neolution worms seen in the episode

In regards to the body-mod worms featured in the episode, Casey Griffin and Nina Nesseth of The Mary Sue offered two scientific explanations. The first explanation, they theorized, could be the Neolutionist utilizing the worms as a form of experimental gene therapy. Citing examples of the Schistosoma mansoni, a parasitic worm whose eggs release a protein which can bind to DNA and replicate alongside it, and Helminths, parasitic worms which have been used to treat autoimmune disorders, as possibilities for effectively introducing new genetic material into a host in order to garner a desired gene alteration.

Their second theory is that the body-mod worms could be utilized for parasitic mind control, infecting their hosts and controlling them to create "some sort of Neolution army that can do their bidding." They cite Hymenoepimecis argyraphaga, a parasitic wasp which lays eggs in the abdomen of orb spiders that inject a chemical into the spider when they become larvae, "forcing them to create a unique web-like structure to support the wasp’s cocoon," as an example of this in nature. They also reference Euhaplorchis californiensis, an ocean-dwelling fluke which controls the brains of fish via chemical excretions, and Toxoplasma gondii, a microbe which can infect humans and cause greater risk-taking behaviors and lowered impulse control, as organisms which could be beneficial to Neolutionist motivations.

== Reception ==
Overall, "The Collapse of Nature" was critically acclaimed. It earned a 100% rating with an average score of 8.8 out of 10 on Rotten Tomatoes based on 9 reviews.

Lisa Weidenfeld of The A.V. Club gave the episode an A− grade, writing that "Tatiana Maslany’s acting justifiably gets endless kudos for this show, but it’s always worth giving credit to the makeup and costume department as well. As Beth, she looked haunted, exhausted, and ill, with tangled hair and a wardrobe that suggested a Type A personality that’s collapsed in on itself. Sarah may have had similar enough hair to slip into Beth’s identity, but in only a few scenes, the show quickly established how little that should have fooled anyone. Den of Geek critic Marc Buxton praised "the absolute brilliance of Tatiana Maslany" and the "ballsy move" of crafting the season premiere as a flashback episode. He went further to say, "somehow, this episode is the most gripping and intense installment of Orphan Black that I’ve watched in years. You may think you’ll be disappointed that your favorites are nowhere to be seen, but relax, five minutes of watching Maslany playing Beth in the cop’s final days, you will be riveted." Caroline Framke for Vox praised the episode's return to the simplicity of the first season. She criticized the convoluted nature of the third season's storytelling. She wrote, "it's so promising that the fourth season premiere takes a deep breath and a significant step back from Orphan Black's preexisting, overlapping stories. In a risky move, "The Collapse of Nature" holds off on forging ahead from where the show left off to travel back in time, all the way back to the beginning. It's the smartest move Orphan Black has made in ages". She summarized her thoughts as a whole saying that the show "lost some viewers last season as it kept burrowing ever deeper into its own mythology. When the show is off its game, it's a confused jumble of sci-fi nonsense and good intentions. But when Orphan Black is good, it's a laser-focused, hyper-imaginative gem. If this fourth season can sweep aside some of the clutter and find its surreal, fiercely intelligent core again, there's no reason to believe it will be anything other than great."

Noem Cohen of The New York Observer praised the episode saying, "Orphan Black uses the unique qualities of its narrative, and especially Maslany's tremendous performance, to play with our expectations, to make us question ideas we take for granted." In a more critical review, Max Nicholson of IGN rated the episode a 7.8 out of 10, indicating a "good" episode. While he praised the Beth-centric plot that allowed viewers to see key moments leading up to her suicide, the intriguing Neolutionist mystery, and the "back to basics" storyline which offered ties to the first season, he also felt that too much of the plot was retread of moments already experienced, and he decried many of the episode cameos, such as Olivier and Felix, as "pointless and fan-servicey." However, overall, he felt that the episode was a "smart move" after the "muddled ending of season 3."
