= Governed by Sound Reason and True Religion =

- Orphan Black episode
- Episode no.: Season 2 Episode 2
- Directed by: John Fawcett
- Written by: Karen Walton; Graeme Manson
- Original air date: 26 April 2014
- Running time: 43 minutes

Episode chronology
← Previous "Nature Under Constraint and Vexed"	Next → "Mingling Its Own Nature With It"

"Governed by Sound Reason and True Religion" is the second episode of the second season, and the twelfth episode overall, of the Canadian science fiction television series Orphan Black. It first aired in Canada on Space and the United States on BBC America on 26 April 2014. The episode was written by Karen Walton and Graeme Manson, and directed by John Fawcett.

== Plot ==
Kira calls Sarah, and Art traces it to a motel. Sarah gets kidnapped, while Art has a run-in with Daniel that later results in his suspension. Sarah is taken to Mrs. S, who reveals she ran away with Kira and made it look like a kidnapping. They go to a country house owned by two compatriots. Later that night, Kira admits she no longer trusts Mrs. S, so she and Sarah attempt to escape. Mrs. S learns that her compatriots plan to sell Kira to the Proletheans; she kills the two to allow Kira and Sarah to escape. Meanwhile, during Aynsley's funeral, Alison begins to suspect that Donnie was her monitor all along, so she and Felix set a trap for him that confirms her suspicions. Alison returns to drinking from the guilt of Aynsley's death. Cosima and Delphine set up a new lab at the Dyad institute to learn more about the former's condition. Art's partner Angela Deangelis learns of Helena's existence, but when she visits the hospital, Mark has taken Helena away to a ranch owned by Henrik Johanssen, the Prolethean leader who plans to use Helena to create a baby. Henrik has Tomas killed for objecting to his plan.

== Production ==
"Governed by Sound Reason and True Religion" was shot in August–September 2013 in conjunction with the first episode of the second season, "Nature Under Constraint and Vexed", like the first two episodes of season 1 which were filmed together. Scenes at the Birdwatchers' hideout were filmed in an uninhabited house located near the Toronto Zoo. The set for Cosima's laboratory was built on a soundstage, but its design was partly based on the actual architecture of the building used to film exterior shots of the DYAD facilities.

In the episode, Sarah and Helena are revealed to be mirror-image twins—that is, identical twins in which one twin's entire anatomy is reversed, including their internal organs, so that each twin appears to be a "mirror image" of the other. Manson discovered the phenomenon while researching for the first season and decided to incorporate it into the plot to "make the science realistic in surprising ways". Fawcett said that the writers decided that Alison should learn that Donnie is her monitor—a fact revealed to the audience at the climax of the first season—in this episode since they intended "to reveal the mystery through the eyes of the character rather than let the audience in on things that the characters don't know". They thought that prolonging Alison's ignorance of the fact would make her character "look dumb". The episode's title is taken from a quote from Francis Bacon's philosophical work Novum Organum: "Only let the human race recover that right over nature which belongs to it by divine bequest; the exercise thereof will be governed by sound reason and true religion."

== Reception ==
"Governed by Sound Reason and True Religion" was aired in the United States on 26 April 2014 on BBC America. It was watched by 718,000 viewers, with a Nielsen rating of 0.29 in the demographic of adults aged 18–49.

Mark Rozeman wrote for Paste that the episode's events "certainly highlight just how quickly the show burns through plot points". He praised Maslany and the series' writers for the dark humour of Alison's storyline and for "gleefully eschew[ing]" the conventions of traditional television. Entertainment Weekly's Darren Franich enjoyed the episode's exploration of the conflicting philosophies of the Dyad corporation and the Prolethean cult. He thought that Helena's survival of a gunshot to the chest was an "extraordinarily unlikely event" but conceded that in science fiction "we oughtn't pick and choose which beliefs we're suspending". Eric Goldman of IGN praised Peter Outerbridge's performance as Henrik and the development of Mrs. S's character. Slant Magazine's Matt Brennan opined that the episode "finds Orphan Black in peak form, dispensing with niceties in favor of taut, economical sequences that push the narrative forward along these lines." He found the different storylines to form a cohesive whole but also individually satisfying; he gave particular praise to Alison's comedic subplot. Caroline Framke gave "Governed By Sound Reason and True Religion" a B+ grade for The A.V. Club, while Danielle Henderson rated it 3 out of 5 stars for Vulture.
