= Basic Instinct (disambiguation) =

Basic Instinct is a 1992 thriller film.

Basic Instinct may also refer to:

- Basic Instinct 2, a 2006 sequel to Basic Instinct
- Basic Instinct (album), a 2010 album by American singer Ciara
  - "Basic Instinct (U Got Me)", a song from the above album

== See also ==
- Instinct (disambiguation)
