= Lucky Girl (2001 film) =

2001 film by John Fawcett

- Promotional artwork
- Screenplay by: Graeme Manson; John Frizzell
- Story by: John Frizzell
- Directed by: John Fawcett
- Starring: Elisha Cuthbert; Sherry Miller; Sarah Osman; Evan Sabba; Charlotte Sullivan
- Music by: Mike Shields
- Country of origin: Canada
- Original language: English

Production
- Producers: Charles Gordon; Louise Garfield; Claire Welland
- Cinematography: Gavin Smith
- Editor: Brett Sullivan
- Running time: 100 minutes
- Production companies: Alliance Atlantis; Triptych Media

Original release
- Network: CTV Television Network
- Release: April 8, 2001

Lucky Girl (released in the United States as My Daughter's Secret Life) is a 2001 Canadian television drama film directed by John Fawcett and starring Elisha Cuthbert, Sherry Miller, and Charlotte Sullivan. The film is about a high school student whose obsession with gambling leads to her accumulating a mountain of debt and her life unraveling.

== Plot ==
After winning a $10 prize lottery ticket, popular teenage honors student Kaitlyn becomes interested in gambling. At her birthday party, she holds a poker game which Kaitlyn manages to win. Later, Kaitlyn meets and develops a romantic interest in Ron, the older brother of one of her classmates, at a gambling casino.

Kaitlyn views the recent sequence of events as a means by which to raise money for her impending trip to Amsterdam with her friend Cheryl. She soon becomes involved in sports betting in order to make more money. Her parents view her enthusiasm for sports such as basketball and football as merely a phase. Her mother suspects that Kaitlyn watches the sports simply to admire the male athletes. Her father, however, advises her to be cautious and to never make a bet over five dollars. He also uses Kaitlyn's new interest as a means by which to teach Kaitlyn's brother mathematics.

As Kaitlyn begins to lose money, she starts behaving more erratically. She steals her mother, Valerie's credit card, becomes addicted to internet gambling, neglects her personal appearance and schoolwork, and some of her male classmates assault her physically when she does not pay them the money she had promised. Because of this, Kaitlyn begins borrowing money from a shady loan shark named Blair Noth. The stakes increase when Kaitlyn becomes involved in illegal gambling. By this time, her life is out of control, she lies about the extent of her problems, and she loses more money than she ever thought possible. With the help of Ron, Kaitlyn robs her own house. Ron's sister, Janice, confronts Kaitlyn at school about how 'screwed up' Ron is becoming. Cheryl realizes Kaitlyn used her as an alibi for her house robbery and feels betrayed.

Once her parents discover the true nature of Kaitlyn's troubles, she is at the point where she is forced by Blair and his wife, Judy, to prostitute herself overcome her debts, just like what they did to Ron. Blair also threatened to blackmail Kaitlyn for telling Valerie of robbery. With the help of Ron, Valerie rescues her, but Blair threatens to Valerie he will "tear her family apart" if she tells. As they leave, Valerie retaliates by bashing Blair across the head twice with a wheellock. Kaitlyn finally admits to her family how gambling has overtaken her life. The police arrive at Blair's house and collect enough evidence against both him and Judy, who are arrested for their crimes, while Ron sits outside the house in his truck, indicating he finally had the courage to call the police on them.

Some time later, Kaitlyn has entered rehab for her gambling addiction and reconciled with Cheryl. At the mall, Cheryl buys a birthday gift for Kaitlyn's brother on her behalf. However, after Cheryl leaves, Kaitlyn returns the gift and uses the cash to play on a gambling machine in a restaurant.

== Cast ==
- Elisha Cuthbert as Kaitlyn Palmerston
- Sherry Miller as Valerie Palmerston
- Evan Sabba as Ron Lunderman
- Greg Ellwand as Blair Noth
- Sarah Osman as Cheryl Bemberg
- Jonathan Whittaker as Alastair Palmerston
- Charlotte Sullivan as Janice
- Victoria Snow as Judy
- Jordan Madley as Mauree
- Steven Taylor as Terry Palmerston
- Steve Ross as Matt Burman

== Production ==
The film was shot in Toronto, Canada over a twenty-day period in the fall of 2000. The film marked director John Fawcett's followup to the horror film Ginger Snaps (2000).

== Release ==
Lucky Girl premiered in Canada on the CTV Television Network on April 8, 2001. In the United States, the film aired on Lifetime under the alternate title My Daughter's Secret Life in November 2001.

== Accolades ==
Award/association	Year	Category	Recipient(s) and nominee(s)	Result	Ref.
Directors Guild of Canada	2001	Outstanding Achievement in Sound Editing	David McCallum	Nominated	
Directors Guild of Canada	2001	Outstanding Achievement in a Television Movie/Mini-Series		Nominated	
Gemini Awards	2001	Best TV Movie		Nominated	
Gemini Awards	2001	Best Performance by an Actress in a Leading Role in a Dramatic Program or Mini-Series	Elisha Cuthbert	Won	
Gemini Awards	2001	Best Performance by an Actress in a Featured Supporting Role in a Dramatic Program or Mini-Series	Sherry Miller	Won	
Gemini Awards	2001	Best Writing in a Dramatic Program or Mini-Series	John Frizzell; Graeme Manson	Nominated	
Gemini Awards	2001	Best Picture Editing in a Dramatic Program or Series	Brett Sullivan	Nominated	
Writers Guild of Canada	2001	WGC Award	Graeme Manson; John Frizzell	Won	
