= Instinct (disambiguation) =

Instinct is the inherent disposition of a living organism toward a particular behavior.

Instinct may also refer to:

== Fiction ==
- Instinct (1930 film), a French drama film
- Instinct (1999 film), a film starring Anthony Hopkins and Cuba Gooding Jr.
- Instinct (2019 film), a Dutch film
- "Instinct" (Dollhouse), an episode of Dollhouse
- "Instinct" (Stargate Atlantis), an episode of Stargate Atlantis
- "Instinct" (Sanctuary), an episode of Sanctuary
- "Instinct" (Orphan Black), an episode of Orphan Black
- Instinct (Hong Kong TV series), a 1994 Hong Kong television series
- Instinct (TV serial), a 2007 crime drama starring Anthony Flanagan
- Instinct (American TV series), a 2018 American television series
- Team Instinct, a team on Pokémon Go
- The Instinct (film), a 2024 psychological thriller film

== Music ==
- Instinct Records, a record label
- Instinct (Iggy Pop album), 1998
- Instinct (Ektomorf album), 2005
- Instinct (Kavana album), 1998
- Instinct (Mandalay album), 2000
- Instinct (Granrodeo album), 2008
- Instinct (As Blood Runs Black album), 2011
- Instinct (Niki and the Dove album), 2012
- The Instinct (album), an album by Denali, 2003
- Instincts (album), by Romeo Void, 1983
- "Instinct" (song), a 1996 song by Crowded House
- "Instinct", a 1997 song by Sadist from the album Crust
- "Instinction", a 1982 song by Spandau Ballet
- "Instinct", one of three brands of the record label Monstercat

== Technology ==
- AMD Instinct, a line of supercomputer accelerators.
- Samsung M800 Instinct, an Internet-enabled touch-based multimedia mobile phone
- Instinct, a line of smartwatches by Garmin

== Other uses ==
- Instincts are, in psychoanalysis, human motivational drives (such as sex and aggression)
- Instinct (magazine), a magazine for gay men
