= Kathryn Alexandre =

Canadian actress

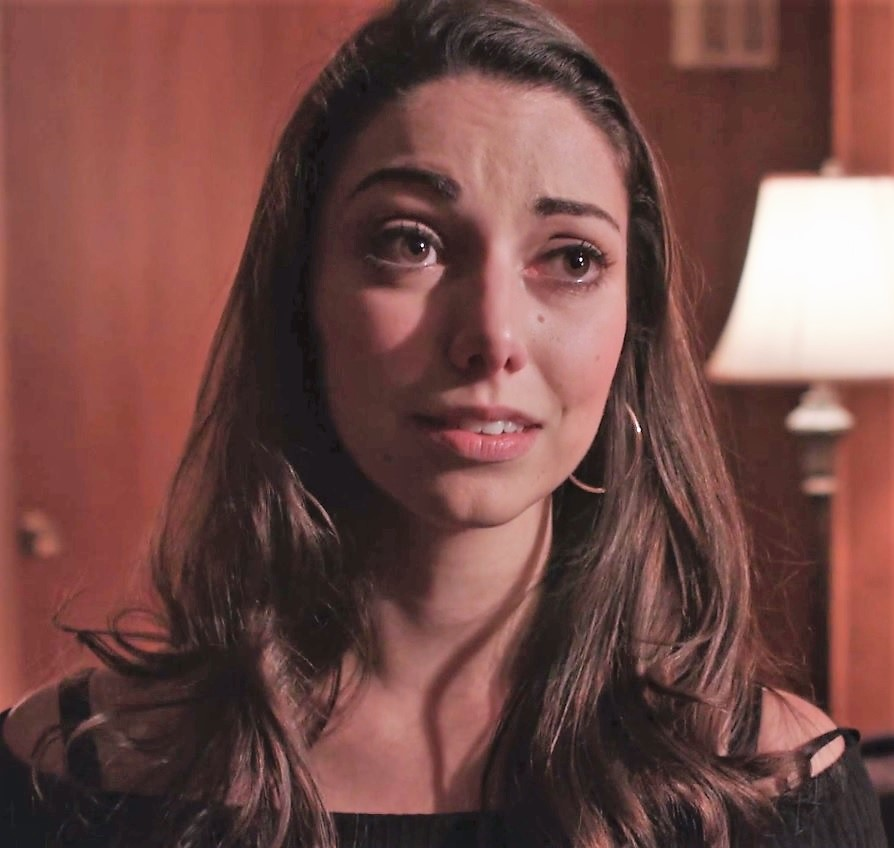
- Kathryn Alexandre in a 2015 scene study
- Occupation: Actress
- Years active: 2008–present
- Known for: Orphan Black

Kathryn Alexandre is a Canadian actress. She was the acting double for Tatiana Maslany in the BBC America/Space show Orphan Black and acts as all eleven of the roles of clones opposite Maslany. She does not appear in the clone roles in the aired episodes because motion control cameras and post-production compositing are used to replace her with Maslany's performances. However, Alexandre does appear on camera in another role as Alexis in the series. She graduated from the Theatre & Drama program at the University of Toronto Mississauga and Sheridan College in 2011.

== Filmography ==
Year	Title	Role	Notes
2011	The Umbrella Project	Ruby	Short film
2013	Breakout	Homegirl	TV series
2013	Darknet	Glenda	TV series
2013	Saving Hope	Jackie Nealon	TV series
2013–2017	Orphan Black	Acting double	TV series; acting double
2014	Reign	Lady Barnard	TV series; guest star
2014–2015	Orphan Black	Alexis	Recurring role; seasons 2 & 3
2017	Designated Survivor	ER Doctor #1	TV series
2017	People of Earth	Acting Double	TV series
2017	Touch	Laura	Short film
2017	12 Monkeys	Old Jennifer Goines	TV series
2018	Cardinal	Abby Harris	TV series; recurring role
2018	Murdoch Mysteries	Florence Nightingale Graham	TV series; guest star
2019	Diggstown	Ainslie MacKay	TV series; guest star
