= Orphan Black =

2013 Canadian science fiction thriller television series

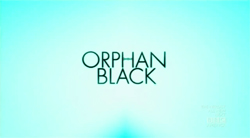
- Genre: Science fiction; Biopunk; Drama; Thriller
- Created by: Graeme Manson; John Fawcett
- Starring: Tatiana Maslany; Dylan Bruce; Jordan Gavaris; Kevin Hanchard; Michael Mando; Maria Doyle Kennedy; Evelyne Brochu; Ari Millen; Kristian Bruun; Josh Vokey
- Theme music composer: Two Fingers
- Composer: Trevor Yuile
- Country of origin: Canada
- Original language: English
- No. of seasons: 5
- No. of episodes: 50 (list of episodes)

Production
- Executive producers: Ivan Schneeberg; David Fortier; Graeme Manson; John Fawcett; Kerry Appleyard
- Producers: Russ Cochrane; Alex Levine; Claire Welland; Tatiana Maslany; Aubrey Nealon; Mackenzie Donaldson; Karen Walton; Jay Prychidny
- Production locations: Toronto, Ontario, Canada
- Cinematography: Aaron Morton
- Editors: Jay Prychidny; D. Gillian Truster; Brett Sullivan; Reginald Harkema; Stephen Lawrence
- Running time: 43 minutes
- Production companies: Temple Street Productions; BBC America; Bell Media

Original release
- Network: Space (Canada); BBC America (United States)
- Release: March 30, 2013 – August 12, 2017

Related
- Orphan Black: Echoes

Orphan Black is a Canadian science-fiction thriller television series created by screenwriter Graeme Manson and director John Fawcett and starring Tatiana Maslany. The series focuses on Sarah Manning, one of several genetically identical human clones, and later on some of the other clones. The series raises issues about the moral and ethical implications of human cloning and its effect on identity.

The series was produced by Temple Street Productions in association with BBC America and Bell Media's Space. The show premiered on March 30, 2013, on Space in Canada, and on BBC America in the United States. On June 16, 2016, the series was renewed for a fifth and final ten-episode season, which ran from June 10 to August 12, 2017. An aftershow, After the Black, began airing in the third season on Space and was acquired by BBC America for the fourth season. In April 2022, a spin-off titled Orphan Black: Echoes was announced, which premiered in June 2024 on AMC. An Orphan Black comic book series was started in 2015 but was cancelled in 2018 before the end of its contract.

Orphan Black developed a loyal online fan base across social media platforms who identify as #CloneClub, a reference to those who are in-the-know in the story. Throughout its run, the series received critical acclaim and various accolades, particularly for Maslany's performances, which earned her a Primetime Emmy Award, two Critics' Choice Television Awards and two further nominations, one TCA Award and one further nomination, two Satellite Award nominations, and a Golden Globe Award and Screen Actors Guild Award nomination. The series won a Peabody Award in 2013 and has been nominated for, and won, several Canadian Screen Awards.

== Plot ==
The series begins with Sarah Manning, a con artist of British origin residing in Toronto, witnessing the suicide of a woman, Beth Childs, who appears to be her doppelgänger. Sarah assumes Beth's identity and occupation (as a police detective) after Beth's death. During the first season, in episode 3, Sarah discovers that she is a clone, that she has many "sister" clones spread throughout North America and Europe that are all part of an illegal human cloning experiment, and that someone is plotting to kill them and her.

Alongside her foster brother, Felix Dawkins, and two of her fellow clones, Alison Hendrix and Cosima Niehaus, Sarah discovers the origin of the clones: a scientific movement called Neolution. The movement believes that human beings can use scientific knowledge to direct their evolution as a species. The movement has an institutional base in the large, influential, and wealthy biotech corporation the Dyad Institute, which is seemingly headed by Dr. Aldous Leekie. The Dyad Institute conducts basic research, lobbies political institutions, and promotes its eugenics program, aided by the clone Rachel Duncan. It also seeks to profit from the technology the clones embody and has thus placed "monitors" into the clones' personal lives, allegedly to study them scientifically but actually to keep them under surveillance.

Sarah eventually discovers that she is also wanted by the police and by a secret religious group, the Proletheans. A faction of the Proletheans carries out the clone assassinations because they believe clones are abominations, and they use Sarah's biological twin sister, Helena, to kill the other clones. Sarah and Helena share a surrogate birth mother and are twins both genetically and with respect to their early maternal environment.

Eventually, the Dyad Institute and the Proletheans learn that Sarah has a daughter, Kira, the only known offspring of a clone; all other clones are sterile by design. The plotlines of the series revolve around Sarah and Kira's efforts to avoid capture by the clearly sinister Neolutionists and Proletheans, as well as around the efforts made by each clone to give sense to her life and origin.

The attempt to control the creation of human life is a dominant theme that drives various story lines. A second key theme forms around the intrigues made by the Dyad Group and the Proletheans, along with the earlier intrigues made by the authors of Project LEDA (an allusion to the Greek myth Leda and the Swan), Sarah's foster mother Mrs. S., and her political network.

Both themes intersect in the effort to control the creation of human life. Sarah, who matures because of her struggles, defends the bond between parent and child against the Neolutionists and Proletheans.

== Cast and characters ==
=== Main ===
The five main clone characters all played by Tatiana Maslany (from left to right, top to bottom: Sarah, Alison, Helena, Cosima, and Rachel)

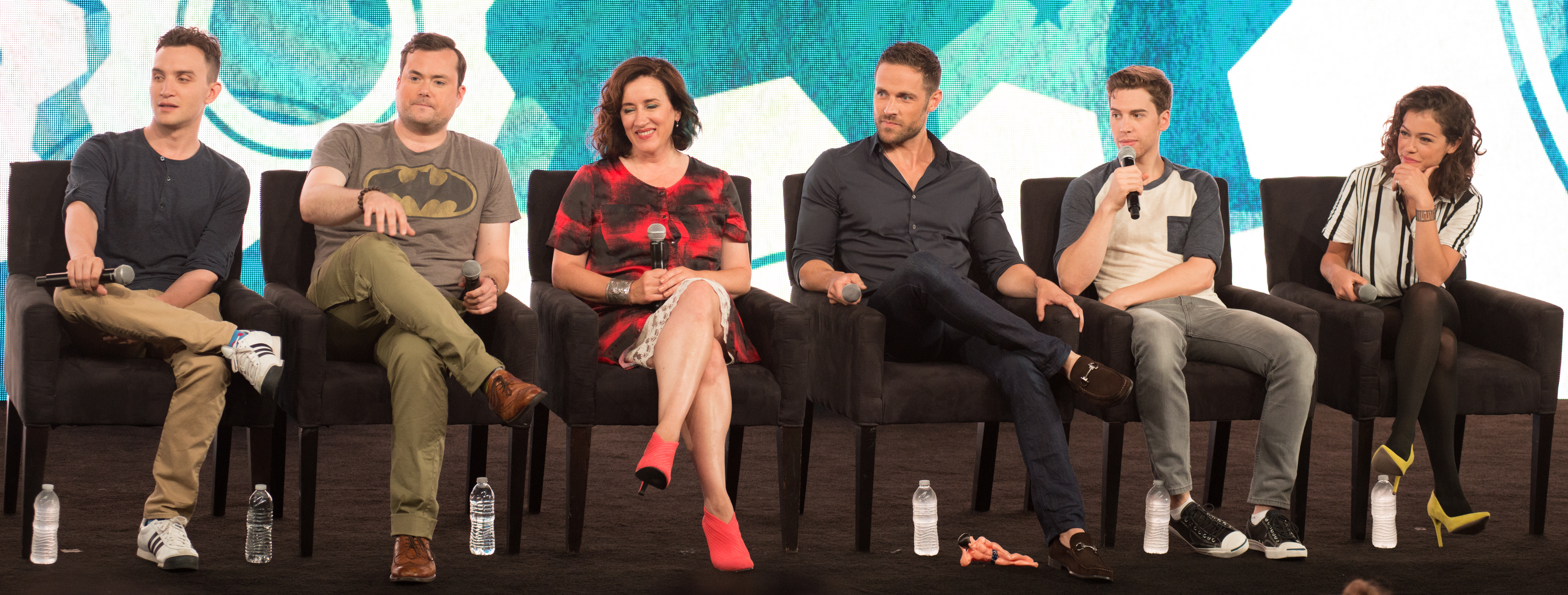
Orphan Black cast members, from left to right: Ari Millen, Kristian Bruun, Maria Doyle Kennedy, Dylan Bruce, Jordan Gavaris, and Tatiana Maslany

- Tatiana Maslany as Sarah Manning, Alison Hendrix, Cosima Niehaus, Helena, Rachel Duncan, and several other Project Leda clones all born in 1984 to various women by in vitro fertilization
- Dylan Bruce as Paul Dierden, an ex-military mercenary, who is Beth's monitor and boyfriend (seasons 1–4)
- Jordan Gavaris as Felix "Fee" Dawkins, Sarah's foster brother and confidant. He identifies as a modern artist and moonlights as a sex worker. He is the first person Sarah confides in about the existence of clones. Gavaris reprises his role in the spin-off series Orphan Black: Echoes.
- Kevin Hanchard as Art Bell, a detective and Beth's police partner
- Michael Mando as Vic Schmidt, Sarah's abusive, drug-dealing ex-boyfriend (main season 1, recurring season 2)
- Maria Doyle Kennedy as Siobhan Sadler, Sarah and Felix's Irish foster mother. They call her "Mrs. S" or simply "S". She acts as guardian to Sarah's daughter Kira while Sarah is away.
- Evelyne Brochu as Delphine Cormier, Cosima's monitor, girlfriend, and fellow scientist (recurring seasons 1, 4–5; main seasons 2–3). Brochu reprises her role in the spin-off series Orphan Black: Echoes.
- Ari Millen as Mark Rollins, a Prolethean; Ira, Susan Duncan's adopted son; and a number of other male Project Castor clones. (recurring season 2, main seasons 3–5)
- Kristian Bruun as Donnie Hendrix, Alison's husband and monitor (recurring seasons 1–2, main seasons 3–5)
- Josh Vokey as Scott Smith, a fellow student of Cosima at the University of Minnesota, who later joins her and Delphine at the Dyad Institute (recurring seasons 1–3, main seasons 4–5)

=== Recurring ===
- Skyler Wexler as Kira Manning, Sarah and Cal's biological, naturally conceived daughter. The only child of a clone, she demonstrates an apparent accelerated healing ability that makes her a desired object of study by Neolution. Kira is one of the main characters in the spin-off series Orphan Black: Echoes and is played by Keeley Hawes as an adult.
- Inga Cadranel as Angie Deangelis, a detective and Art's new partner who is trying to uncover the clone conspiracy behind Art's back (seasons 1–2, 4)
- Matt Frewer as Aldous Leekie, frontman of the Institute and the face of the Neolution movement (seasons 1–2, 4–5)
- Matthew Bennett as Daniel Rosen, a Dyad associated lawyer, assigned to do Rachel's shady work. He had a sexual relationship with Rachel and also acted as her monitor with her knowledge. (seasons 1–2)
- Daniel Kash as Tomas, who is responsible for the kidnapping, training and subsequent psychological and physical abuse of Helena (seasons 1–2, 5)
- Michiel Huisman as Cal Morrison, one of Sarah's past con-victims and Kira's father (seasons 2–3)
- Michelle Forbes as Marion Bowles, a high-ranking official within Topside–a group controlling Dyad–who outranks both Leekie and Rachel. She contacts Cal and Mrs. S to free Sarah and Kira from Dyad. It is revealed that she is raising the youngest Leda clone, Charlotte, and is battling the military and their male clones of Project Castor, holding one of the male clones in her home. As Charlotte is shown to be in the care of Dr. Susan Duncan (Rachel's adoptive mother and one of the lead scientists of Project Leda), Marion was presumed dead. (season 2)
- Cynthia Galant as Charlotte Bowles, the youngest of the Leda clones (seasons 2–5)
- Natalie Lisinska as Aynsley Norris, Alison's neighbour who is also suspected of being her monitor (seasons 1–2, 5)
- Peter Outerbridge as Hank Johanssen, a Prolethean leader, attempting to revalue their view on science and forcibly proliferate Helena's miraculous genes at the expense of everyone closest to him (season 2)
- Zoé De Grand Maison as Gracie Johanssen, Henrik and Bonnie's teenage daughter, who eventually rebels against the Prolethean way of life. She marries Mark in an official ceremony after running away from the Prolethean farm. (seasons 2–3, 5)
- Andrew Gillies as Ethan Duncan, the adoptive father of Rachel Duncan and one of the original geneticists of the cloning experiment. He expresses disappointment in how Rachel turned out after he faked his death and left her to be raised by Aldous Leekie. (seasons 2–3)
- Amanda Brugel as Marci Coates, a woman against whom Alison is running in Bailey Downes's school trustee election. (season 3)
- Kyra Harper as Virginia Coady, a military doctor who is investigating the Castor sickness and illegally sterilizing ordinary women in order to gather data (seasons 3, 5)
- James Frain as Ferdinand Chevalier, a cleaner for Topside who sides with Sarah against Neolution in the fourth season, becoming her major Dyad ally. He was, in the comic book series, apparently in a sexual relationship with Rachel Duncan and spearheaded the Helsinki extermination. Later, in season 4, he meets Veera Suominen, a survivor of Helsinki who resents him for his murder of her closest friend, Niki. Veera leads him into a trap in an attempt to kill him but instead takes $3.7 million from his bank account and flees, leaving him strapped to a bomb after Sarah urges her not to kill him because he is seen to be a powerful ally for the clones. Mrs. S defuses the bomb, and Sarah sets him free, only for him to take Mrs. S and her daughter Kira hostage at Rachel's behest. (seasons 3–5)
- Ksenia Solo as Shay Davydov, a holistic healer whom Cosima meets through a dating app called Sapphire. Delphine begins spying on the relationship, taking photographs and video footage of the two individuals during their dates (season 3)
- Justin Chatwin as Jason Kellerman, Alison's ex-boyfriend from high school and now hers and Donnie's new boss and supplier in the drug trade (season 3)
- Alison Steadman as Kendall Malone, the original genetic subject that both the Leda and Castor factions were cloned from due to her being a chimera, an individual with both male and female DNA. She is revealed to be Mrs. S's biological mother and the one who murdered Mrs. S's husband John decades earlier. She is tracked down by the Leda clones through Ethan Duncan's encoded edition of The Island of Doctor Moreau, translated by Rachel. Despite Cosima's attempts at creating a gene therapy for the Leda disease with her blood, Kendall was shot and incinerated by Detective Duko on the orders of Evie Cho. (seasons 3–4)
- Calwyn Shurgold as Hell Wizard, owner of the comic book store (seasons 3–5)
- Rosemary Dunsmore as Susan Duncan, Rachel's adoptive mother and one of the original geneticists of the Leda and Castor cloning experiments, having faked her death the same way her partner Ethan Duncan had; like him, she is disappointed in the way Rachel has turned out, despite her abandonment of her daughter and the resulting isolation and purely clinical upbringing of Rachel by Aldous Leekie. (seasons 3–5)
- Gord Rand as Marty Duko, a detective at Beth's precinct who represents the police union in the investigation of her shooting of Maggie Chen; he was one of the contributing factors in Beth's suicide and is also associated with Neolution. (season 4)
- Jessalyn Wanlim as Evie Cho, a woman who works under Dr. Leekie at the Dyad Institute, specializing in Neolution. She is the CEO of the BrightBorn corporation, a Neolution-driven fertility company with dubious intentions. (season 4)
- Lauren Hammersley as Adele, Felix's biological half-sister (seasons 4–5)
- Jenessa Grant as Mud, an all-knowing girl at Camp Revival (season 5)
- Elyse Levesque as Maddy Enger, a Neolutionist working as a detective whose latest assignment is as Art's partner (season 5)
- Stephen McHattie as P.T. "Percival" Westmorland, the head of the Neolutionist project. Supposedly born in 1842, he is educated at Eton and Cambridge. He was a member of the Royal Geographic Society where he published a number of papers on reproduction. He also studied primitive societies, having gone into the bushes of Borneo in 1898 when he was thought to have died, never having been seen again in public. (season 5)

=== Acting doubles ===
- Kathryn Alexandre serves as Tatiana Maslany's acting double for the Project Leda clones throughout the whole series. However, she was not credited in the episodes in the first season. She also played Alexis, a minor character, in three episodes.
- Nick Abraham serves as Ari Millen's acting double for the Project Castor clones

=== Known clones ===
By the end of the first season, ten clones of various nationalities and walks of life are revealed. Additional clones gradually emerge in the second season, including Jennifer, who died from the same respiratory illness that affected Katja and Cosima. In episode 8 of season 2, Tony, a transgender clone, is introduced. In the season one finale, Cosima discovers each clone has a different DNA tag based on ASCII coded basepairs. In addition to the identification code is the text "THIS ORGANISM AND DERIVATIVE GENETIC MATERIAL IS RESTRICTED INTELLECTUAL PROPERTY" followed by a series of patent numbers. Sarah is given a photograph whose caption suggests that the cloning project that produced her was called "Project Leda". The season 2 finale introduced Charlotte, an eight-year-old clone with a leg disability.

It is also revealed that the military carried on with a male cloning initiative named Project Castor, which created Mark the Prolethean; Rudy, or "Scarface"; Miller the soldier; and Seth, the mustached clone. All the Project Castor clones are aware of their clone nature and were raised together by Dr. Virginia Coady in a military setting. The fourth episode of season 3 introduces the Castor clone Parsons, a victim of inhumane brain experiments. Sarah also discovered that Henrik Johanssen attempted to create a Castor clone from a stolen genetic sample but failed, resulting in the death of the infant Abel.

In the season 3 premiere, it is revealed that, in 2006, six self-aware Project Leda clones in the Helsinki area were executed. Comics depicting these events would later place it during 2001. It is also revealed that there is a non-self-aware clone named Krystal Goderitch who works as a manicurist. She is later featured in the eighth episode, in which an unnamed Polish clone is revealed to have recently died from a respiratory illness.

In the third episode of season 3, it is revealed that the original samples for Projects Castor and Leda were brother and sister, making all the clones genetic siblings. But the ninth episode of this season 3 shows even more similarity between the Castor and Leda genomes. A single woman, Kendall Malone, biological mother to Siobhan Sadler, is in fact the original of both clone lines by virtue of being a human chimera.

In August 2015, the conclusion of IDW's comic book tie-in to the show revealed another self-aware clone: Veera Suominen. She was thought to be one of the clones executed in Helsinki but survived. The subsequent comic titled Orphan Black: Helsinki, published November 2015, expands on her character.

The fourth season introduces two new Leda clones and one new Castor clone. The mysterious Leda clone known as "M.K." who wears a sheep mask is later confirmed as Veera Suominen; it is revealed that she is set on exacting revenge on Ferdinand Chevalier for the murder of her sister clone and only friend, Niki Lintula. The Castor clone, Ira, is very different from his brothers due to not being raised with the same military background and savage mindset of the other Castor men.

During the series finale, Camilla Torres, a Colombian Leda who is receiving the cure, is introduced. It is revealed that there are 274 Leda clones in total.

== Production ==
Bell Media announced on June 12, 2012, that they had commissioned a 10-episode season of Orphan Black that would be produced by Temple Street Productions and distributed internationally by BBC Worldwide. The show is executive produced by writer Graeme Manson, director John Fawcett, and Temple Street co-presidents Ivan Schneeberg and David Fortier. Co-executive producers are Karen Walton and Kerry Appleyard, while the Temple Street producers are Claire Welland and Karen Troubetskoy.

On June 26, 2012, BBC America announced that they had picked up the show in the US. Though Canadian actor Elliot Page was considered for the lead role, the casting eventually went to another Canadian, Tatiana Maslany. The lead was announced on September 17, 2012. The rest of the principal cast was announced in late October 2012 as production began in Toronto for the first season. On February 7, 2013, it was announced that Matt Frewer had been cast as an edgy philosophical professor, Dr. Leekie, and Evelyne Brochu was cast as a graduate student in molecular and cellular biology.

The show was renewed for a second season of 10 episodes on May 2, 2013, and premiered on April 19, 2014. Season 2 features several new recurring characters, including: Cal Morrison, one of Sarah's past lovers, played by Michiel Huisman; Henrik "Hank" Johanssen, a Prolethean religious leader who opposes the clone science, played by Peter Outerbridge; Mark, one of Johannsen's most devout followers, played by Ari Millen; and Marion Bowles, Rachel's boss at the Dyad Institute, played by Michelle Forbes. Patrick J. Adams guest stars in season 2, episode 6 and in the season 3 finale, portraying the character Jesse, a regular guy who becomes the love interest of one of the clones – Helena.

In March 2014, BBC Worldwide North America signed a deal with Amazon.com for exclusive streaming rights to the series on Amazon Prime Instant Video. The show's "binge-worthy" quality was cited as a major reason for Amazon's interest. In April 2014, the show's second-season premiere scored a 91% rise in viewership from the 18- to 49-year-old demographic through DVR playback, the largest for any cable drama premiere that season.

In April 2014, writer Stephen Hendricks filed a lawsuit against BBC and Temple Street for $5 million, alleging that they had stolen the idea for Orphan Black from a screenplay he had written in the late 1990s called Double Double. He had submitted this screenplay to Temple Street in 2004, where it went into review and was ultimately rejected. The suit was filed in United States District Court in California.

A third 10-episode season was announced on July 9, 2014, which began production in fall 2014. In November 2014, several new cast members for season 3 were announced, including James Frain as Ferdinand, a ruthless "cleaner"; Ksenia Solo as Shay, a holistic healer; Kyra Harper as Dr. Coady, a military doctor; Earl Pastko as Bulldog, Ferdinand's bodyguard; and Justin Chatwin as Jason Kellerman, a drug dealer. Ari Millen, who portrays Mark Rollins and other Project Castor clones, was promoted to the regular cast for season 3.

A 10-episode fourth season of the show was green-lighted and officially announced on May 7, 2015. Filming for season 4 began in September 2015, and Joel Thomas Hynes was announced as having been cast as Dizzy, a self-reliant hacker. In February 2016, Jessalyn Wanlim was announced as having been cast as Evie Cho, a seductive bio-engineer and advocate of women's health.

A fifth and final season consisting of 10 episodes was announced on June 6, 2016. Filming began in October 2016. Several new castings for the fifth season include: Stephen McHattie as Neolution founder P.T. Westmorland; Elyse Levesque as Detective Engers, a dirty cop associated with Neolution; Simu Liu as Mr. Mitchell, Kira's teacher; Andrew Moodie as Mr. Frontenac, Rachel's mysterious new consultant; and Jenessa Grant as Mud, an eclectic islander.

=== Filming ===
In scenes in which Tatiana Maslany has multiple parts, the production films the scene multiple times with dolly-mounted motion control cameras that replicate the movement between each shot. This apparatus, the Technodolly, is referred to as the "Time Vampire" on the Orphan Black set due to the amount of time multiple clone scenes take from the production schedule. In these scenes, Maslany first acts the scene with her acting double Kathryn Alexandre in the alternate clone role, then alone in the same clone role, then alone in the alternate clone, and then a fourth time with the scene filmed with just the camera motion for a background plate. Suspended tennis balls help Maslany retain the proper eyelines. In postproduction, Alexandre and the tennis balls are replaced with the images of Maslany from the alternate shots, thereby allowing for more action in scenes where she interacts with herself. In the season 2 finale, when a dance party scene called for the presence of four different clones, two days of shooting and several additional body doubles were used to create the effect, and postproduction work from Geoff Scott and his team at Intelligent Creatures VFX is rumored to have taken hundreds of hours to complete.

Alexandre's performances were central to Maslany's ability to create the characters. Maslany said, of Alexandre, "She's so amazing. She memorizes all of the lines, all of my blocking, all of her blocking, my mannerisms, my impulses; she, somehow, memorizes all of that and gives it back to me with a performance I can play off of." Alexandre had worked as a reader for auditioning actors in the casting stages of Orphan Black's initial production. She auditioned for the role of Maslany's double and earned the spot because the producers were in search of, in Alexandre's words, "an actor as opposed to just a double". Nick Abraham served a similar role as an acting double for Ari Millen's portrayal of the Castor clones.

Maslany created different music playlists to help distinguish between the many clone personalities she portrays. She also used dance to develop the physicality of the characters, including their postures, gestures, and movements, and relied on her background in improv to develop the characters more fully.

The character of Cosima is named after science historian Cosima Herter, a friend of showrunner Graeme Manson, who serves as the show's science consultant. Herter works with the writers to ensure the plausibility of cloning and other scientific aspects of the series, as well as the complexity of philosophical and ethical concerns the show raises. She also answers fan questions about the show's science in the writer's room blog known as "The Hive". Makeup artist Stephen Lynch, hair stylist Sandy Sokolowski, and wardrobe department head Debra Hanson are instrumental in creating the visual differences necessary to distinguish each clone, often using these to develop the characters' personalities before any lines of dialogue are written for them. Art drawn by Sarah's daughter, Kira, in the show is created by art department member Sash Kosovic.

=== Location ===
Orphan Black was shot on location in Toronto, Ontario. The show was vague about whether it was set in Canada. Graeme Manson said, in 2014, that the setting is deliberately ambiguous. "It's meant to be Generica. It's part of the price you pay for this kind of co-production." John Fawcett concurred, arguing that "To be honest, we don't want to say we're American and alienate the Canadians, or say we're Canadian and alienate the Americans. The bottom line is we're one big happy family. We're just a little bit further North than you." Grantland's Tara Ariano argued that this ambiguity is "a daring new way for a producer to work within CanCon strictures: Set your show in Canada (technically), employ a Canadian crew, run it on a Canadian channel...and make room for recurring guest stars like Maria Doyle Kennedy...by casting one Canadian to play close to a dozen roles." In a season 5 episode, Felix specifically identifies Canada as the location.

Before this, the Canadian filming location was apparent from details such as cars with Ontario licence plates, Beth's and Mrs. S's Ontario driving licences, the currency that is used, scripted references to the suburb of Scarborough, Ontario and to Parkdale, Toronto, and a plane ticket in the pilot episode identifying Toronto Pearson International Airport. Toronto's Bridgepoint Health and Don Jail are stand-ins for the exterior of the "Dyad Institute". Scenes set in the Scarborough suburb where Alison lives are actually filmed in Markham, Ontario, a suburb immediately north of Scarborough. However, details are often deliberately obscured; American pronunciations of words like "lieutenant" are used.

The co-production also influenced another important aspect of the show: Sarah's British accent and background. John Fawcett explained that BBC America asked them to make the lead character British, which she was not originally, to better fit the BBC brand. Fawcett, however, saw this directive as an advantage, as it allowed for an easy differentiation of Sarah from the other clones and a broadening of the geographical scope of the show's plot.

== Episodes ==
Orphan Black seasons
Season	Episodes	Originally released	
Season	Episodes	First released	Last released
1	10	March 30, 2013	June 1, 2013
2	10	April 19, 2014	June 21, 2014
3	10	April 18, 2015	June 20, 2015
4	10	April 14, 2016	June 16, 2016
5	10	June 10, 2017	August 12, 2017

== Reception ==
=== Critical response ===
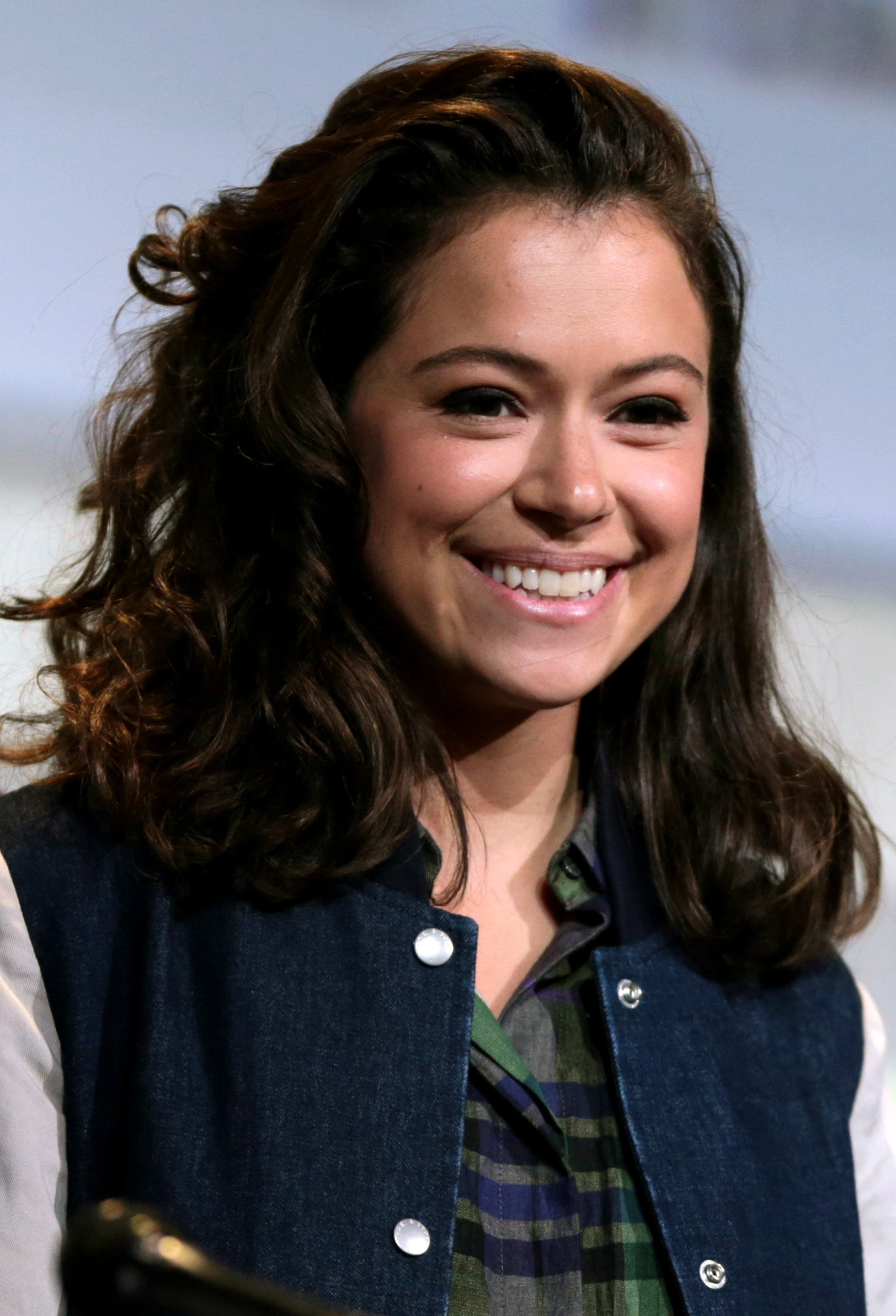
Tatiana Maslany garnered widespread critical acclaim for her portrayals of several different characters who are clones.

==== Season 1 ====
The series received generally positive reviews, with the first season scoring a 73 out of 100 on Metacritic based on reviews from 20 critics. On Rotten Tomatoes, it received a 94% approval rating from critics, with an average score of 8 out of 10 based on 34 reviews. The site's consensus reads: "Orphan Black is a wild science fiction ride that incorporates dramatic sensibilities which can turn from suspenseful to light at a moment's notice." Tatiana Maslany received acclaim for her performance as the various clones. Tim Goodman of The Hollywood Reporter called her performances "fantastic".

==== Season 2 ====
Orphan Black continued to receive very positive reviews from critics, with the second season scoring 79 out of 100 on Metacritic, based on reviews from 26 critics. On Rotten Tomatoes, it received a 98% approval rating from critics, with a rating average of 8.3 out of 10, based on reviews from 40 critics. The critical consensus reads: "Anchored by Tatiana Maslany's brilliant multi-role performance, Orphan Black is as densely-layered, thought-provoking, and wildly entertaining as ever." Mary McNamara of The Los Angeles Times wrote that "Beneath the twists and turns ... lie the even more basic theme of revelation: How would you react if you discovered that what you had come to know as your life was based on misinformation." Alan Sepinwall of HitFix praised the show, calling it "a good, solid show that understands its strengths and keeps playing to them in season 2."

When Maslany again failed to receive an Emmy nomination for her work on the series, critics and fans derided it as a snub.

==== Season 3 ====
The third season received generally positive reviews from critics. On Metacritic, the season has a score of 70 out of 100 based on 12 reviews. On Rotten Tomatoes, it holds an 83% approval rating based on 145 reviews, with rating averages of 7.75 out of 10. The critical consensus reads: "Season three of Orphan Black lures viewers into an expanded series mythology while continuing to highlight Tatiana Maslany's multiple standout performances."

==== Season 4 ====
The fourth season received very positive reviews from critics. On Metacritic, the season has a score of 80 out of 100 based on 5 reviews. On Rotten Tomatoes, it holds a 97% approval rating based on 110 reviews, with a rating average of 8.25 out of 10. The critical consensus reads: "Orphan Black makes a 180-degree return to its roots with an experimental fourth season that delves deeper into the show's strange, innovative premise."

==== Season 5 ====
The fifth season received acclaim from critics. On Metacritic, the season has a score of 83 out of 100 based on 7 reviews, indicating "universal acclaim". On Rotten Tomatoes, it holds a 95% approval rating from critics, with a rating average of 8.3 out of 10 based on 119 reviews. The critical consensus reads: "Orphan Black's final season solidifies its standing as a classic science fiction television show – and offers yet another persuasive showcase for Tatiana Maslany's dramatic prowess."

=== Awards and accolades ===
Maslany's failure to receive a nomination for Outstanding Lead Actress in a Drama Series at both the 65th Primetime Emmy Awards and 66th Primetime Emmy Awards was seen as a snub by critics and received significant media exposure and criticism. Tim Goodman of The Hollywood Reporter called it an "outrageous oversight". However, Maslany received a nomination for Outstanding Lead Actress in a Drama Series in 2015 and won the category in 2016. In 2018, Maslany received another nomination for the final season of the series. Maslany has also received several other accolades for her performance, including two Critics' Choice Television Awards and one further nomination, one TCA Award and one further nomination, four Satellite Award nominations, and one Golden Globe Award and Screen Actors Guild Award nomination.

The series won a Peabody Award in 2013, and has won and been nominated for several Canadian Screen Awards.

=== #CloneClub ===
The series is also known for its fan base across social media platforms who identify as #CloneClub.

=== Board games ===
The series was praised for portraying modern strategic board games as part of the plot (an idea of co-creator and board game enthusiast John Fawcett). These include Runewars, Agricola, Descent: Journeys in the Dark, Dead of Winter, Gloomhaven and Scythe.

== Broadcast ==
In Canada, the series originally aired on Space, and made its broadcast network television debut on CTV on August 16, 2013. In the US, it aired on BBC America. It began airing in the UK on September 20, 2013, on BBC Three, with season 2 debuting on April 30, 2014. Netflix picked up the broadcast rights in the UK and Ireland for season 4 onwards. It premiered in Australia on January 14, 2014, on SBS2.

== Other media ==
=== Comic books ===
In July 2014, it was announced that a comic book series published by IDW Publishing would begin in early 2015. The first issue was released in February 2015, and the comic book series is co-written by series creators John Fawcett and Graeme Manson.

=== Soundtracks ===
In May 2015, two soundtracks were released by Varèse Sarabande Records featuring music from seasons 1 and 2. The score includes music composed by Trevor Yuile and the soundtrack includes the music featured in Orphan Black by other artists.

=== Audio series ===
In June 2019, a 10-episode audio series titled Orphan Black: The Next Chapter was announced, with Tatiana Maslany reprising her role as the Project Leda clones. Serving as an official continuation of the series, it is set eight years after the series finale. Malka Older serves as the showrunner with Mishell Baker, Lindsay Smith, Heli Kennedy, Madeline Ashby and E.C. Myers as writers. The series is released through the platform Serial Box and the first episode was made available on September 12, 2019. A second season premiered in October 2021, co-produced by Realm and AMC Networks, adding original cast members Jordan Gavaris, Kristian Bruun and Evelyne Brochu to the cast.

=== Japanese remake ===
A Japanese remake of the show, Orphan Black – 7 Genes, launched December 2, 2017, on Fuji Television, starring South Korean actress and singer Kang Ji-young as Sara Aoyama, a broke and desperate single mother who witnesses the shocking suicide of a woman who looks just like her. The remake was produced by Telepack for Tokai TV under licence from BBC Worldwide.

=== Spin-off ===
In March 2019, it was reported that a new series set in the Orphan Black universe was in early development stages at AMC, to be produced by Temple Street Productions. In February 2022, it was announced that Anna Fishko would be the writer of the show and that the series would follow a new story set in the same world as Orphan Black. In April 2022, the series was greenlit and titled Orphan Black: Echoes. In July 2022, Krysten Ritter was cast in the lead role of Lucy. The series premiered in June 2024 on AMC, AMC+ and BBC America.
