= John Fawcett (director) =

Canadian film and television director

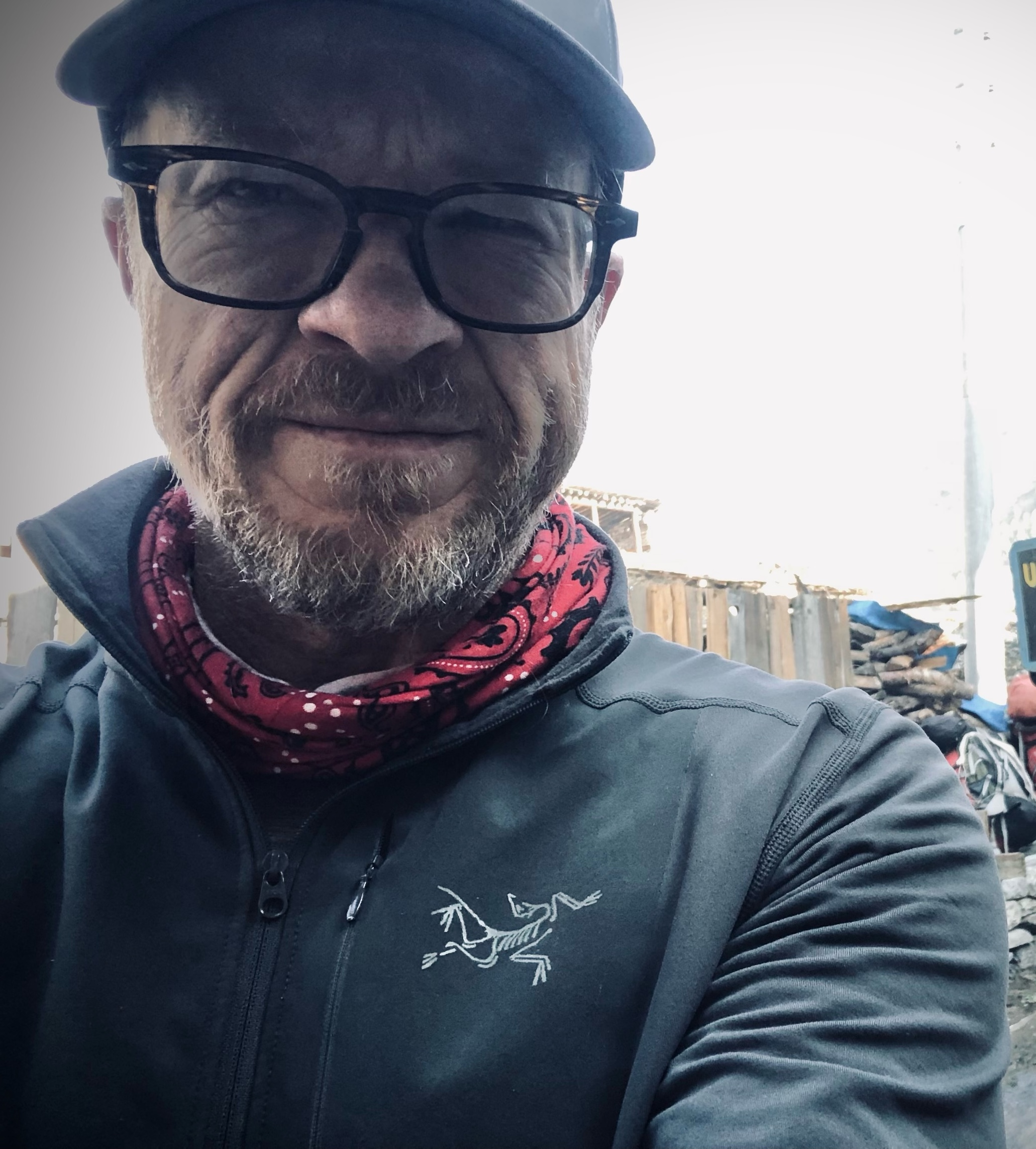
- Fawcett in 2022
- Born: March 5, 1968 (age 58)
- Occupations: Director, writer, producer
- Known for: Orphan Black, Ginger Snaps, The Dark, The Man in the High Castle, The Boys Club

John Fawcett (born March 5, 1968) is a Canadian director, writer, and producer of film and television. Alongside Graeme Manson, he co-created and is a director for the award-winning Temple Street Productions television series Orphan Black.

== Career ==
Fawcett began his career making commercials before moving on to direct music videos for bands including Cowboy Junkies, Lori Yates, and Jeff Healey. He then directed two award-winning short films Half Nelson in 1991 and Scratch Ticket in 1994. In 1996, he debuted his first feature film The Boys Club, which was nominated for five Genie Awards, including Best Direction. Fawcett's other best-known films are the 2000 werewolf movie Ginger Snaps and the 2005 horror film The Dark.

Alongside Graeme Manson, he co-created and is a director for the award-winning BBC America and Space sci-fi television series Orphan Black. The two previously had collaborated on the 2001 film Lucky Girl. The series was a success critically and commercially. It premiered on March 30, 2013, on Space in Canada and on BBC America in the United States. On June 16, 2016, the series was renewed for a fifth and final, which premiered on June 10, 2017. The series won a Peabody Award in 2013, and has won and been nominated for several Canadian Screen Awards. Fawcett also received the Hugo Award for Best Dramatic Presentation (Short Form) in 2015 for his direction of the show's second season finale, "By Means Which Have Never Yet Been Tried".

With Graeme Manson, he received the 2015 CFC Award for Creative Excellence from the Canadian Film Centre for his work on Orphan Black.

Most of his other work has been for television; he has directed episodes of many series, including Xena: Warrior Princess, Da Vinci's Inquest, Queer as Folk, Blade: The Series, Being Erica, Lost Girl, and Titans.

== Selected filmography ==
Year	Title	Director	Writer	Producer	Notes	Ref.
1996	The Boys Club	Yes	No	No		
2000	Ginger Snaps	Yes	Yes	No	Co-written with Karen Walton	
2001	Lucky Girl	Yes	No	No	Television film	
2005	The Dark	Yes	No	No		
2006	Last Exit	Yes	No	No		
