= Graeme Manson =

Canadian screenwriter and producer

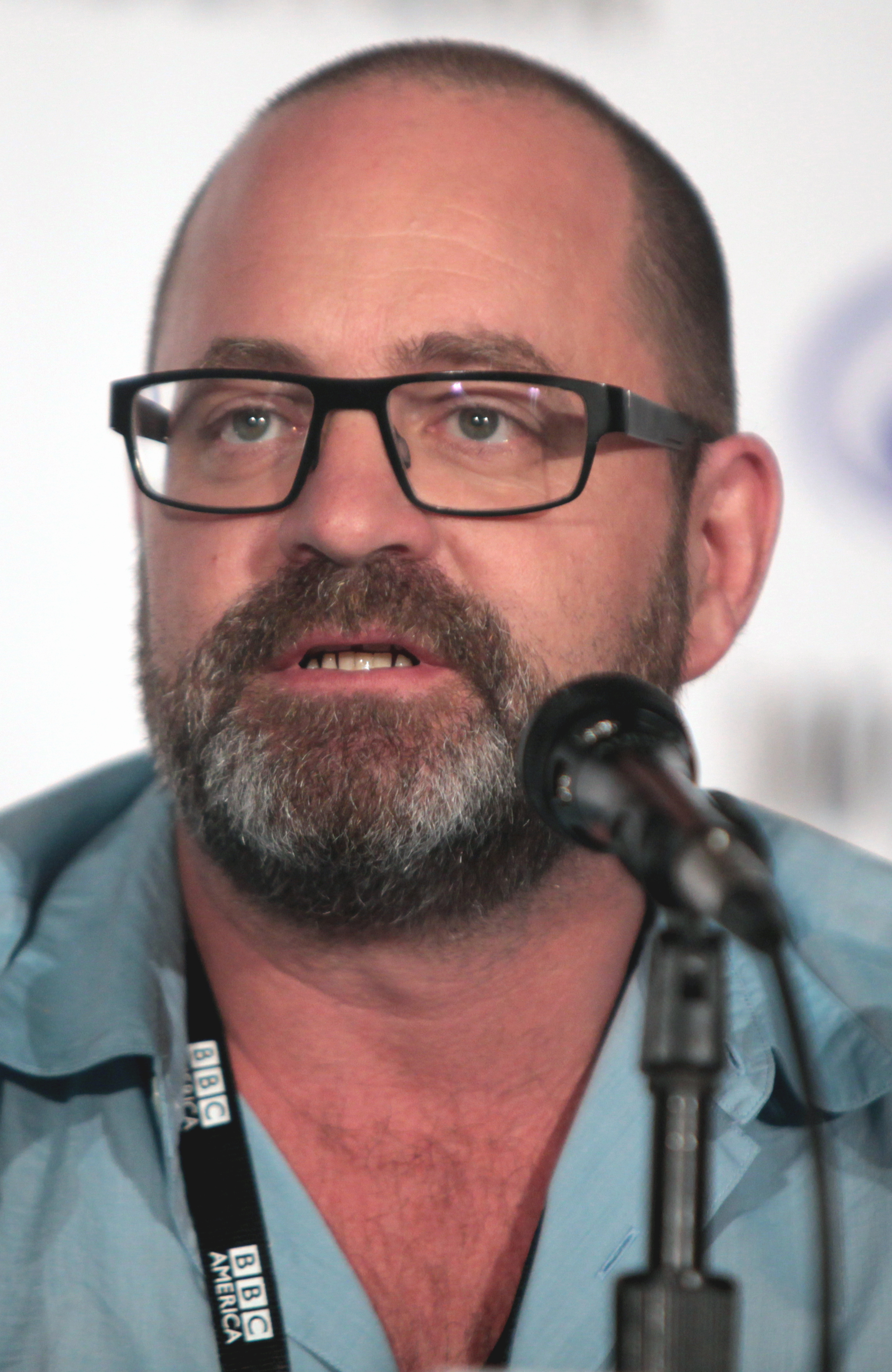
- Manson at the 2016 WonderCon
- Born: 20th century Canada
- Occupations: Screenwriter, producer
- Known for: Orphan Black

Graeme Manson (born 20th century) is a Canadian screenwriter and producer from Vancouver, British Columbia. He is known for his work on the Space and BBC America science fiction thriller television series Orphan Black.

== Career ==
He co-wrote the 1997 film Cube and has written for television for several years since, including The Bridge, Flashpoint, and Being Erica.

With John Fawcett, he is the co-creator and executive producer of the award-winning BBC America and Space science fiction thriller television series Orphan Black, for which he also has written many episodes. The two previously had collaborated on the 2001 film Lucky Girl. The series was a success critically and commercially. It premiered on March 30, 2013, on Space in Canada and on BBC America in the United States. On June 16, 2016, the series was renewed for a fifth and final 10-episode season, which premiered on June 10, 2017. The series won a Peabody Award in 2013, and has won and been nominated for several Canadian Screen Awards.

He will be the executive producer for the upcoming television adaptation of Whatever, Linda, an award-winning web series.

He served as the co-showrunner of the American post-apocalyptic dystopian thriller television series Snowpiercer, which aired from 2020 to 2024.

== Awards ==
With John Fawcett, he received the 2015 CFC Award for Creative Excellence from the Canadian Film Centre for his work on Orphan Black. He has also won three Canadian Screen Awards, a Hugo Award, and a Writers Guild of Canada award.
