= Grinch (disambiguation) =

The Grinch is a fictional character created by Dr. Seuss.

Grinch may also refer to:

Media

- How the Grinch Stole Christmas!, the book by Dr. Seuss
- How the Grinch Stole Christmas! (TV special), a 1966 CBS production
- How the Grinch Stole Christmas (2000 film), a live action film
- The Grinch (video game), a 2000 video game
- The Grinch (film), a 2018 animated film
- Alex Grinch (born 1980), American football coach
- The Grinch, song by Trippie Red on his mixtape A Love Letter to You 4

== See also ==
- Gringe
