= How the Grinch Stole Christmas (disambiguation) =

How the Grinch Stole Christmas! is a 1957 book by Dr. Seuss.

How the Grinch Stole Christmas may also refer to:

- How the Grinch Stole Christmas! (TV special), a 1966 animated special
- How the Grinch Stole Christmas (2000 film), a film starring Jim Carrey
- Dr. Seuss' How the Grinch Stole Christmas! The Musical
- Dr. Seuss: How the Grinch Stole Christmas!, 2007 Nintendo DS video game adaptation

== See also ==
- The Grinch (film), an animated film adaptation of the book starring Benedict Cumberbatch
