= Dr. Seuss' The Grinch Musical Live! =

- Genre: Holiday; Musical
- Based on: Dr. Seuss' How the Grinch Stole Christmas! The Musical by Timothy Mason Mel Marvin; How the Grinch Stole Christmas! by Dr. Seuss
- Written by: Simon Nye
- Directed by: Max Webster; Julia Knowles
- Starring: Matthew Morrison; Denis O'Hare; Booboo Stewart; Amelia Minto
- Composers: Timothy Mason; Albert Hague; Dr. Seuss
- Country of origin: United States
- Original language: English

Production
- Executive producers: Lee Connolly; Simon Friend; Joshua Rosenblum; James Sanna
- Producer: Matthew Morrison
- Production location: Troubadour Theater
- Camera setup: Multi-camera
- Running time: 120 mins (estimated)
- Production companies: Dr. Seuss Enterprises; Running Subway; Penny Lane Entertainment Television; Simon Friend Entertainment

Original release
- Network: NBC
- Release: December 9, 2020

Related
- Jesus Christ Superstar Live in Concert; Annie Live!

Dr. Seuss' The Grinch Musical is an American Christmas musical television special that aired on NBC on December 9, 2020. It is a performance of an adaptation of the 2006 musical Dr. Seuss' How the Grinch Stole Christmas! The Musical, which is based on the 1957 book How the Grinch Stole Christmas! by Dr. Seuss. It was filmed at the Troubadour Theatre in London. The special stars Matthew Morrison as the titular character, Denis O'Hare and Booboo Stewart as Max the dog, and Amelia Minto as Cindy-Lou Who.

== Premise ==
The Grinch's dog Max narrates how his old master (Matthew Morrison) once schemed to ruin the festive holiday for the citizens of Whoville.

== Cast and characters ==
- Matthew Morrison as The Grinch
- Amelia Minto as Cindy-Lou Who
- Denis O'Hare as Old Max
  - Booboo Stewart as Young Max
- Claire Machin as Grandma Who
- Amy Ellen Richardson as Mrs. Who
- Ako Mitchell as Mr. Who
- Gary Wilmot as Grandpa Who
- Alfie Murray as Boo Who

== Musical numbers ==
- "Who Likes Christmas?" – Citizens of Whoville
- "This Time of Year" – Old Max and Young Max
- "I Hate Christmas Eve" – The Grinch
- "Whatchama Who" – The Grinch
- "Welcome, Christmas" – Citizens of Whoville
- "I Hate Christmas Eve (Reprise)" – The Grinch
- "It's the Thought That Counts" – Citizens of Whoville
- "One of a Kind" – The Grinch
- "Now's the Time" – Mr. Who, Mrs. Who, Grandma Who, Grandpa Who
- "You're a Mean One, Mr. Grinch" – Old Max, Young Max, and The Grinch
- "Santa for a Day" – Cindy-Lou Who and The Grinch
- "You're a Mean One, Mr. Grinch (Reprise)" – Old Max
- "Where Are You Christmas?" – Cindy-Lou Who
- "Who Likes Christmas? (Reprise)" – Citizens of Whoville
- "One of a Kind (Reprise)" – Young Max, The Grinch, Cindy-Lou Who
- "This Time of Year (Reprise)" – Old Max
- "Welcome, Christmas (Reprise)" – Citizens of Whoville
- "Santa for a Day (Reprise)" – Ensemble
- "Who Likes Christmas? (Reprise)" – Ensemble

== Production ==
=== Development ===
In November 2020, TODAY.com reported that another musical special would be released by NBC. The last special, Jesus Christ Superstar Live in Concert aired live in 2018 and no live special was released in 2019. Before that, NBC had also released The Sound of Music Live!, Peter Pan Live!, The Wiz Live!, and Hairspray Live!. Unlike the previous specials, this one would not be live, but rather pre-recorded over 2 days. Morrison said that the special was originally intended to be live, but due to COVID protocols, it was too impossible to do it live. The program was directed for the stage by Max Webster and directed for the screen by Julia Knowles. The screenplay was adapted by Simon Nye. The program featured music by Timothy Mason and Mel Marvin. It also featured two songs written by Albert Hague and Dr. Seuss that were featured in the first television adaptation of the children's book, How the Grinch Stole Christmas! The special was produced by Morrison, who played the lead role, and executive produced by Lee Connolly, Simon Friend, Joshua Rosenblum, and James Sanna. The project was overseen by Doug Vaughan, executive vice president of special programs at NBC Entertainment.

=== Release ===
The special aired on December 9, 2020, at 8 p.m. EST on NBC.

== Reception ==
The special received poor reviews.

Caroline Siede of The A.V. Club gave it a "C", mainly criticizing Morrison's performance as the Grinch, as well as the source material, saying the music writing "makes Seussical look like a masterpiece in comparison". Brian Lowry of CNN stated that "the show felt bloated and flat" with all of the commercial breaks. Kelly Lawler of USA Today gave the presentation only one star out of a possible four, calling it the worst of all the previous adaptations of the story.

The special received a 0.6 rating among the 18–49 demographic and 2.5 million viewers, and was beaten by The Masked Singer Holiday Sing-A-Long special.

== See also ==
- List of Christmas films
