= Grinch =

Fictional character created by Dr. Seuss

The Grinch
- Grinch character
- The Grinch with his pet dog Max.
- First appearance: How the Grinch Stole Christmas! (1957)
- Created by: Dr. Seuss
- Designed by: Dr. Seuss
- Portrayed by: Guy Paul (Dr. Seuss' How the Grinch Stole Christmas!); Jim Carrey (How the Grinch Stole Christmas); Patrick Page (Dr. Seuss' How the Grinch Stole Christmas!); Stefán Karl Stefánsson (Dr. Seuss' How the Grinch Stole Christmas!); Reed Sigmund (How the Grinch Stole Christmas! at Children's Theatre Company); Jeff McCarthy; (Dr. Seuss' How the Grinch Stole Christmas!); Matthew Morrison (Dr. Seuss' The Grinch Musical Live!); Walton Goggins (Walmart commercials)
- Voiced by: Boris Karloff (How the Grinch Stole Christmas!); Zero Mostel (audio record); Hans Conried (Halloween is Grinch Night); Bob Holt (The Grinch Grinches the Cat in the Hat); Walter Matthau (Random House Home Video); Anthony Asbury (The Wubbulous World of Dr. Seuss); Corey Burton (Sneech Beach Area, Seuss Landing Street Show); Josh Gerhardt (The Grinch); Rik Mayall (The Dr. Seuss Collection); Chris Cox (Horton and the Kwuggerbug and More Lost Stories audiobook); Benedict Cumberbatch (The Grinch); David Kaye (Capital One commercials); Darin De Paul (Walmart commercials)

In-universe information
- Gender: Male
- Family: Max (pet dog)
- Spouse: Martha May Whovier (How the Grinch Stole Christmas)
- Home: Whoville

The Grinch is a character created by children's author and cartoonist Dr. Seuss. He is best known as the titular main protagonist of the 1957 children's book How the Grinch Stole Christmas! He has been portrayed and voiced by many actors, including Boris Karloff, Zero Mostel, Hans Conried, Bob Holt, Walter Matthau, Anthony Asbury, Jim Carrey, Rik Mayall, Benedict Cumberbatch, Matthew Morrison, David Howard Thornton, and James Austin Johnson.

== Character description ==
The Grinch is depicted as a furry, pot-bellied, pear-shaped, snub-nosed humanoid creature with a cat-like face and a cynical personality. While he was black and white in the original book, he is typically colored green in full-color adaptations. He has spent the past 53 years living in seclusion on a cliff overlooking the town of Whoville.

In contrast to the cheerful Whos, the Grinch is misanthropic, ill-natured, and mean-tempered. The reason for this is a source of speculation; the consensus among the Whos is that he was born with a heart that they say was "two sizes too small". Though always hateful, he especially hates the Christmas season, making particular note of how disturbing the various elements of Christmas time are to him, including the earsplitting noises of strangely-designed musical instruments, eating Christmas dinner, and singing Christmas carols. Unable to stand the holiday any longer, he enacts a dastardly plan to stop it from happening.

Aided by his pet dog, Max, he meticulously designs a red suit to disguise himself as Santa Claus and breaks into the Whos' homes on Christmas Eve while they sleep to steal everything they own, and dump it off from a nearby mountain. Although he pulls off the theft successfully, on Christmas morning he is shocked to hear the Whos still singing cheerfully, happy simply to have each other. He then realizes that the holiday has a deeper meaning that he never considered. Inspired, he stops the Whos' belongings from falling off the edge of the mountain, and in the process his heart grows three times its size. He returns all the gifts he stole and gladly takes part in the Whos' Christmas celebration.

The Grinch is still portrayed as a bitter and ill-tempered character in artwork and other media. In both the animated TV special and the 2000 live-action film, he is shown to have superhuman strength when he stops an entire sleigh loaded with presents from going over a cliff and lifts it over his head, and he is also described as "[finding] the strength of ten Grinches plus two" during that moment of crisis. In the 2018 film, the Grinch has assistance saving all the Whos' stolen goods.

With the character's anti-Christmas spirit followed by the transformation on Christmas morning, scholars have noted similarity to Ebenezer Scrooge from Charles Dickens' 1843 novella A Christmas Carol. Cardiologist David Kass suggested that the growth of the Grinch's heart at the end of the story indicates that the Grinch has the physiology of a Burmese python.

In Seuss' book, the Grinch's hatred for Christmas is unknown, but the 2000 film adaptation provides a backstory in his upbringing: abandoned in infancy in Whoville and left in the cold, unnoticed by the revelers at a Christmas party, the Grinch is taken in by two Who women. He proves an unruly schoolboy and is bullied by a schoolmate, Augustus May Who (later Whoville's mayor), but falls for a Who girl named Martha May Whovier. Determined to impress her, he uses various family heirlooms to make an angel Christmas tree-topper for a Christmas gift exchange and vainly attempts to shave. He is mocked for his efforts by everyone at school except Martha and so conceives an abiding resentment. The TV special The Grinch Grinches the Cat in the Hat lays much of the blame on the absence of the Grinch's mother, who had been a positive, nurturing influence on the Grinch in her lifetime but died some time prior; when the Grinch is finally provoked to grieve at the end of that special, he returns to being good.

== History ==
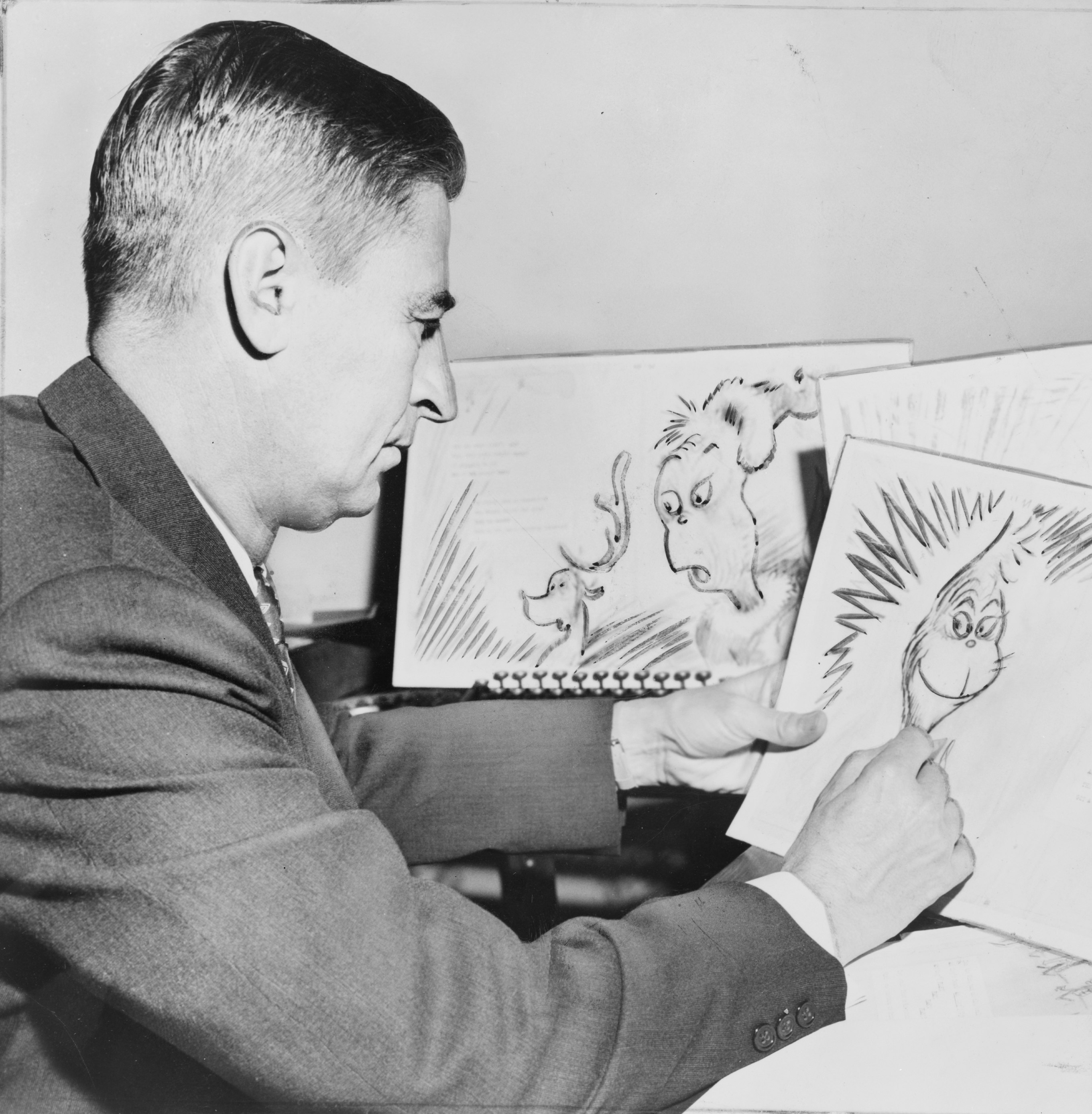
Dr. Seuss is working on How the Grinch Stole Christmas! in early 1957

The first use of the word 'Grinch' in a work by Dr. Seuss appears in the 1953 book Scrambled Eggs Super! (one of the books withdrawn from circulation by the Seuss estate in 2021) about Peter T. Hooper, a boy who collects eggs from a number of exotic birds to make scrambled eggs. One of these exotic birds is the "Beagle-Beaked-Bald-Headed Grinch" who shares the later Grinch's cantankerous attitude.

The name later appeared in the May 1955 issue of Redbook in a 32-line poem called, "The Hoobub and the Grinch". This version bears virtually no resemblance to the later character other than name, instead being a fast-talking salesman in the vein of Sylvester McMonkey McBean from The Sneetches and the Once-ler from Seuss's later book The Lorax. "The Hoobub and the Grinch" would be republished as part of the posthumous anthology Horton and the Kwuggerbug and More Lost Stories in 2014, in which the illustration draws this Grinch far differently.

The Grinch, in his best known incarnation, made his book debut in the 1957 story How the Grinch Stole Christmas!, written and illustrated by Dr. Seuss, published as both a Random House book and in an issue of Redbook magazine. In 1966, the story was adapted into an animated television featurette of the same name, which was directed by Chuck Jones and included the song "You're a Mean One, Mr. Grinch". Boris Karloff serves as both the story's narrator and the voice of the Grinch, but the song was sung by Thurl Ravenscroft, as Karloff could not sing. The Grinch's green color debuted in the television special as a consensus choice among Jones and Seuss, who agreed green was the only choice that made sense.

In 1977, Seuss responded to the fan request for more Grinch tales by writing the animated television special Halloween Is Grinch Night. The Grinch is voiced by Hans Conried. This was followed in 1982, when Marvel green-lit The Grinch Grinches the Cat in the Hat, a TV film co-starring The Cat in the Hat. The Grinch is voiced by Bob Holt. The special was produced by Dr. Seuss (though under his real name, Ted Geisel). Although not as successful as the original, the two films both received Emmy Awards.

Several episodes of the 1996 Nick Jr. Channel television show The Wubbulous World of Dr. Seuss feature the Grinch as the main antagonist, this time in puppet form. He was performed and voiced by Anthony Asbury from Season 1 (1996) to Season 2 (1998).

A 2000 live-action feature musical comedy film based on the story, directed by Ron Howard and starring Jim Carrey as the Grinch, was a major success at the box office. A video game based on the film, simply entitled The Grinch, was released on several consoles and PC in the same year. It was followed in 2007 by the release of the Nintendo DS title Dr. Seuss: How the Grinch Stole Christmas!.

The Grinch was portrayed on the stage when the story was turned into a 1994 musical by the Children's Theatre Company out of Minneapolis. The show made it to Broadway by way of a limited run in 2006. Icelandic actor Stefán Karl Stefánsson portrayed the Grinch in the touring production of the musical from 2008 to 2015. The Grinch is also a minor character in the 2000 musical Seussical, which is based on multiple Seuss works.

The Grinch's story was adapted for a 2018 animated film by Illumination Entertainment, starring Benedict Cumberbatch as the title character.

On December 9, 2020, NBC aired the holiday live production, Dr. Seuss' The Grinch Musical Live!, based on the Broadway stage musical. Booboo Stewart plays young Max, Amelia Minto plays Cindy Lou Who, Denis O'Hare plays old Max and Matthew Morrison stars as the Grinch. The musical includes songs from the original musical, such as "You're a Mean One, Mr. Grinch".

In 2023, Outright Games and Casual Brothers Ltd. developed and released a video game titled The Grinch: Christmas Adventures, in which you play as both the Grinch and his dog Max as they traverse through 18 levels in Whoville to steal Christmas presents from the Whos, including jigsaw puzzles in order to unlock upgrades.

== Voice actors and portrayals ==
Various iterations of the Grinch in other media.

In many different movies, specials, video games, commercials and television series, the Grinch has been voiced and played by many different actors throughout many films. In Chuck Jones' 1966 television special, the Grinch was voiced by Boris Karloff before he died three years later in 1969. Zero Mostel voiced the Grinch in the 1975 audio recording of How the Grinch Stole Christmas!, while Hans Conried voiced the character in Halloween Is Grinch Night and Bob Holt voiced the character in The Grinch Grinches the Cat in the Hat, a crossover with one of Dr. Seuss' characters The Cat in the Hat.

Walter Matthau voiced the character in Random House Home Video. The Wubbulous World of Dr. Seuss also features the Grinch, where he was played by puppeteer Anthony Asbury.

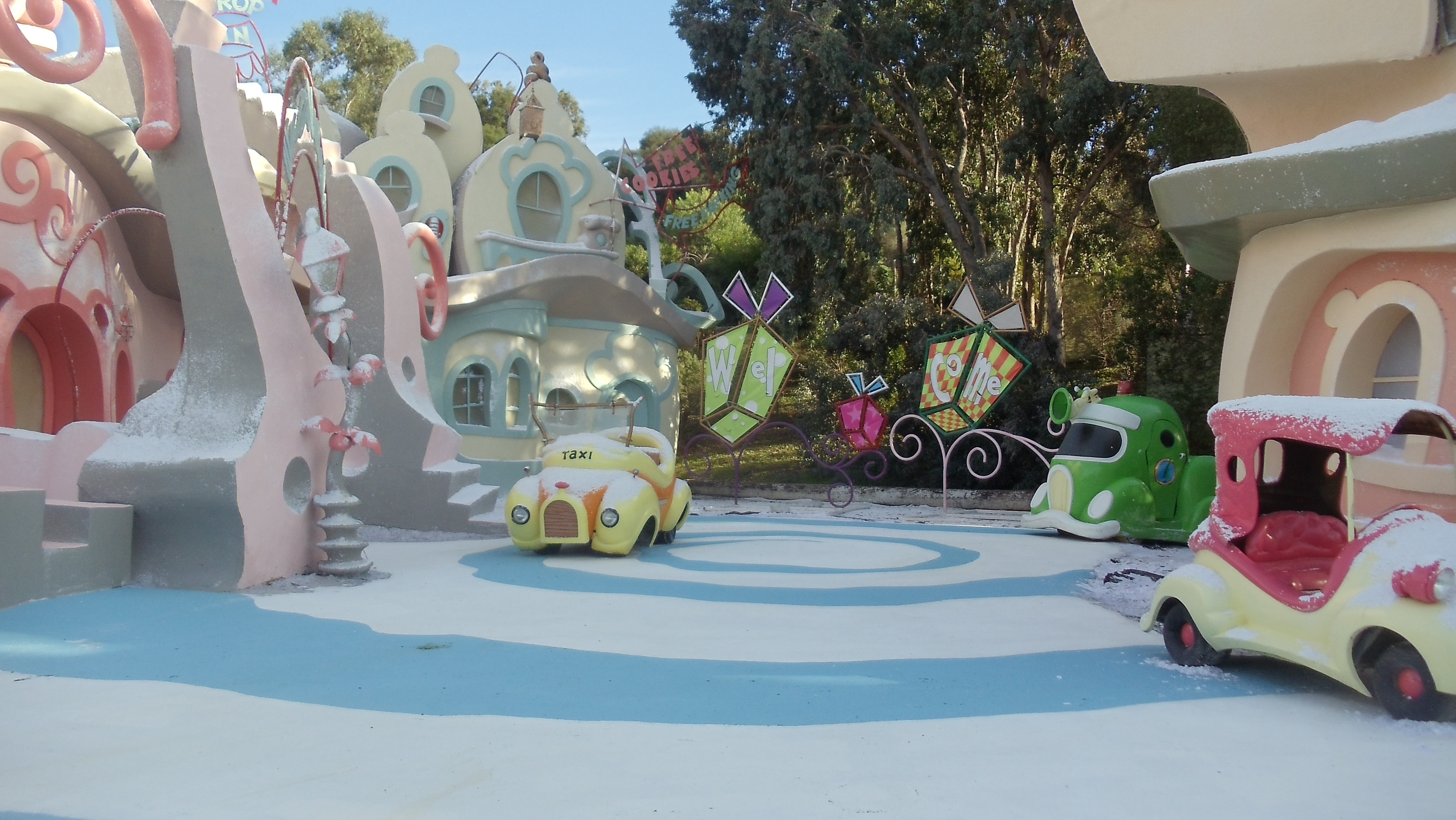
Set of the 2000 film How the Grinch Stole Christmas

The Grinch was voiced by Corey Burton in Seuss Landing and Sneech Beach Area. In Ron Howard's 2000 How the Grinch Stole Christmas film, the Grinch's first live-action feature, he was played by Jim Carrey. Despite the film having mixed reviews, Carrey's performance as the Grinch was praised by critics. In The Grinch video game, he was voiced by Josh Gerhardt. Rik Mayall Voiced The Character In The Dr Seuss Collection Audio CD. Stefán Karl Stefánsson played the character in Dr. Seuss' How the Grinch Stole Christmas! The Musical from 2008 to 2015.

In Universal Pictures and Illumination's feature film The Grinch directed by Scott Mosier and Yarrow Cheney, he was voiced by Benedict Cumberbatch. In the Grinch's third live-action feature, Dr. Seuss' The Grinch Musical Live!, he was played by Matthew Morrison. In the horror movie parody of the Grinch, The Mean One, the Grinch was played by David Howard Thornton. In some Capital One commercials, the Grinch was voiced by David Kaye. In some Walmart commercials, the Grinch was voiced by Darin De Paul and played by Walton Goggins.

- Boris Karloff (1966, 1994; archive recordings, uncredited; How the Grinch Stole Christmas!)
- Zero Mostel (1975; How the Grinch Stole Christmas!, audio record)
- Hans Conried (1977; Halloween Is Grinch Night)
- Bob Holt (1982; The Grinch Grinches the Cat in the Hat)
- Walter Matthau (1992; Random House Home Video)
- Anthony Asbury (1996–1998; The Wubbulous World of Dr. Seuss)
- Guy Paul (1998; Dr. Seuss' How the Grinch Stole Christmas!)
- Corey Burton (1999; Sneech Beach Area, Seuss Landing Street Show)
- Jim Carrey (2000; How the Grinch Stole Christmas)
- Josh Ryan Evans (2000; young Grinch in How the Grinch Stole Christmas)
- Josh Gerhardt (2000; The Grinch)
- Rik Mayall (2000; The Dr Seuss Collection, audio CD)
- Patrick Page (2006–2007; Dr. Seuss' How the Grinch Stole Christmas!)
- Jay Goede (2006; Dr. Seuss' How the Grinch Stole Christmas!)
- Stefán Karl Stefánsson (2008–2013, 2015; Dr. Seuss' How the Grinch Stole Christmas!)
- Jeff Skowron (2009–2010; Dr. Seuss' How the Grinch Stole Christmas!)
- Reed Sigmund (2007–2026; How the Grinch Stole Christmas! at Children's Theatre Company)
- Steve Blanchard (2011–2013; Dr. Seuss' How the Grinch Stole Christmas!)
- Jeff McCarthy (2012; Dr. Seuss' How the Grinch Stole Christmas!)
- Shuler Hensley (2014; Dr. Seuss' How the Grinch Stole Christmas!)
- Chris Cox (2014; Horton and the Kwuggerbug and More Lost Stories audiobook)
- Philip Bryan (2016; Dr. Seuss' How the Grinch Stole Christmas!)
- Benedict Cumberbatch (2018; The Grinch)
- Philip Huffman (2018–2019; Dr. Seuss' How the Grinch Stole Christmas!)
- Gavin Lee (2018; Dr. Seuss' How the Grinch Stole Christmas!)
- Edward Baker-Duly (2019; Dr. Seuss' How the Grinch Stole Christmas!)
- Matthew Morrison (2020; Dr. Seuss' The Grinch Musical Live!)
- Andrew Polec (2021; Dr. Seuss' How the Grinch Stole Christmas!)
- Chimo Echeverría (2023; The Grinch: Christmas Adventures)
- James Austin Johnson (2023; 'Tis the Grinch Holiday Talk Show)
- David Kaye (2023; Capital One commercials)
- Darin De Paul (2023; Walmart commercials)
- Walton Goggins (2025; Walmart commercials)

== In popular culture ==
The Grinch has become an anti-icon of Christmas and the winter holidays, as a symbol of those who despise the holiday, much in the same nature as the earlier character of Ebenezer Scrooge. Over the years, the Grinch has appeared on various forms of memorabilia such as Christmas ornaments, plush dolls, and various clothing items. The grumpy, anti-holiday spirit of the character has led to the everyday term "Grinch" coming to refer to a person opposed to Christmas time celebrations or to someone with a coarse, greedy attitude. In 2002, TV Guide ranked The Grinch number 5 on its "50 Greatest Cartoon Characters of All Time" list.

He also made a brief appearance on the television in both Home Alone and Home Alone 2: Lost in New York.

The Grumple is a green monster featured in the Christmas special "Kill Gil, Volumes I & II" of The Simpsons. He is a parody of the Grinch and is voiced by Hank Azaria.

In The Fairly OddParents episode, "Merry Wishmas", Timmy Turner, Santa Claus, and the elves watch "How the Grump Stole Wishmas", a parody of the Grinch.

In an episode of Tiny Toon Adventures, a parody of the Grinch was voiced by Homer Simpson's voice actor Dan Castellaneta.

The Grinch also appeared as a cameo in Robot Chicken, voiced by the series creator Seth Green.

The Grinch also appeared as a cameo in Mad, voiced by Stephen Stanton.

In Family Guy, the Grinch made a cameo appearance, voiced by Wally Wingert.

In the season 19 Christmas special "The Grounch" of American Dad!, Roger turns into a Grinch-esque monster due to observing 1 year straight of celibacy and proceeds to steal the coital paraphernalia at a sex party. During his thieving rampage, a parody of "You're a Mean One, Mr. Grinch" plays, acknowledging that this plot line is, in fact, a parody.

In the early hours of Christmas Eve 2018, a group of climbers put a giant Santa hat on Antony Gormley's colossal Angel of the North statue (20 metres; 66' high, wingspan 54 metres; 177') near Gateshead, north England. They had attempted to do this, unsuccessfully, for several Christmases. In the early hours of December 29, the pranksters returned, one of them dressed as the Grinch and the others as Santa Claus, and the Grinch "stole" Santa's hat.

Starting in 2021, a popular meme depicted a blue version of the Grinch (known as "The Blinch") smiling, with text stating that his smile was a result of having "knee surgery tomorrow". The meme gained increased popularity in 2024.

A creature based on The Grinch, known as "The Gooch", was added to Grand Theft Auto Online in the 2022 holiday update. The creature appears in green smoke, robbing players of money and any items in their inventories. Defeating the creature grants the player an outfit similar to that of the Grinch.

In 2022, XYZ Films produced a horror film interpretation, starring David Howard Thornton as the "Mean One", a spoof of the Grinch character. In this adaption, the titled character became a literal monster that will kill anyone who celebrates Christmas. This leads to an adult, Cindy: who had met the Mean One a long time ago and witnessed him killing her mother, to try to stop his reign of terror and bringing the holiday spirit back to Newville.

Since 2024, McDonald's has sold a Grinch-themed meal only in Canada, usually with Dill Pickle McShaker fries, "Who-Hash bites" which are tiny tater tots, and mismatched socks.

In June 2026, Heritage Auctions celebrated Grinch's 60th anniversary by auctioning assemblies of artwork from Dr. Seuss’ How the Grinch Stole Christmas.

== In politics ==
Multiple politicians in the United Kingdom and the United States have been compared to the Grinch, often due to accusations that they will "steal" Christmas.

Sean Hannity and Laura Ingraham described then-president Joe Biden as "the Grinch Who Stole Christmas" on Fox News in 2021, criticizing him for delays in the supply chain for US imports.

Mick Lynch, former head of the UK's National Union of Rail, Maritime and Transport Workers, was compared to the Grinch from November to December 2022 in media coverage of the ongoing railway strikes by the union. Tabloid newspaper Metro as well as Prime Minister Rishi Sunak likened him to the Grinch and accused him of wanting to "steal Christmas". Lynch retorted that "I'm not the Grinch, I'm a trade union official and I'm determined to get a deal."

In December 2023, lawyers for Donald Trump called special counsel Jack Smith a Grinch in a court filing in response to Smith's request for an expedited appeal on whether Trump could claim presidential immunity. The filing directly quoted How the Grinch Stole Christmas!, arguing that if the US Court of Appeals for the District of Columbia Circuit did not rule against Smith's request, it "would make President Trump's opening brief due the day after Christmas. This proposed schedule would require attorneys and support staff to work round-the-clock through the holidays, inevitably disrupting family and travel plans. It is as if the Special Counsel 'growled, with his Grinch fingers nervously drumming, "I must find some way to keep Christmas from coming. … But how?"'"
