= Josh Ryan Evans =

American actor (1982–2002)

- Evans as Timmy Lenox.
- Born: Joshua Ryan Evans; January 10, 1982; Hayward, California, U.S.
- Died: August 5, 2002 (aged 20); San Diego, California, U.S.
- Resting place: Forest Lawn Memorial Park (Hollywood Hills)
- Other name: Josh Evans
- Occupation: Actor
- Years active: 1994–2002
- Height: 3 ft 2 in (97 cm)

Joshua Ryan Evans (January 10, 1982 – August 5, 2002) was an American actor who became known for his role of Timmy Lenox in the soap opera Passions. Evans was aged 17 to 20 during his tenure on Passions, but had the appearance and voice of a small child due to achondroplasia, a form of dwarfism. He was 3 feet 2 inches (97 cm) tall.

== Early life and career ==
Born in Hayward, California, Evans began his career at age twelve, appearing in various television commercials. He made his film debut portraying a toddler in Baby Geniuses in 1999. The following year he played the role of the young Grinch (Jim Carrey's character) in How the Grinch Stole Christmas. He also appeared as General Tom Thumb in the A&E original movie P.T. Barnum. Evans also had guest spots on Ally McBeal, 7th Heaven, and Poltergeist: The Legacy.

In 1999, Evans began portraying Timmy on the soap opera Passions. Evans' character was a doll that the evil witch Tabitha Lenox brought to life with magic. For his work on the series, he was nominated for a Daytime Emmy Award in 2000 and won two Soap Opera Digest Awards in 2000 and 2001.

The character of Timmy was intended to become an angel and remain a presence on the show, but the storyline had to be rewritten after Evans' death.

== Death ==
On August 5, 2002, Evans died at the age of 20, while undergoing surgery to correct a congenital heart condition. His body was cremated and his ashes were interred at Forest Lawn Memorial Park in Hollywood Hills. On the day of his death, his character Timmy on Passions also died and was aired on the same day.

== Filmography ==
Year	Title	Role	Note
1996–1997	Family Matters	Stevil	
1998	Ally McBeal	Oren Coolie	
1999	Poltergeist: The Legacy	Being (voice)	
1999	Hey Arnold!	Third Grader (voice)	credited as Josh Evans
1999	7th Heaven	Adam	
1999	P.T. Barnum	Tom Thumb	
1999	Rugrats	Small Boy (voice)	credited as Josh Evans
1999–2002	Passions	Timmy	
2000	How the Grinch Stole Christmas	8-year-old Grinch	
2004	All Grown Up!	Dude #1 (voice)	Final role; posthumous release; credited as Joshua Ryan

== Awards and nominations ==
Year	Award	Category	Title of work	Result
2001	Daytime Emmy Award	Outstanding Younger Actor in a Drama Series	Passions	Nominated
2000	Soap Opera Digest Awards	Favorite Scene Stealer	Passions	Won
2001	Soap Opera Digest Awards	Outstanding Male Scene Stealer	Passions	Won
2000	Young Artist Award	Best Performance in a Soap Opera - Young Actor	Passions	Nominated
2000	YoungStar Awards	Best Young Actor/Performance in a Daytime TV Series	Passions	Won
