= How the Grinch Stole Christmas! =

1957 children's story by Dr. Seuss

- Book cover
- Author: Dr. Seuss
- Illustrator: Dr. Seuss
- Language: English
- Genre: Children's literature
- Publisher: Redbook (magazine); Random House (book)
- Publication date: October 12, 1957 (Redbook); November 24, 1957 (renewed in 1985)
- Publication place: United States
- Media type: Print
- Pages: 64
- ISBN: 0-394-80079-6
- OCLC: 178325
- Preceded by: The Cat in the Hat (publication date); Horton Hears a Who! (in universe)
- Followed by: The Cat in the Hat Comes Back

How the Grinch Stole Christmas! is a children's Christmas book by Theodor "Dr. Seuss" Geisel written in rhymed verse with illustrations by the author. It follows the Grinch, a cranky, solitary creature who attempts to thwart the public's Christmas plans by stealing Christmas gifts and decorations from the homes of the nearby town of Whoville on Christmas Eve. As a result of the townspeople's response, the Grinch realizes that Christmas is not all about money and presents.

The story was published as a book by Random House in 1957, and at approximately the same time in an issue of Redbook. The book criticizes the commercialization of Christmas and the holiday season.

The book has been adapted many times, first as a 1966 animated TV film narrated by Boris Karloff, who also provided the Grinch's voice. In 1977, a Halloween prequel, Halloween Is Grinch Night, aired with the Grinch voiced by Hans Conried. These were followed with a 2000 live-action feature film starring Jim Carrey, a 2007 musical, a 2018 animated film by Illumination starring Benedict Cumberbatch, a 2020 live television adaptation of the musical starring Matthew Morrison as the Grinch and a 2023 Wondery podcast starring James Austin Johnson as the title character.

== Plot ==
The Grinch is a sour, solitary creature with a heart "two sizes too small" who lives on a mountain overlooking Whoville, the home of the Whos. Having been annoyed by Whoville's noisy Christmas festivities for 53 years, the Grinch resolves to stop Christmas from coming. He disguises himself as Santa Claus and travels to Whoville on a sleigh pulled by his dog, Max (who he disguises as a reindeer). Slinking down the chimney of the first house on the square, the Grinch steals all of the presents, the food for the feast, and even the Christmas tree. He is briefly interrupted by Cindy-Lou Who, a young Who girl, but he concocts a crafty lie to send her away, and she falls for it.

After doing the same to the other Whos' houses, the Grinch takes his sleigh to the peak of Mount Crumpit and prepares to dump all of the stolen items into an abyss. As morning arrives, he expects the Whos to be heartbroken, but he is surprised to hear them singing a joyous Christmas song instead. After much pondering, the Grinch realizes that Christmas means "a little bit more" than just presents and feasting, causing his heart to grow three sizes. The Grinch reforms and returns the Whos' presents and food and is invited to their Christmas feast.

== Background and publication history ==
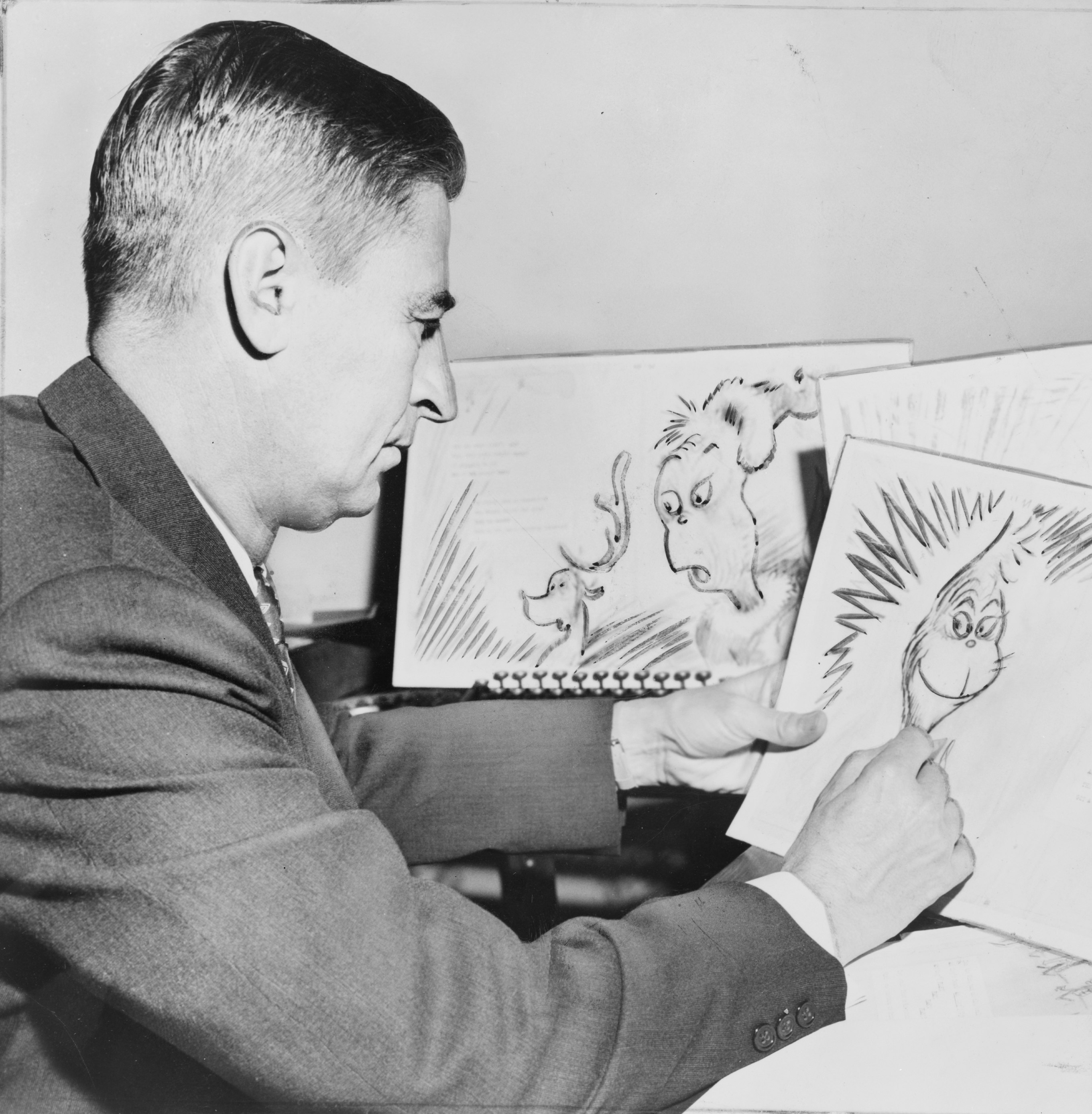
Dr. Seuss working on How the Grinch Stole Christmas! in 1957.

The Grinch first appears in the 1953 book Scrambled Eggs Super!, Then appeared in a 33-line illustrated poem by Dr. Seuss called "The Hoobub and the Grinch", which was originally published in the May 1955 edition of Redbook magazine. Dr. Seuss began work on How the Grinch Stole Christmas! several years later, around the beginning of 1957. He had recently completed The Cat in the Hat and was in the midst of founding Beginner Books with Phyllis and Bennett Cerf and his wife, Helen Palmer Geisel. Helen, who had ongoing medical problems and had suffered a small stroke in April 1957, nevertheless acted as an unofficial editor, as she had with previous Dr. Seuss books.

Dr. Seuss claimed he was the inspiration for the character, as his wife's health problems and his dismay with the commercialization of Christmas made him feel "very Grinchish" as he looked in the mirror one year on December 26, 1956.

Dr. Seuss wrote the book quickly and was mostly finished with it within a few weeks. Biographers Judith and Neil Morgan wrote that it was the easiest book of his career to write, except for its conclusion. According to Dr. Seuss:

I got hung up getting the Grinch out of the mess. I got into a situation where I sounded like a second-rate preacher or some biblical truism... Finally in desperation... without making any statement whatever, I showed the Grinch and the Whos together at the table, and made a pun of the Grinch carving the 'roast beast'. ... I had gone through thousands of religious choices, and then after three months it came out like that.

By mid-May 1957, the book was finished and in the mail to the Random House offices in New York, U.S.A. In June 1957, Dr. Seuss and Helen took a month-long vacation to Hawaii, where he checked and returned the book's galley proof. The book debuted in December, in both a book version published by Random House and in an issue of Redbook. Dr. Seuss dedicated the book to Theodor "Teddy" Owens, the one-year-old son of his niece, Peggy Owens.

As of 2005, the book had been translated into nine languages, including Latin as Quomodo Invidiosulus Nomine Grinchus Christi Natalem Abrogaverit. The translation was published in October 1998 by Bolchazy-Carducci Publishers Inc.

== Reception ==
M.S. Libby, writing in the New York Herald Tribune, compared the book favorably to Dr. Seuss's earlier works: "His peculiar and original genius in line and word is always the same, yet, so rich are the variations he plays on his themes, always fresh and amusing." Kirkus Reviews wrote, "Youngsters will be in transports over the goofy gaiety of Dr. Seuss's first book about a villain." The reviewer called the Grinch "easily the best Christmas-cad since Scrooge." Ellen Lewis Buell, in her review in The New York Times, praised the book's handling of its moral, as well as its illustrations and verse. She wrote:

Even if you prefer Dr. Seuss in a purely antic mood, you must admit that if there's a moral to be pointed out, no one can do it more gaily. The reader is swept along by the ebullient rhymes and the weirdly zany pictures until he is limp with relief when the Grinch reforms and, like the latter, mellow with good feelings.

The review for The Saturday Review of Literature stated: "The inimitable Dr. Seuss has brought off a fresh triumph in his new picture book... The verse is as lively and the pages are as bright and colourful as anyone could wish." The reviewer suggested that parents and older siblings reading the book to young children would also enjoy its moral and humor. Charlotte Jackson of the San Francisco Chronicle called the book "wonderful fantasy, in the true Dr. Seuss manner, with pictures in the Christmas colours."

== Analysis ==
Some writers, including Dr. Seuss, have made a connection between the Grinch and Dr. Seuss. In the story, the Grinch laments that he has had to put up with the Whos' celebration of Christmas for 53 years. As both Thomas Fensch and Charles Cohen note, Dr. Seuss was 53 when he wrote and published the book. Dr. Seuss asserted the connection in an article in the December 1957 edition of Redbook: "I was brushing my teeth on the morning of the 26th of last December when I noticed a very Grinch-ish countenance in the mirror. It was Seuss! So I wrote about my sour friend, the Grinch, to see if I could rediscover something about Christmas that obviously I'd lost." Seuss's step-daughter, Lark Dimond-Cates, stated in a speech in 2003, "I always thought the Cat... was Ted on his good days, and the Grinch was Ted on his bad days." Cohen notes that Seuss drove a car with a license plate that read "GRINCH".

Thomas Fensch notes that the Grinch is the first adult and the first villain to be a main character in a Dr. Seuss book.

== Adaptations ==
The book has been adapted into a variety of media, including stage and film. Chuck Jones and Ben Washam adapted the story as an animated television special in 1966, featuring narration by Boris Karloff, who also provided the Grinch's voice. Thurl Ravenscroft sang "You're A Mean One, Mr. Grinch", with lyrics written by Dr. Seuss himself. In 2000, the book was adapted into a live-action film, directed by Ron Howard and starring Jim Carrey as the Grinch. Illumination Entertainment also developed a 3D animated feature film, titled The Grinch, directed by Yarrow Cheney and Scott Mosier and starring Benedict Cumberbatch as the Grinch. It was originally scheduled to be released on November 10, 2017, but was pushed back to November 9, 2018., a live television adaptation of the musical Called Dr. Seuss' The Grinch Musical Live! (2020) Starring Matthew Morrison.

Several audio recordings and audiovisual adaptations of the book have also been published. In 1975, Zero Mostel narrated an LP record of the story. In 1992, Random House Home Video released an updated animated version of the book narrated by Walter Matthau, also including the story If I Ran The Zoo. In 2009, an interactive e-book version was released for the iPhone. In 2000, Rik Mayall read the book as one of four of Seuss's books on the audio CD The Dr Seuss Collection. In 2023, Wondery released a podcast inspired by the book, hosted by James Austin Johnson.

A musical stage version was produced by the Old Globe Theatre, San Diego in 2007. It also was produced on Broadway and a limited-engagement US tour in 2008. The North American Tour began in the fall of 2010 and has subsequently toured every fall since. The book was adapted into a 13-minute song, performed by the Boston Pops Orchestra, arranged by Danny Troob, and featuring bassist Reid Burton and actor Will LeBow narrating it on the Boston Pops's 2013 CD, "A Boston Pops Christmas – Live from Symphony Hall with Keith Lockhart".

== Legacy ==
Based on a 2007 online poll, the National Education Association listed the book as one of its "Teachers' Top 100 Books for Children". In 2012 it was ranked 61st among the "Top 100 Picture Books" in a survey published by School Library Journal – the fourth of five Dr. Seuss books on the list.

The book's main characters have made appearances in other works. The Grinch appears in the Three Other animated specials Horton Hears a Who! (1970), Halloween Is Grinch Night voiced by Hans Conried. and The Grinch Grinches the Cat in the Hat voiced by Bob Holt. the Grinch himself And Max (his pet dog) also appear in the children's puppet show The Wubbulous World of Dr. Seuss He's voiced by Anthony Asbury Through Season 1 (1996 - 1997) And Season 2 (1998), He Would Also appear Blue Sky's CGI Movie "Horton Hears a Who! (2008), The Grinch, Cindy-Lou Who, and Max, appear in Seussical, a musical which takes its plot from several Dr. Seuss books.

Since the book was written, the word "grinch" has entered the popular lexicon as an informal noun, defined as a "killjoy" or a "spoilsport".

=== Sequel ===
A sequel, titled How the Grinch Lost Christmas!, was released on September 5, 2023, published by Random House Children's Books. The book was written by Alastair Heim and illustrated by Aristides Ruiz.

== See also ==
- List of Christmas-themed literature

== General and cited sources ==
- Cohen, Charles (2004). The Seuss, the Whole Seuss, and Nothing But the Seuss: A Visual Biography of Theodor Seuss Geisel. Random House. ISBN 978-0-375-82248-3.
- Fensch, Thomas (2001). The Man Who Was Dr. Seuss. Woodlands: New Century Books. ISBN 0-930751-11-6.
- Lindemann, Richard (2005). The Dr. Seuss Catalog: An Annotated Guide to Works by Theodor Geisel in All Media, Writings About Him, and Appearances of Characters and Places in the Books, Stories and Films. McFarland & Company.
- MacDonald, Ruth (1988). Dr. Seuss. Twayne Publishers. ISBN 0-8057-7524-2.
- Morgan, Neil; Morgan, Judith Giles (1996). Dr. Seuss and Mr. Geisel: A Biography. New York: Da Capo Press. ISBN 978-0-306-80736-7.
- Nel, Philip (2004). Dr. Seuss: American Icon. Continuum Publishing. ISBN 0-8264-1434-6.
- Pease, Donald E. (2010). Theodor Seuss Geisel. Oxford University Press. ISBN 978-0-19-532302-3.
