= Halloween Is Grinch Night =

- Genre: Comedy horror
- Written by: Dr. Seuss
- Directed by: Gerard Baldwin
- Voices of: Hans Conried; Henry Gibson; Gary Shapiro; Hal Smith; Irene Tedrow; Jack DeLeon
- Narrated by: Hans Conried
- Composer: Joe Raposo
- Country of origin: United States

Production
- Executive producers: David H. DePatie; Friz Freleng
- Producer: Ted Geisel (Dr. Seuss)
- Running time: 26 minutes
- Production company: DePatie–Freleng Enterprises

Original release
- Network: ABC
- Release: October 28, 1977

Halloween Is Grinch Night (titled It's Grinch Night for the 1992 videocassette release and Grinch Night for the sing-a-long videocassette release) is a 1977 children's animated Halloween television special and is a prequel to the 1966 television special How the Grinch Stole Christmas! It premiered on ABC on October 28, 1977. Boris Karloff, the original voice actor for The Grinch, had died and was replaced by Hans Conried, with Thurl Ravenscroft singing as he did in the original special. The songs and score were written by Sesame Street composer Joe Raposo.

The special won the 1978 Primetime Emmy Award for Outstanding Children's Program.

== Plot ==
A sour sweet wind blows through Whoville. All of Whoville dreads the smell of the wind as an omen, and the whole village goes into lockdown. The sour sweet wind awakens the gree-grumps from their slumber in the tree stumps around Punkers Pond, and once woken up, the gree-grumps begin growling. This causes the pond to become upset and wavy, which disturbs the hakken-kraks that live there, and causes them to rise out of the water and begin yowling. All this noise carries all the way up Mount Crumpett, and to the king of Grinch Night, simply known as the Grinch, signaling that Grinch Night has come. The Grinch orders his dog, Max, to get the Paraphernalia Wagon, and they begin their journey down to Whoville for Grinch Night and the Grinch Night Ball. The Grinch's progress down the mountain to the town is monitored by Sergeant Samuel McPherson, who updates the Whos on the Grinch's progress.

Eucariah, a young Who with astigmatism, goes out to the "euphemism", which is then blown away by the strong winds. He is carried up to Mount Crumpett where he runs into the Wuzzy Woozoo, said to be the last in the community, and Max, who he acts friendly towards, before seeing the Grinch who is picking "brickles" out of his fur, the result of a failed attempt to hunt down the Wuzzy Woozoo. After giving Eucariah a brief spook, the Grinch decides the young boy is too small to waste time on and resumes his trek to Whoville.

Eucariah decides that he must stall the Grinch in order to save Whoville. Catching up to the Grinch's wagon and forcing him to stop twice, the irritated Grinch decides to give Eucariah the "spook's tour", and summons Eucariah to the top of the Paraphernalia Wagon where the Grinch opens the hatch at the top. Eucariah is drawn in to a surreal nightmare with spooks and monsters in all directions. Eucariah endures the spooks just long enough for the wind and Punkers Pond to die down, forcing the Grinch to abandon the trek and return home. Max, visibly depressed and nostalgic throughout the special, refuses to return with the Grinch and follows Eucariah home where he is greeted as a hero; the Grinch laments that he will "miss that Grinch Night Ball" but finds solace in "that wind will be coming back, someday; I'll be coming back, someday!" and plots to get a Grinch Night he will never forget and then ends this promise with a sinister laugh.

== Voice cast ==
- Hans Conried as The Grinch/Narrator
- Gary Shapiro as Eucariah
- Henry Gibson as Max (singing)
- Hal Smith as Josiah
- Jack DeLeon as Sergeant Samuel McPherson
- Irene Tedrow as Mariah
- Thurl Ravenscroft as Singer, Monsters (uncredited)

== Songs ==
1. "I Wouldn't Go Out on a Night Like This" – Josiah
2. "The Grinch Night Ball" – The Grinch
3. "How Many Times" – Max's inner voice, The Grinch
4. "As the Grinch Creaks Ever Closer..." – Chorus
5. "I Wouldn't Go Out on a Night Like This" (reprise) – Chorus
6. "He Is Wandering in the Wind" – Chorus
7. "The Eyebrow Song" – The Grinch
8. "The Spooks Tour"
  1. "Grinch Is Gonna Get You" – Monster Chorus
  2. "Members of the Un-human race" – Monster Chorus
  3. "The Spooks Tour Finale" – Monster Chorus
9. "Gone Is the Grinch" – Chorus

== Broadcast ==
Halloween Is Grinch Night premiered on ABC on October 29, 1977. ABC rebroadcast the special three times on October 26, 1978, October 28, 1979, and October 30, 1980 respectively. In the early 90s, Disney Channel acquired the rights to the special and it aired on October 13, 1991 and October 17, 1992. Cartoon Network broadcast the special on November 1, 1997.

== Home media ==
The special was first released on VHS by CBS/Fox Video via their PlayHouse Video banner in 1985. In 1992, it was released again by Random House Home Video on VHS under the title It's Grinch Night. It was also released on VHS by CBS Video through Fox Kids Video in 1996 under the title Grinch Night, along with a sing-along version, which was later re-released on VHS in 2000 by Paramount Home Video and again in 2001 by Universal Studios Home Entertainment. In 2003, the special was re-released once again, this time as a bonus special on the VHS and DVD release of Dr. Seuss on the Loose from Universal, and also under its original title (though the packaging and menu still referred to it as Grinch Night). The special was re-released on DVD, on October 18, 2011, this time through Warner Home Video under Dr. Seuss's Holidays on the Loose!, along with How the Grinch Stole Christmas! and The Grinch Grinches the Cat in the Hat. On October 23, 2018, it was released on Blu-ray by Warner Bros. Home Entertainment as an extra on Dr. Seuss' How the Grinch Stole Christmas: The Ultimate Edition, along with The Grinch Grinches the Cat in the Hat. Both extras were remastered in high definition for this release.

== See also ==
- How the Grinch Stole Christmas!, original 1957 book
- Rumors, another Ted Geisel cartoon featuring similarly-designed monsters
- List of films set around Halloween
