= The Grinch (video game) =

2000 video game

- North American cover art for PlayStation
- Developers: Artificial Mind & Movement (PS & DC); Konami (PC)
- Publisher: Konami
- Platforms: PlayStation; Dreamcast; Microsoft Windows
- Release: PlayStation: NA: November 10, 2000; EU: December 8, 2000; Dreamcast: NA: November 22, 2000; EU: December 15, 2000; Windows: NA: December 4, 2000; EU: December 15, 2000
- Genre: Platformer
- Mode: Single-player

The Grinch is a 2000 platform video game loosely based on the film How the Grinch Stole Christmas. Developed by Artificial Mind & Movement and published by Konami, the game was released in North America one week prior to the film's theatrical release—November 10, 2000. George Lowe does uncredited work as the narrator of the game.

== Gameplay ==
As the Grinch, the player can jump, ground pound, and use his smelly breath to guide his way through various obstacles in the game. As the game progresses different gadgets are unlocked which are used to complete different tasks. Various characters from the book and film appear as well, usually as an obstacle for the Grinch to bypass.

== Plot ==
The Grinch stares down at Whoville through his telescope from Mount Crumpit, planning to take the Whos' presents using his gadgets. He goes into his cave, and looks through his blueprints deciding which gadget to make first. However, the Grinch accidentally falls off his mountain of boxes and his blueprints fly away down to Whoville and various parts of Wholand. The Grinch visits Whoville, the Whoforest, Whoville Municipal Dump, and Wholake, destroying Christmas presents, playing pranks on the Whos and recovering pieces of his blueprints in the process so he can steal Christmas.

== Reception ==
Reception

Aggregate scores
Aggregator	Score		
Aggregator	Dreamcast	PC	PS
GameRankings	50%	50%	56%
Metacritic	51/100	55/100	55/100

Review scores
Publication	Score		
Publication	Dreamcast	PC	PS
AllGame	2/5	3.5/5	2.5/5
CNET Gamecenter	N/A	5/10	7/10
Electronic Gaming Monthly	N/A	N/A	2.67/10 (Note: In Electronic Gaming Monthly's review of the PlayStation version, two critics gave it each a score of 3/10, and the other gave it 2/10.)
Game Informer	N/A	N/A	5/10
GameFan	N/A	N/A	69%
GameSpot	6.3/10	N/A	4.8/10
GameSpy	4/10	N/A	N/A
GameZone	N/A	N/A	8/10
IGN	N/A	5.5/10	5/10
Next Generation	N/A	N/A	2/5
Official U.S. PlayStation Magazine	N/A	N/A	1.5/5
PC Zone	N/A	65%	N/A
The Cincinnati Enquirer	N/A	2.5/5	2.5/5

The Dreamcast, PC, and PlayStation versions received "mixed" reviews according to the review aggregation website Metacritic. John Gaudiosi of NextGen's review for the latter console version had positive comments on controls and graphics, but called the gameplay dull and not challenging and recommended the game only for Grinch fans. Star Dingo of GamePro's website-only review said, "While a scant few of The Grinch's tasks are fun, the rest are either boring, frustrating, or both." (Note: GamePro gave the PlayStation version three 2.5/5 scores for graphics, control, and fun factor, and 4/5 for sound.)

The game sold an estimated 20,000 units and generated US$660,000 in revenue.

== See also ==
- Dr. Seuss: How the Grinch Stole Christmas!, another Grinch video game
