= Dr. Seuss: How the Grinch Stole Christmas! =

2007 video game for the Nintendo DS

- Developers: Black Lantern Studios, Inc.
- Publishers: NA: DSI Games; EU: Zoo Digital Publishing
- Designers: Matt Raithel, Josh Brotherton
- Programmers: David Wilcox, Nick Jaross, Devin Clasby
- Artists: Gary Bedell, Joe Eisner
- Composer: Randall Ryan
- Platform: Nintendo DS
- Release: NA: November 8, 2007; PAL: November 23, 2007
- Genre: Adventure
- Mode: Single-player

Dr. Seuss: How the Grinch Stole Christmas! is a video game by American developer Black Lantern Studios based on the 1957 Dr. Seuss book of the same name, but mostly based on the 2000 film. The game was released on November 8, 2007.

== Reception ==
Reception

Aggregate scores
Aggregator	Score
GameRankings	54%
Metacritic	55/100

Review scores
Publication	Score
GameZone	7.5/10
IGN	3.5/10

Dr. Seuss: How The Grinch Stole Christmas! has received mixed reviews. GameRankings gave it a score of 54% and Metacritic gave it 55 out of 100.
