= Whoville =

Fictional town created by Dr. Seuss

- Dr. Seuss location
- Whoville, as seen in How the Grinch Stole Christmas! (1966)
- First appearance: Horton Hears a Who! (1954)
- Created by: Dr. Seuss

In-universe information
- Other name: Who-ville
- Characters: The Whos; Grinch

Whoville, sometimes written as Who-ville, is a fictional microscopic settlement created by the children's author Dr. Seuss. Whoville first appeared in the 1954 book Horton Hears a Who! and then in the 1957 book How the Grinch Stole Christmas! with significant differences between the two renditions. Denizens of Whoville go by the collective name Whos.

== Setting ==
In Horton Hears a Who!, the city of Whoville is located within a floating speck of dust which is then placed onto a clover flower by Horton the Elephant. In the book How the Grinch Stole Christmas however, the location of Whoville is never mentioned; geographic references include the mentioning of the several thousand-foot tall Mount Crumpit where Grinch resides. In the 1977 television special Halloween Is Grinch Night, which implies that the overlook is located on Mount Crumpit, additional geographic features are added to Whoville such as Punkers Pond, where sea monsters known as Hakken-Kraks.

In the 1970 television special Horton Hears a Who! as well as the 2008 CGI-animated film of the same name, Whoville retains its literary location being within a speck on a clover flower. The 1966 television special How the Grinch Stole Christmas also stays true to the literature.

In the 2000 live-action film adaptation of How the Grinch Stole Christmas, Whoville is located inside a snowflake.

In 2008 film Horton Hears a Who!, due to Whoville's tiny size, it is highly vulnerable to unexpected movement and weather events, a major plot point in the film.

== Inhabitants ==
=== Whos ===
The Whos are depicted as whimsical, furry, and colorful creatures who live in Seussian-shaped houses, and known for their cheerfulness.

In the 1987 Soviet Ukrainian animated Horton Hears A Who short by Kievnauchfilm titled My Friends, Where Are You?, the Whos resemble tiny yellow elves with pointy noses and cone shaped hats. In the 1992 Horton Hears A Who Russian animated short titled I Can Hear You!, the Whos are identical to humans and live in a simple agrarian society where they mow grass, work in the mill and rear chickens and horses as microscopic as they are, and Whoville is shown as a small village rather than a city.

In the 2000 live-action adaptation of How the Grinch Stole Christmas, the Whos are portrayed as having large ears, buck-teeth, and strange hairstyles. While the Who children have ordinary human noses, the adult Whos' noses are snout shaped. Their greed and materialism is more emphasized than the original book.

=== Mayor of Whoville ===
In the 1970s animated special Horton Hears a Who!, rather than a mayor he is a professor of Science, Dr. H. Hoovey, who lives in the Eiffelberg Tower, played by Hans Conried.

In the live-action film How the Grinch Stole Christmas, there is a mayor named Augustus May Who, played by Jeffrey Tambor.

Actor Steve Carell voices the Mayor of Whoville in the 2008 animated film Horton Hears a Who. In this version, he is named Ned McDodd, and he lives with his wife, 96 daughters, and one son named Jo-Jo as well as the latest of a long lineage of the mayors of Whoville.

In the 2018 CGI film The Grinch, Whoville's Mayor McGerkle, voiced by Angela Lansbury, oversees the town's tree-lighting ceremony.

=== Grinch ===
In How the Grinch Stole Christmas, north of Whoville and atop the tall Mount Crumpit, a bitter, cave-dwelling creature named the Grinch lives with his dog, Max. The Grinch has green fur and is described as having a heart that is "two sizes too small. He is highly misanthropic and detests the Whos' Christmas celebrations.

The Grinch disguises himself as Santa Claus and sneaks into Whoville to steal the Whos' presents. However, the Grinch has a sudden change of heart, ultimately returning all of the presents and returns to Whoville to celebrate with the Whos.

In the 2000 live-action film How the Grinch Stole Christmas the Grinch is given a backstory where he was raised in Whoville. As a child, the Grinch is bullied at school, causing him to leave for Mount Crumpit.

== Sources ==
- Rowe, Rebecca (2023). "'A Younger, Less Hairy Me': Developing the Inner Child in Film Adaptations of Children's Literature". Children's Literature Association Quarterly. 48 (1): 63–79. doi:10.1353/chq.2023.a905626.
