= You're a Mean One, Mr. Grinch =

1966 Christmas song with lyrics by Theodor "Dr. Seuss" Geisel

Song by Thurl Ravenscroft
- Released: 1966
- Recorded: 1966
- Composer: Albert Hague
- Lyricist: Dr. Seuss

"You're a Mean One, Mr. Grinch" is a Christmas song that was originally written and composed for the 1966 animated special Dr. Seuss' How the Grinch Stole Christmas!

== History ==
The lyrics were written by Theodor "Dr. Seuss" Geisel, the music was composed by Albert Hague, and the song was performed by Thurl Ravenscroft.

Because Ravenscroft was not credited in the closing credits of the special, it is often mistakenly attributed to Boris Karloff, who served as narrator and the voice of the Grinch in the special and occasionally sang, but not in this instance. Until Ravenscroft was publicly credited, Tennessee Ernie Ford was also speculated to be the voice behind the song.

The soundtrack to the special won the Grammy Award for Best Album for Children at the 10th Annual Grammy Awards.

The song has been incorporated into most other adaptations of the story. In the 2000 live-action film, Jim Carrey performs the song in character as the Grinch, singing about himself and in the soundtrack in two versions along with the hip-hop version with American rapper Busta Rhymes and Carrey rapping about the Grinch titled: "Grinch 2000" which samples the original song. The stage musical adaptation included the song in the score, among several other original numbers composed specifically for that production. The 2018 CGI animated film features a substantially updated version of the song from Tyler, the Creator featuring an orchestral arrangement by Danny Elfman.

The song was also covered by New Jersey alternative rock band the Whirling Dervishes. Writer Chris Jordan of the Asbury Park Press called their version "wonderfully depraved in the best of holiday ways" and noted that their version became a "Jersey classic".

Other artists who have recorded versions include Lindsey Stirling with Sabrina Carpenter who hit number 10 on the Adult Contemporary chart.

== Charts ==
=== Glee cast version ===
Chart (2010–11)	Peak position
US Holiday Digital Songs (Billboard)	45

=== Thurl Ravenscroft version ===
Chart (2018–2026)	Peak position
Canada (Canadian Hot 100)	44
Global 200 (Billboard)	73
Latvia (DigiTop100)	80
US Billboard Hot 100	31
US Holiday 100 (Billboard)	14
US Rolling Stone Top 100	24

=== Lindsey Stirling and Sabrina Carpenter version ===
Chart (2024)	Peak position
US Adult Contemporary (Billboard)	10
