= Thurl Ravenscroft =

American actor (1914–2005)

- Ravenscroft in 1967
- Born: Thurl Arthur Ravenscroft; February 6, 1914; Norfolk, Nebraska, U.S.
- Died: May 22, 2005 (aged 91); Fullerton, California, U.S.
- Resting place: Crystal Cathedral Memorial Gardens, Garden Grove, California
- Education: Otis College of Art and Design
- Occupations: Actor; singer
- Years active: 1939–2005
- Spouse: June Seamans (m. 1946; died 1999)
- Children: 2
- Musical career
- Genre: Pop
- Instrument: Vocals

Thurl Arthur Ravenscroft (/ˈθɜːrl ˈreɪvənzkrɒft/; February 6, 1914 – May 22, 2005) was an American actor and bass singer best known for providing the voice of Tony the Tiger in Kellogg's Frosted Flakes commercials from the 1950s until his death and for singing "You're a Mean One, Mr. Grinch" in the 1966 Christmas television special How the Grinch Stole Christmas!.

Ravenscroft did voice-over work and singing for Disney in various films and Disneyland attractions (which were later featured at Walt Disney World), the best known including The Haunted Mansion, Country Bear Jamboree, Mark Twain Riverboat, Pirates of the Caribbean, Disneyland Railroad, and Walt Disney's Enchanted Tiki Room.

His voice-acting career began in 1939 and lasted until his death in 2005 at age 91.

== Early life and career ==
Ravenscroft left his native Norfolk, Nebraska, in 1933 for California, where he studied at Otis Art Institute. In 1939, he joined a singing group formed by tenor Bill Days called The Sportsmen: Days, Johnny Rarig, Max Smith, and Ravenscroft. They served as backing singers to vocalist Marie Greene on the Okeh record label (credited as "Marie Greene and Her Merry Men"). The quartet also contributed to a Disney feature, Pinocchio (1940), singing "Honest John". This was deleted from the film, but can still be heard in the supplements on the 2009 DVD.

The group, billed as The Four Merry Men, appeared in three-minute musical films, produced in 1941 by the Featurettes company, for coin-operated jukeboxes. That same year the Four Merry Men left Featurettes for the more successful Soundies company, and made more jukebox musicals; they were now billing themselves as "The Four Sportsmen". They were also very popular on radio and in live nightclub appearances.

In 1942, Thurl Ravenscroft left the Sportsmen quartet to serve in the armed forces. He served as a navigator contracted to the U.S. Air Transport Command, spending five years flying courier missions across the north and south Atlantic. Among the notables carried on board his flights were Winston Churchill and Bob Hope. As he told an interviewer: "I flew Winston Churchill to a conference in Algiers and flew Bob Hope to the troops a couple of times. So it was fun."

When he returned from the service, he found that his place in The Sportsmen had been taken by bass singer Gurney Bell, and Bell was unwilling to relinquish the job to Ravenscroft. Undaunted, Ravenscroft formed his own quartet, The Mellomen, which contributed to other Disney films, such as Alice in Wonderland and Lady and the Tramp. The group appeared on camera in a few episodes of the Disney anthology television series; in one instance recording a canine chorus for Lady and the Tramp and in another as a barbershop quartet that reminds Walt Disney of the name of the young newspaper reporter Gallagher. Ravenscroft sang bass on Rosemary Clooney's "This Ole House", which went to No. 1 in both the United States and Britain in 1954, as well as Stuart Hamblen's original version of that same song. He sang on the soundtrack for Ken Clark as "Stewpot" in South Pacific, one of the top-selling albums of the 1950s. He also backed The DeCastro Sisters on their 1955 top 20 hit, "Boom Boom Boomerang." He sang "King of the River," as the character Mike Fink, on a Golden Record released in 1956. Singing with the Johnny Mann Singers, his distinctive bass can also be heard as part of the chorus on 28 of their albums that were released during the 1960s and 1970s. He was also the bass singer on Bobby Vee's 1960 Liberty hit record "Devil or Angel". Andy Williams' recording of "The 12 Days of Christmas" features him as well. His work with Spike Jones included singing "(I Was a) Teenage Brain Surgeon" for the 1959 album Spike Jones in Stereo.

He sang the opening songs for the two Disney serials used on The Mickey Mouse Club, Boys of the Western Sea and The Hardy Boys: Mystery of the Applegate Treasure.

He sang the "Twitterpatter Song" and "Thumper's Song" on the Disneyland record Peter Cottontail and other Funny Bunnies.

On the Disneyland record All About Dragons, he both provided the narration and sang the songs "The Reluctant Dragon" and "The Loch Ness Monster".

His voice was heard during the Pirates of the Caribbean ride as well as The Haunted Mansion at Disneyland as Uncle Theodore, the lead vocalist of the singing busts in the cemetery near the end of the ride. He also played the Narrator in The Story and Song From the Haunted Mansion. Ravenscroft is also heard in the Enchanted Tiki Room as the voice of Fritz the Animatronics parrot, as well as the tree-like Tangaroa tiki god in the pre-show outside the attraction. He was also the voice of the Disneyland Railroad in the 1990s. Further roles include that of The First Mate on The Mark Twain Riverboat, a spokesalien for Tokyo Disneyland's Pan Galactic Pizza Port restaurant, and the American bison head named Buff at The Country Bear Jamboree.

== Later career ==
One of Ravenscroft's best-known works is as the vocalist for the song "You're a Mean One, Mr. Grinch". He was accidentally uncredited, leading the song to be misattributed to Boris Karloff and Tennessee Ernie Ford. The song, now credited to Ravenscroft, peaked on the U.S. Billboard Hot 100 chart at number 32 for the week ending January 2, 2021.

Ravenscroft sang "No Dogs Allowed" in the Peanuts animated motion picture Snoopy Come Home.

For more than 50 years, he was the uncredited voice of Tony the Tiger for Kellogg's Frosted Flakes. His booming bass gave the cereal's tiger mascot a voice with the catchphrase "They're g-r-r-r-eat!!!!".

Various record companies, such as Abbott, Coral, Brunswick, and "X" (a division of RCA) also released singles by Ravenscroft, often in duets with little-known female vocalists, in an attempt to turn the bass-voiced veteran into a pop singer. These efforts were commercially unsuccessful, if often quite interesting. He was also teamed up with the Andrews Sisters (on the Dot Records album The Andrews Sisters Present) on the cover of Johnny Cymbal's "Mr. Bass Man". The Mellomen released some doo-wop records under the name Big John & the Buzzards, a name apparently given to them by the rock-and-roll-hating Mitch Miller.

A devoted Christian, he appeared on many religious television shows such as The Hour of Power. In 1970, he recorded an album called Great Hymns in Story and Song, which featured him singing 10 hymns, each prefaced with the stories of how each hymn came to be, with the background vocals and instrumentals arranged and conducted by Ralph Carmichael.

In the 1980s and 1990s, Ravenscroft was narrator for the annual Pageant of the Masters art show at the Laguna Beach, California, Festival of the Arts.

== Personal life ==
Ravenscroft married June Seamans in 1946 and they had two children. June died in 1999.

== Later life and death ==
Ravenscroft died at his home on May 22, 2005, from prostate cancer, at the age of 91. He was buried at the Memorial Gardens at the Crystal Cathedral in Garden Grove, California.

In the June 6, 2005, issue of the advertising industry journal Advertising Age, Kellogg's ran an advertisement commemorating Ravenscroft, the headline reading: "Behind every great character is an even greater man."

== Filmography ==
=== Film ===
Year	Title	Role	Notes
1940	Pinocchio	Monstro	
1940	Isle of Destiny	Sportsman Quartet Member	
1940	Little Blabbermouse	Bad Tobacco Face	Voice
1940	Prehistoric Porky	Bass Lizard	
1941	Dumbo	Singer of "Look Out For Mr. Stork" and "Pink Elephants on Parade"	
1941	The Nifty Nineties	Singer	
1942	Wacky Blackout	Carrier Pigeon singing	
1942	Saludos Amigos	Singer of the main title theme	
1944	Springtime for Pluto	Singing Caterpillar	Short, Voice
1948	Melody Time	Singer	Voice
1948	So Dear to My Heart	Bull / Robert Bruce	Voice
1951	Alice in Wonderland	Card Painter	Voice
1951	Rooty Toot Toot	Jonathan Bailey a.k.a. "Honest John the Crook"	
1952	Jack and the Beanstalk	Singing voices of two villagers	
1953	Peter Pan	Singer / Pirates	Voice
1953	Toot, Whistle, Plunk and Boom	Singer	
1954	Rose Marie	Medicine Man	
1955	Daddy Long Legs	Daydream Sequence Song	Short, Voice
1955	Lady and the Tramp	Al the Alligator / Singing Pound Dogs	Voice
1956	Design for Dreaming	(singer)	Voice
1956	Hardy Boys	Theme Song	Voice
1958	Paul Bunyan	Paul Bunyan	Short, Voice
1959	Sleeping Beauty	Singer	
1961	One Hundred and One Dalmatians	Captain the Horse	Voice
1962	Gay Purr-ee	Hench Cat	Voice
1963	The Sword in the Stone	Sir Bart	Voice
1964	Mary Poppins	Banker / Pig	Voice
1964	Hey There, It's Yogi Bear	Black-haired Policeman	Voice
1965	The Man from Button Willow	Singer / Reverend / Saloon Man	Voice
1966	Winnie the Pooh and the Honey Tree	Eeyore (singing voice) / Singer	Voice
1966	How the Grinch Stole Christmas	Singer of "You're a Mean One, Mr. Grinch"	Voice
1967	The Jungle Book	Colonel Hathi's crew	Voice
1967	The War Wagon	Backup singer on main theme	
1968	Winnie the Pooh and the Blustery Day	Singer / Black Honeypot	
1969	Butch Cassidy and the Sundance Kid	Singing Voice	performed "South American Getaway"
1969	The Trouble with Girls	Bass Singer	with the Bible Singers Quartet (The Mellomen)
1970	Horton Hears a Who!	Wickersham Brother	
1970	The Phantom Tollbooth	Lethargians	
1970	The Aristocats	Billy Bass	Voice
1971	The Cat in the Hat	Thing One	Voice
1971	Bedknobs and Broomsticks	Singing voice of Russian vendor / Various cartoon animal voices	
1972	Snoopy Come Home	Singer of "No Dogs Allowed"	Voice
1972	The Lorax	Singer	Voice
1977	The Hobbit	Goblins/Chorus	Voice
1977	Halloween Is Grinch Night	Singer / Monsters	Voice
1977	Donny & Marie	Darth Vader / Narrator	Star Wars Segment
1977	The Many Adventures of Winnie the Pooh	Eeyore (singing voice) / Singer / Black Honeypot	Archive Footage
1978	The Small One	Potter	Voice
1979	Rudolph and Frosty's Christmas in July	The Genie of the Ice Scepter	Voice
1987	The Brave Little Toaster	Kirby	Voice
1990	Disney Sing Along Songs: Disneyland Fun – It's a Small World	Singer of "Grim Grinning Ghosts"	
1996	Superior Duck	The Narrator	Voice
1997	The Brave Little Toaster 2 the Rescue	Kirby	Voice, final film role
1998	The Brave Little Toaster 3: Goes to Mars	Kirby	Voice, final film role

=== Television ===
Year	Title	Role	Notes
1995	The Baby Huey Show	General Does-Little	Voice; ep. "Target...Huey!"

=== Theme parks ===
Year	Title	Role	Notes
1955	Mark Twain Riverboat	Bosun	Voice
1963–	The Enchanted Tiki Room	Fritz the Parrot, Tangaroa	Voice
1967–	Pirates of the Caribbean	Pirates/Chorus, Singing Dog	Voice
1967–1987	Adventures Thru Inner Space	Chorus	Voice
1969–	The Haunted Mansion	Uncle Theodore	
1971–	Country Bear Jamboree	Buff the Buffalo	Voice
1984–	Country Bear Christmas Special	Buff the Buffalo	Voice
1986	Country Bear Vacation Hoedown	Buff the Buffalo	Voice
1989–2023	Splash Mountain	Brer Frog	Voice
1988–2002	Disneyland Railroad	Announcer	Voice

=== Commercials ===
Year	Title	Role
late 1970s–early 1980s	Toys R Us	Geoffrey the Giraffe
1953–2005	Kellogg's Frosted Flakes	Tony the Tiger

== Partial solo discography ==
- Mad, Baby, Mad – 1955 (Fabor)
- I Ain't Afraid – 1956 (Bally)
- You Wanna Talk About Texas – 1956
- Wing Ding Ding – 1956
- Big Paul Bunyan – 1962 (Globe)
- Gold Dubloons and Pieces of Eight – 1962 (The Hardy Boys: Mystery of the Applegate Treasure)
- The Headless Horseman – 1965 (Disney)
- Great Hymns In Story And Song – 1970 (Light)
- Rubber Duckie and Other Songs From Sesame Street – 1970
- Nathaniel the Grublet (In Direwood) – 1979 (Birdwing)
- Psalms and Selahs – 2002

== See also ==
- Eli Gorenstein
