= The Grinch Grinches the Cat in the Hat =

1982 American animated musical television special

- Genre: Musical; Comedy; Adventure
- Written by: Dr. Seuss
- Directed by: Bill Perez
- Voices of: Bob Holt; Mason Adams
- Narrated by: Mason Adams
- Music by: Joe Raposo
- Country of origin: United States
- Original language: English

Production
- Executive producer: David H. DePatie
- Producers: Friz Freleng; Dr. Seuss
- Running time: 25 minutes
- Production companies: Marvel Productions; DePatie–Freleng (in-name only)

Original release
- Network: ABC
- Release: May 20, 1982

The Grinch Grinches the Cat in the Hat (also known as The Cat in the Hat Gets Grinched, or The Grinch Vs. the Cat in the Hat) is a 1982 American Emmy Award–winning animated musical television special and crossover starring The Grinch and The Cat in the Hat, also serving as a stand-alone sequel to The Cat in the Hat. Completed in 1981, it premiered on May 20, 1982, on ABC and would be DePatie and Freleng's final Dr. Seuss special and the only Dr. Seuss cartoon by Marvel Productions. The songs were written by Sesame Street composer Joe Raposo.

== Plot ==
The Grinch wakes up in a good mood one morning until his reflection in the mirror (presumably an apparition of his father) speaks to him, prompting him to repeat the "Grinch's Oath", reminding him of his evil, venomous nature, and he leaves to prove himself. Meanwhile, The Cat in the Hat goes on a picnic. Their paths cross when the Grinch bumps his car into the Cat's, and things quickly escalate into a fierce car chase after the Cat inadvertently insults the Grinch by calling him "Mr. Greenface".

The Cat returns to the safety of his home, but the Grinch follows him to demonstrate a device he has invented that scrambles all sounds within a 50-mile radius, including the Cat's voice. Back home, the Grinch decides to upgrade the device into a "darkhouse", an anti-lighthouse that spreads beams of darkness.

The Cat becomes livid with the Grinch's hijinks and has a psychiatric session with him in a thought bubble to find out what makes him so mean-spirited. He gets nowhere with the imaginary Grinch (though he is briefly triggered by the memory of his mother), so the Cat then decides to go over and have a talk with him. The Grinch makes it so dark that the Cat can't see where he's going, and he crashes his car when he passes a "Dead End" sign. The Grinch decides to liven things up by changing the beam of darkness to persimmon pink.

The Cat takes refuge in a nearby restaurant, while the Grinch sends beams that make things change colours, and literally and crazily come to life, and his hijinks result in confusion all over the place. The Cat has now become sick and tired of the Grinch and ponders to himself how he can change the Grinch, eventually finding an idea and rallies up everybody in the restaurant to follow him to the Grinch's house. There, he leads everyone in a song to remind the Grinch of all of the love he received from his mother and implore him to change his ways and be a better person. Before the Grinch can get to the darkhouse to scramble it, he collapses in grief over the memory of his mother and he and Max dismantle the darkhouse.

The next morning, the Grinch is again happy, but when the reflection tries to turn him evil again, Max reveals he left the device intact and scrambles the reflection's words in the mirror.

== Voice cast ==
- Mason Adams as The Cat in the Hat / Narrator
- Bob Holt as The Grinch / Waiter / The Grinch's Mother
- Frank Welker as Max / Waiter / Additional voices
- Joe Eich as Chef

== Musical numbers ==
1. "A Beelzeberry Day" – The Cat
2. "Relax-ification" – The Cat
3. "Master of Everyone's Ears" – The Grinch
4. "Most Horrible Things" – The Grinch
5. "Psychiatry Song" – The Cat
6. "Remember Your Mother" – The Cat / Chef / String Quintet / Waiters / Male Quartet Singers

== Awards ==
1982 Primetime Emmy Award for Outstanding Animated Program.

== Production notes ==
Both the Grinch and the Cat in the Hat were recast with different voice actors than the ones used in previous specials, all of whom had died. Bob Holt voiced the Grinch (Hans Conried, who voiced the Grinch in Halloween Is Grinch Night, died four months before this special had aired, while Boris Karloff, the original voice of the Grinch, died in 1969) and Mason Adams took over voicing the Cat in the Hat from Allan Sherman, who died in 1973.

Since Freleng was absent from production on Pink at First Sight due to him breaking up the studio he began with DePatie before returning to Warner Bros. Pictures, this was the only other fully animated DFE production to be made by Marvel Productions and one of the last DFE cartoons Freleng was involved in. Coincidentally, Marvel's figurehead, Stan Lee, had served in the same division of the United States Army as Dr. Seuss during World War II.

== Home media ==
The special was first released on VHS in the mid-80s via CBS/Fox Video's Playhouse Video division, and reissued later in the 90s by Random House Home Video. The Random House Home Video release used the title The Cat in the Hat Gets Grinched. The special retained its normal name on VHS re-releases (including Dr. Seuss Sing-Along Classics) by 20th Century Fox Home Entertainment with CBS Video and Fox Kids Video. It was also re-released on VHS in 2000 by Paramount Home Entertainment.

It was later released on DVD by Universal Pictures Home Entertainment/Universal Studios Family Productions. The special was released again on DVD by Warner Home Video on October 18, 2011 as part of the Dr. Seuss's Holidays on the Loose! DVD set, along with How the Grinch Stole Christmas! and Halloween Is Grinch Night. In October 2018, it was released on Blu-ray by Warner Bros. Home Entertainment as an extra on Dr. Seuss' How the Grinch Stole Christmas: The Ultimate Edition, along with Halloween Is Grinch Night. Both extras were remastered in high definition for this release.
