= How the Grinch Stole Christmas (2000 film) =

Film by Ron Howard

- Theatrical release poster
- Directed by: Ron Howard
- Screenplay by: Jeffrey Price; Peter S. Seaman
- Based on: How the Grinch Stole Christmas! by Dr. Seuss
- Produced by: Brian Grazer; Ron Howard (Note: Howard was an uncredited producer in the film's release poster and home media. However, he received a "Produced by" credit alongside Grazer onscreen in the film's opening credits.)
- Starring: Jim Carrey; Jeffrey Tambor; Christine Baranski; Bill Irwin; Molly Shannon
- Cinematography: Donald Peterman
- Edited by: Dan Hanley; Mike Hill
- Music by: James Horner
- Production companies: Universal Pictures; Imagine Entertainment
- Distributed by: Universal Pictures (United States and Canada); United International Pictures (International)
- Release dates: November 8, 2000 (Los Angeles); November 17, 2000 (United States)
- Running time: 105 minutes
- Country: United States
- Language: English
- Budget: $123 million
- Box office: $351 million

Dr. Seuss' How the Grinch Stole Christmas (Note: Also known as How the Grinch Stole Christmas, or Dr. Seuss' The Grinch) is a 2000 American Christmas fantasy comedy film directed by Ron Howard and written by Jeffrey Price and Peter S. Seaman, loosely based on the 1957 children's book of the same name by Dr. Seuss. It was the first of two Dr. Seuss books to be adapted into a live-action feature film, and the second adaptation of the book following the 1966 animated TV special. Narrated by Anthony Hopkins, the film stars Jim Carrey as the Grinch, a misanthropic green creature living on Mount Crumpit, who despises Christmas and the joyful residents of Whoville and sets out to sabotage their holiday celebration. The supporting cast includes Jeffrey Tambor, Christine Baranski, Bill Irwin, Taylor Momsen and Molly Shannon.

How the Grinch Stole Christmas premiered in Los Angeles on November 8, 2000, and was released theatrically in the United States on November 17 by Universal Pictures. The film received mixed reviews from critics, but was a commercial success, grossing $351 million on a budget of $123 million, becoming the highest-grossing film of 2000 domestically, the sixth-highest-grossing film of 2000 worldwide, and the fourth-highest-grossing holiday film of all time behind Home Alone 2: Lost in New York (1992). At the 73rd Academy Awards, the film won Best Makeup and Hairstyling, in addition to earning nominations for Best Production Design and Best Costume Design. Carrey's performance earned him a nomination for the Golden Globe Award for Best Actor in a Motion Picture – Musical or Comedy.

A sequel is in development, with Carrey and Howard set to return as the title character and director respectively.

== Plot ==
The Grinch, a bitter, grouchy green creature who lives in a cave on Mount Crumpit, hates Christmas and plans to ruin it for the Whos of Whoville. After a chance encounter with the Grinch at the Whoville post office, a little Who girl named Cindy Lou Who learns from several adults that the Grinch was raised by an elderly female Who couple. In school, the Grinch was infatuated with his classmate, Martha May Whovier. After the class bully, Augustus MayWho, mocked him for his hairy face, the Grinch tried to shave and injured himself. When everyone in class, except for Martha, laughed at him, the Grinch snapped and ran away to live on Mount Crumpit.

Determined to try to make things right, Cindy nominates the Grinch as the town's Holiday Cheermeister; the townsfolk agree, but MayWho, now the Mayor, and his aide Whobris, object. Cindy personally travels to Mount Crumpit to invite the Grinch to Whoville. The Grinch initially refuses, but ultimately decides to go after he learns Martha will be there. At the ceremony, the Grinch participates in various events, and actually begins to enjoy himself and the Whos' company, who likewise begin to warm up to him. However, MayWho gives the Grinch an electric razor as a present, deliberately reminding him of his childhood trauma. To further humiliate the Grinch, MayWho proposes to Martha in front of everyone, offering her a new car as an engagement gift, but the Grinch scratches its paintwork, accuses the Whos of valuing Christmas only for its materialism, and wreaks havoc before returning to his cave.

Learning that the Whos are still planning to celebrate, the Grinch hatches a plan to steal all the Whos' Christmas presents, decorations, and food while they sleep. Disguising himself as Santa Claus, and his dog Max as a reindeer, the Grinch descends into Whoville on a high-tech sleigh and starts by going into Cindy Lou Who's house. Cindy mistakes him for Santa Claus, and the Grinch manages to convince her he is just taking the tree to the North Pole for repairs before sending her to bed with a glass of water. As she leaves, she asks him not to forget the Grinch, surprising him. After she goes to bed, the Grinch strips the entire town of its Christmas decorations, stuffing everything into a giant sack and driving it to the top of Mount Crumpit.

On Christmas morning, the Whos wake up to discover the theft, and MayWho accuses Cindy of causing the Grinch to ruin Christmas. Cindy's father, postmaster Lou Lou Who, defends her, reminding the town that Christmas is about more than gifts and decorations. Inspired by his words, the Whos come together and sing Christmas carols, while Cindy sets out to find the Grinch.

As the Grinch prepares to push the sleigh of presents and decorations off the top of Mount Crumpit, he hears the Whos singing below and realizes that his plan has failed. Struck by the true meaning of Christmas, the Grinch's heart grows three sizes, and he becomes overcome with emotions before noticing the sleigh is about to slip off the mountain into the gorge below, with Cindy atop it. In a feat of strength, the Grinch lifts the sleigh and saves Cindy and the town's Christmas decor.

Upon returning to Whoville, the Grinch gives back the stolen gifts and decorations and apologizes. He surrenders to the police, but they let him go, despite MayWho's objections, and Martha immediately returns MayWho's engagement ring and professes her love for the Grinch. After joining the Whos for carol singing, the Grinch allows them to hold their traditional Christmas feast in his cave.

== Cast ==
- Jim Carrey as the Grinch, an eccentric, short-tempered, misanthropic, cynical, and scheming green-furred creature, who despises Christmas. Carrey accepted the lead role when he heard a tape of a kid's choir singing the song You're a Mean One, Mr. Grinch.
  - Josh Ryan Evans as 8-year-old Grinch in his final film role before his death in 2002
- Kelley as Max, the Grinch's mistreated pet dog and best friend. To play Max, six dogs in total were used. The main among them was a dog named Kelley who was rescued from a pound by Ron Howard. The other dogs had their hair cut and dyed to resemble Kelley.
  - Frank Welker provides the vocal effects of Max. Welker had previously provided the vocal effects of Max in The Grinch Grinches the Cat in the Hat.
- Jeffrey Tambor as Augustus MayWho, Whoville's loathsome, self-centered, prejudiced, and judgmental mayor, who will go to great lengths to get what he wants. He was also the reason the Grinch hated Christmas.
  - Ben Bookbinder as 8-year-old Augustus, who bullies the Grinch into running away so that he can have Martha for himself
- Christine Baranski as Martha May Whovier, a wealthy socialite who secretly has feelings for the Grinch and loathes Augustus for his cruel behavior
  - Landry Allbright as 8-year-old Martha, the only one in the Grinch's school who did not make fun of him, as she had already begun to have a crush on him
- Taylor Momsen as Cindy Lou Who, Lou and Betty's kindhearted daughter who wonders if Whoville has forgotten the true meaning of Christmas. In the film, she is six years old, while in the 1957 book and the 1966 TV special, she is "no more than two."
- Bill Irwin as Postmaster Lou Lou Who, Betty's husband and Cindy, Drew and Stu's father
- Clint Howard as Whobris, the mayor's sycophantic aide and servant
  - Reid Kirchenbauer as 8-year-old Whobris, who took part in bullying the Grinch at school
- Mindy Sterling as Clair Nella Who, one of the Grinch's two adoptive mothers
- Rachel Winfree as Rose Who, one of the Grinch's two adoptive mothers
- Molly Shannon as Betty Lou Who, Lou's wife and Cindy, Stu and Drew's mother
- Jeremy Howard as Drew Lou Who, one of the mischievous sons of Lou and Betty, twin brother of Stu and older brother of Cindy
- T. J. Thyne as Stu Lou Who, the other mischievous son, twin brother of Drew and older brother of Cindy
- Jim Meskimen as Officer Lihan Who, the chief of police
- Mary Stein as Miss Rue Who, the Grinch's school teacher who later becomes Cindy's teacher
- Deep Roy as Post Officer Clerk
- Rance Howard as Elderly Timekeeper
- Verne Troyer as Band Member
- Bryce Dallas Howard as Surprised Who
- Anthony Hopkins as Narrator. Hopkins recorded the entire narration for the film in a single day.

== Production ==
=== Development ===
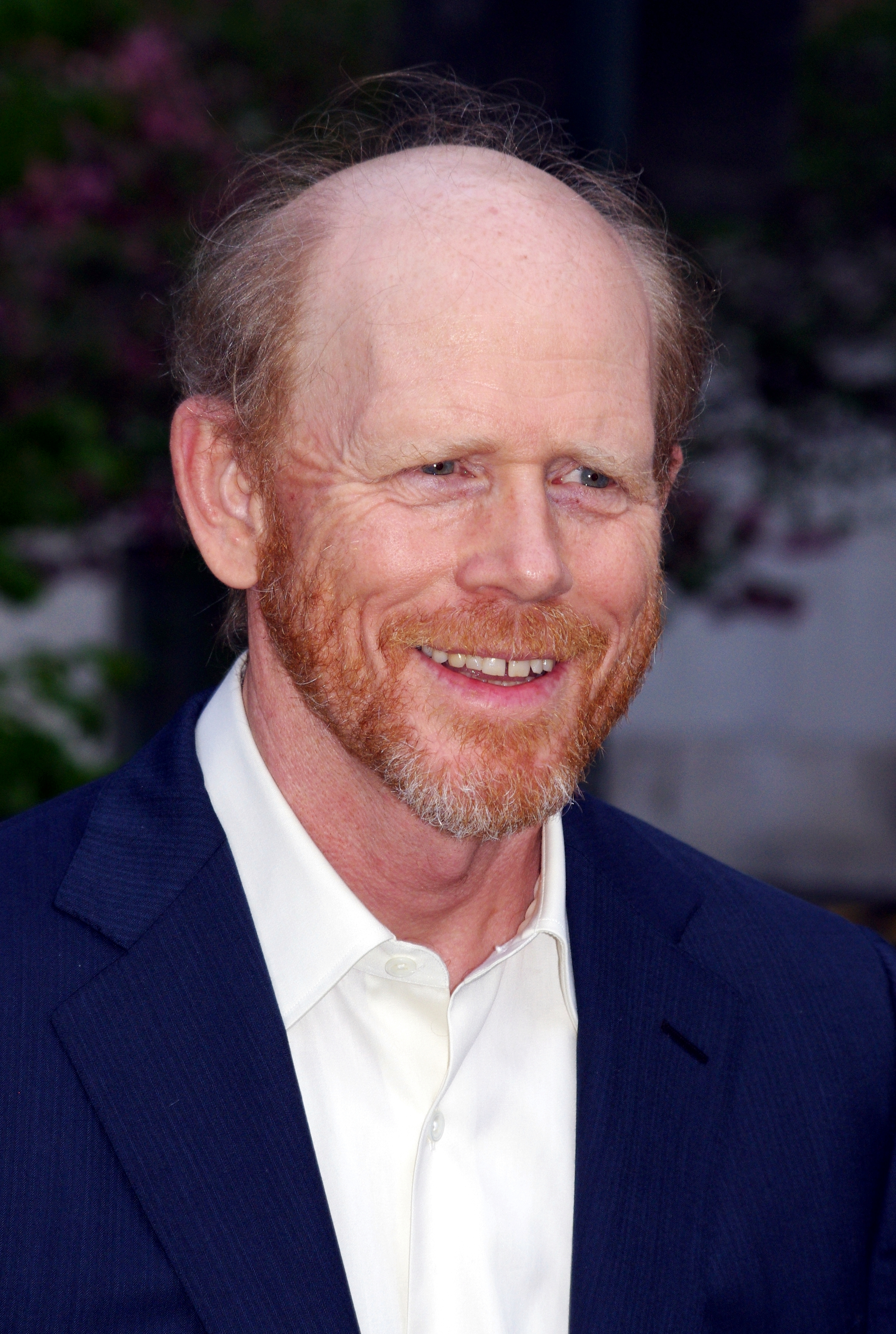
Ron Howard, director and producer

Before his death in 1991, Dr. Seuss consistently declined offers to sell the film rights to his books. However, following his death, his widow Audrey Geisel began entertaining several merch deals, such as clothing lines, accessories, and CDs. In July 1998, her agents made a significant announcement: the film rights to How the Grinch Stole Christmas would be auctioned. The terms were stringent—suitors had to be willing to pay $5 million upfront, 4% of the box-office gross, 50% of merchandising revenue, 70% of book tie-in profits, and music-related income. In addition, any actor considered for the role of the Grinch had to be of a similar stature to Jack Nicholson, Dustin Hoffman, Robin Williams or Jim Carrey. Only directors or writers who had previously earned at least $1 million on a previous project were eligible to participate.

Several studios and filmmakers pitched their vision for the live-action Grinch. 20th Century Fox, with director Tom Shadyac and producers Dave Phillips and John Davis, pitched their version with Jack Nicholson in mind for the Grinch. The Farrelly brothers and John Hughes also submitted their own versions. Other studios such as Paramount Pictures and New Line Cinema were also interested in purchasing the film rights. Universal Pictures, represented by Brian Grazer and Gary Ross, also made a presentation, but all offers were initially rejected by Geisel. Grazer, however, enlisted his producing partner, Ron Howard, to join negotiations. Though Howard was initially uninterested in a live-action Grinch and was focused on adapting The Sea-Wolf, Grazer convinced him to visit Geisel for a pitch. While reviewing the book, Howard became intrigued by Cindy Lou Who's character and developed a vision for a film with an expanded role for her, a deeper portrayal of the Whos, and a more fleshed-out backstory for the Grinch. During the pitch meeting, Geisel wanted Jack Nicholson as the Grinch but Grazer felt that he did not have the qualities that they wanted, she then responded on who he wanted for the Grinch and he replied that he only wanted to do it with Jim Carrey.

In September 1998, Howard officially signed on to direct and co-produce the film, with Jim Carrey cast as the Grinch. John Stamos auditioned for the role, but backed out due to being allergic to prosthetics. It was later revealed that Universal Pictures paid $9 million for the rights to How the Grinch Stole Christmas and Oh, the Places You'll Go!. Before Howard's involvement, Tim Burton was approached to direct but turned down the offer due to a scheduling conflict with Sleepy Hollow.

The final screenplay, written by Jeffrey Price and Peter S. Seaman (known for Who Framed Roger Rabbit and Doc Hollywood), underwent eight drafts before reaching a final version. Audrey Geisel had significant control over the script, vetoing several jokes she found inappropriate, including one about a family called the "Who-steins" who lacked a Christmas tree and presents. Additionally, she rejected the inclusion of a stuffed trophy of The Cat in the Hat on the Grinch's wall. Alec Berg, David Mandel and Jeff Schaffer, writers from Seinfeld, contributed to an uncredited rewrite.

=== Filming and makeup ===
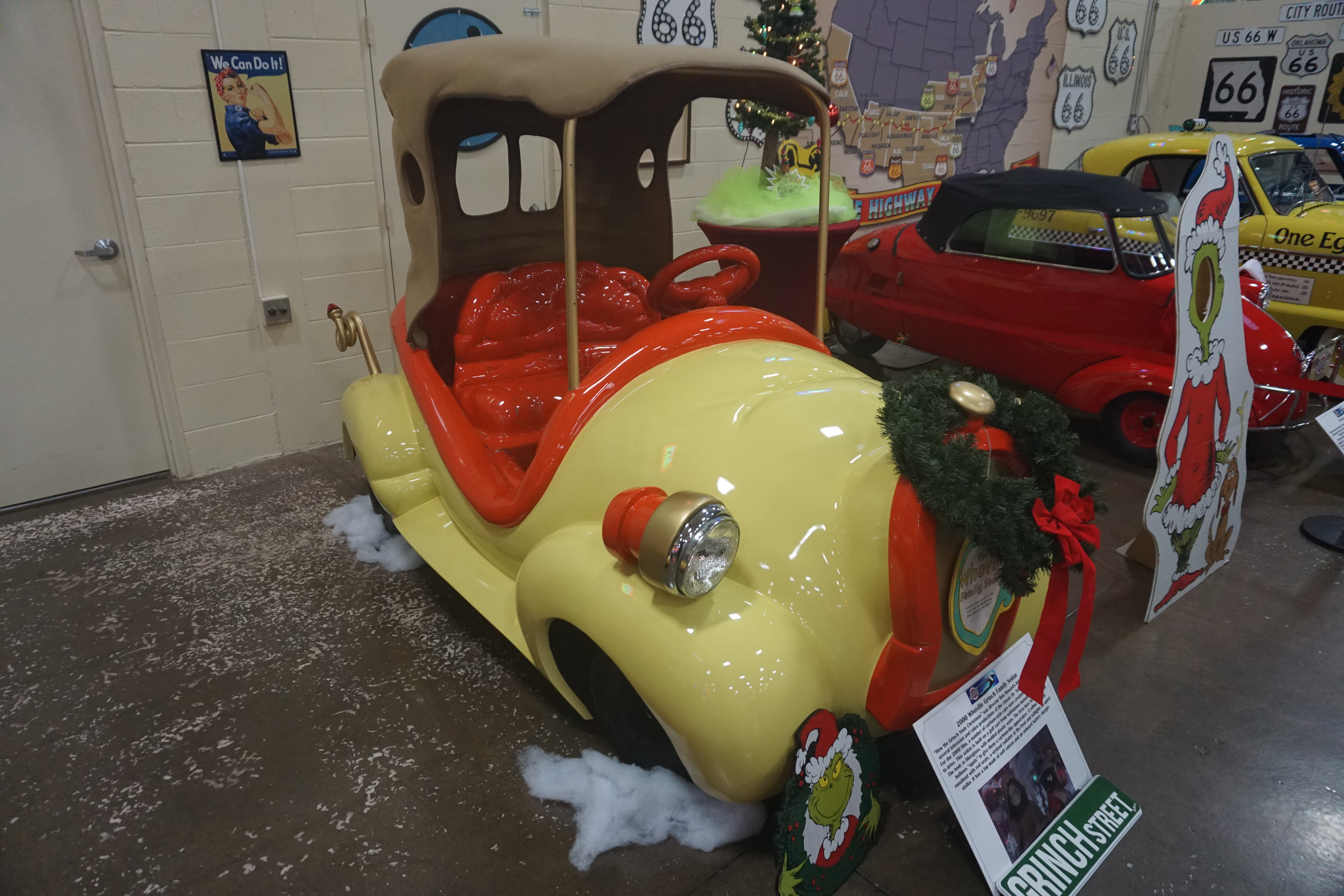
Whoville Grinch Family Sedan from How the Grinch Stole Christmas at Stahls Automotive Collection

Principal photography began in September 1999 and wrapped in January 2000. Geisel visited the set on October 11, 1999. The majority of the Whoville set was constructed on the Universal Studios Backlot located behind the iconic Bates Motel set from Psycho (1960) and its 1998 remake of the same name (which Imagine Entertainment also produced).

Rick Baker, the makeup artist, was responsible for designing and creating the prosthetic makeup for Jim Carrey and the rest of the cast. According to Baker on an episode of The Joe Rogan Experience, originally, "they wanted me to paint Jim Carrey green and that was it" but after leaking a test video of himself in Grinch makeup, the studio agreed to Baker's version in the film. The Grinch costume was made of yak hair, dyed green, and sewn onto a spandex suit. Carrey complained that the costume was itchy, that he could not breathe out of his prosthetic nose and that he could hardly see out of the painful yellow contact lens he insisted on wearing for the role, although some scenes required post-production digital alterations to color Carrey's eyes and ease his discomfort.

The makeup application process for Carrey took up to two-and-a-half hours each day, and Carrey often compared wearing the costume to "being buried alive." In his frustration, he once kicked a hole in the wall of his trailer. Kazu Hiro, Carrey's makeup artist, recalled that Carrey was initially difficult to work with on set, often being irritable and disappearing during shoots. This led to significant production delays, with only three days' worth of footage being completed after two weeks of filming. Hiro eventually left the production, but after discussions with Ron Howard and Baker, Carrey agreed to control his temper, and Hiro returned to the set. To help Carrey cope with the grueling makeup process, producer Brian Grazer hired former SEAL Team Six consultant officer Richard Marcinko to train him in methods for "enduring torture".

Josh Ryan Evans, who portrayed the eight-year-old Grinch, wore the same type of makeup and bodysuit as Carrey. Over the course of filming, Carrey spent 92 days in Grinch makeup and eventually became more comfortable with the process. Most of the makeup appliances used for the actors were connected to their upper lips, along with prosthetic noses, ears, dentures, and wigs.

To keep Carrey's spirits up during production, Howard once donned a Grinch suit himself, and on another occasion, he invited actor Don Knotts to the set, knowing Carrey was a fan of Knotts' work. At a press conference for Me, Myself & Irene in June 2000, Carrey discussed his motivations for portraying the Grinch, saying, "I looked at him as not just being an angry guy. Nobody is just an angry guy. What we are is hurt, whether it's self-imposed or something happened to us. That made me able to make [the Grinch] sympathetic. That's how I approached it. This is a guy who wants to be invited to the party, but can't admit it to himself".

During one scene, where the Grinch is directing his dog, Max, Carrey improvised by mimicking Howard's directing style. Howard found the impression hilarious and decided to include the moment in the final cut of the film.

=== Visual effects ===
The film's visual effects and animation were provided by Rhythm & Hues Studios (R&H) and Digital Domain, who crafted the computer-generated imagery (CGI) environments and characters.

In addition to the visual effects, the movie relied heavily on practical effects and extensive makeup to transform Jim Carrey into the Grinch. This involved hours of makeup application using pioneering techniques that allowed for flexibility in Carrey's facial expressions, enabling him to maintain his comedic timing and exaggerated movements despite the prosthetics.

== Music ==
The soundtrack album for the film was released on November 7, 2000. It features a collection of music performed by several artists, including Busta Rhymes, Faith Hill, Eels, Smash Mouth, and NSYNC. An expanded edition of the soundtrack featuring more cues from Horner's score was released on November 1, 2022 on La-La Land Records.

== Release ==
=== Theatrical ===
How the Grinch Stole Christmas was first screened on November 8, 2000 at the Universal Amphitheatre to the cast and crew, as well as others in the industry, including Will Smith.

How the Grinch Stole Christmas was theatrically released by Universal Pictures in the United States and Canada on November 17, 2000, alongside Rugrats in Paris: The Movie, The 6th Day, and Bounce. The film's theatrical screenings was initially accompanied by a teaser trailer for The Mummy Returns, but due to complaints from parents about the frightening and intense nature towards younger children, it was pulled.

On November 23, 2000, the film was then released in Germany, and one week later, on November 30, it was released in Argentina, Australia, Malaysia, and the Netherlands. Later on December 1, 2000, the film received a widespread release in the United Kingdom, Denmark, Spain, Finland, Greece, Ireland, Israel, Mexico, Norway, Poland, Portugal, Sweden, Uruguay and South Africa. Throughout December, the film would also be released in France, Croatia, Chile, Hungary, Brazil, Japan, South Korea and Russia, among others.

How the Grinch Stole Christmas was later re-released in Germany on November 15, 2001. As part of the film's 25th anniversary, the film was theatrically re-released on December 12, 2025.

=== Television ===
How the Grinch Stole Christmas premiered on television on ABC on November 25, 2004, and aired there until December 25, 2014 (except for 2009 due to it still airing on Starz). From December 5, 2004 to December 12, 2015, it was paired with the animated television special, airing annually as part of ABC Family's 25 Days of Christmas, which later became Freeform's event in December 2, 2017. During its airings, additional deleted scenes were featured that were not part of the original theatrical, VHS, or DVD releases. These included extended scenes such as Cindy's dad maxing out his credit card on gifts, Cindy inquiring about the Grinch before school (removed on NBC broadcasts), Lou visiting Cindy after she stayed late at school (removed on NBC broadcasts), Augustus asking out Martha while she decorates her house (removed on NBC broadcasts), and extended Grinch scenes in his cave and at the Christmas party. Other added content involved Martha May and Betty Lou competing in the Christmas Lights Contest in which it was won by Martha May, the Grinch trying on different outfits, and various moments showing the Whos preparing for Christmas.

Since December 25, 2017, How the Grinch Stole Christmas has aired on NBC on Christmas night at 8:30 p.m. in all time zones except for Puerto Rico and the U.S. Virgin Islands, which aired at 9:30 p.m. AST (due to NBC affiliates in these territories using the Eastern Time Zone feed), following the airing of the animated television special. However, it did not air in 2022 due to an NFL game between the Tampa Bay Buccaneers and the Arizona Cardinals and still airing on HBO until July 2023. On December 6, 2020, it aired on FX to promote the television premiere of the 2018 CGI-animated film of The Grinch.

=== Marketing ===
In the summer of 2000, a trailer for How the Grinch Stole Christmas debuted in theaters, attached to screenings of Mission: Impossible 2. This was part of an agreement between Paramount Pictures and Universal Pictures, in which Paramount agreed to show the Grinch trailer in exchange for Universal screening a Paramount trailer in front of Nutty Professor II: The Klumps. A second trailer debuted on October 6, 2000, along with the release of Meet the Parents.

Simultaneously, Toys "R" Us launched a massive promotional campaign for the film, transforming their stores into "Whobilation Headquarters" with one of the most elaborate visual merchandising displays in the company's history. Stores featured floor-to-ceiling window graphics of the film's characters, and in some locations, 8-foot 3D Grinch-themed characters adorned the entrances. Wendy's also joined the promotion, offering kids meal toys featuring the Grinch. Additional promotional partners included Kellogg's, Nabisco, Hershey's, Visa, Coca-Cola, and United States Postal Service.

To further coincide with the film's release, Universal Studios Hollywood and Universal Islands of Adventure introduced Grinchmas, a holiday event that has since become an annual tradition at the theme parks.

=== Home media ===
How the Grinch Stole Christmas was released on VHS and DVD on November 20, 2001 by Universal Studios Home Video. In its first week of release, it sold a combined total of 8.5 million home video units, including three million DVDs and four million VHS copies, making it the best-selling holiday home video title at that time. The film became one of only four titles—alongside Star Wars: Episode I – The Phantom Menace, Shrek, and The Mummy Returns—to sell more than two million DVD copies during their opening weeks. It also achieved the distinction of being the second-highest opening-week home video sales for any live-action film, following Titanic.

In December 2001, Variety reported that the film was the second-biggest-selling home video release of the year behind Shrek, with 16.9 million copies sold and $296 million in revenue. A Blu-ray/DVD combo pack was released on October 13, 2009, followed by a digitally remastered Blu-ray release on October 13, 2015. The film was also remastered in 4K and released on 4K Ultra HD Blu-ray on October 17, 2017, and then again on November 3, 2025.

== Reception ==
=== Box office ===
How the Grinch Stole Christmas grossed $265.5 million domestically and $85.1 million in other territories, for a worldwide total gross of $350.6 million, making it the sixth-highest-grossing film of 2000.

In the United States, the film earned $15.6 million on its opening day. Over the weekend, it grossed $55.1 million, with an average of $17,615 from 3,127 theaters. At the time of its release, it had the fifth-highest-grossing three-day opening weekend of any film, trailing behind Toy Story 2, Mission: Impossible 2, Star Wars: Episode I – The Phantom Menace, and The Lost World: Jurassic Park. The film also had the highest opening weekend for a non-sequel film, replacing X-Men. Additionally, it surpassed Batman Forever to secure the largest opening weekend for a Jim Carrey film and set a new record for Ron Howard's highest-grossing opening weekend, overtaking Ransom (1996). It achieved the biggest opening weekend for an Imagine Entertainment film, surpassing Nutty Professor II: The Klumps, as well as Universal's highest non-holiday opening weekend. Upon its opening, How the Grinch Stole Christmas went on to reach the number one spot at the box office, beating Charlie's Angels, Rugrats in Paris: The Movie, The 6th Day, and Bounce. It held the record for the highest-grossing opening weekend for a Christmas-themed film for 18 years, until the 2018 animated version of The Grinch surpassed it with $67.6 million.

In its second weekend, the film grossed $52.1 million, dropping just 5.1%, setting a record for the highest-grossing second weekend for any film at that time, surpassing The Phantom Menace. In total, the film made $73.8 million over the five-day Thanksgiving weekend, outgrossing the newly released Unbreakable and 102 Dalmatians. This was the first non-Disney film to top the Thanksgiving weekend box office since Mrs. Doubtfire in 1993. It remained at the top of the box office for four weekends, making it one of the only two films of the year to achieve this feat, with Universal's own Meet the Parents being the other one. Eventually, the film was overtaken by What Women Want and Dude, Where's My Car? in mid-December when it was in its fifth weekend. It continued to draw holiday crowds, outperforming another family film, The Emperor's New Groove. On December 19, 2000, its 33rd day of release, it surpassed Mission: Impossible 2 to become the highest-grossing film of the year domestically, collecting a total of $216.4 million. It also became one of the year's three films cross the $200 million mark, with the others being Mission: Impossible 2 and Cast Away. How the Grinch Stole Christmas ended its theatrical run on March 1, 2001, with a final domestic gross of $260,044,825. Box Office Mojo estimates that the film sold over 48.1 million tickets in North America.

=== Critical response ===
On review aggregation website Rotten Tomatoes, 50% of 146 critics' reviews are positive, with an average rating of 5.8/10. The website's consensus reads, "Jim Carrey shines as the Grinch. Unfortunately, it's not enough to save this movie. You'd be better off watching the TV cartoon." Metacritic, which uses a weighted average, assigned the film a score of 46 out of 100, based on 29 critics, indicating "mixed or average" reviews.

Roger Ebert gave the film two out of four stars, describing it as "a dank, eerie, weird movie about a sour creature" and noting that the production design lacked the festive brightness that the material required. Ebert remarked that Carrey "works as hard as an actor has ever worked in a movie, to small avail", but noted that adults might appreciate Carrey's effort "in an intellectual sort of way."

Paul Clinton of CNN highlighted Carrey's dominance in the film, stating that "Carrey was born to play this role" and adding that "if he's not in the scene, there is no scene". Similarly, Owen Gleiberman of Entertainment Weekly commented on the Grinch's "mischievously divided" personality and praised how Carrey's performance transitions from chaotic to heartfelt, concluding that Carrey "carreys the movie" [sic] by skillfully balancing his wild antics with a genuine emotional turn.

Peter Stack of the San Francisco Chronicle said, "Nobody could play the Grinch better than Jim Carrey, whose rubbery antics and maniacal sense of mischief are so well suited to How the Grinch Stole Christmas. Dr. Seuss himself might have turned to Carrey as a model for the classic curmudgeon had the actor been around in 1957." However, he wondered why Carrey "made himself sound like Sean Connery" and warned that the character's intensity may frighten small children. James Berardinelli of ReelViews wrote that Carrey's "off-the-wall performance is reminiscent of what he accomplished in The Mask, except that here he never allows the special effects to upstage him. Carrey's Grinch is a combination of Seuss's creation and Carrey's personality, with a voice that sounds far more like a weird amalgamation of Sean Connery and Jim Backus (Bond meets Magoo!) than it does Karloff." He concluded that Carrey "brings animation to the live action, and, surrounded by glittering, fantastical sets and computer-spun special effects, Carrey enables Ron Howard's version of the classic story to come across as more of a welcome endeavor than a pointless re-tread."

Other reviews were more mixed. Stephanie Zacharek of Salon criticized the film, writing that "Carrey pulls off an admirable impersonation of an animated figure ... It's fine as mimicry goes—but mimicry isn't the best playground for comic genius." While acknowledging a few "terrific ad-libs," she felt Carrey's jokes were "nothing more than a desperate effort to inject some offbeat humor into an otherwise numbingly unhip, nonsensical and just plain dull story."

Todd McCarthy of Variety echoed some of these sentiments, noting that Carrey "tries out all sorts of intonations, vocal pitches, and delivery styles" in his performance, at times reminding viewers of James Cagney and Humphrey Bogart. However, McCarthy felt that while Carrey's antics hit the mark at times, they also seemed "arbitrary and scattershot." He further commented that Carrey's "free-flowing tirades, full of catch-all allusions and references, are pitched for adult appreciation" and were likely to "sail right over the heads of pre-teens."

=== Accolades ===
Award	Category	Recipient	Result	Ref.
73rd Academy Awards	Best Art Direction	Michael Corenblith and Merideth Boswell	Nominated	
73rd Academy Awards	Best Costume Design	Rita Ryack	Nominated	
73rd Academy Awards	Best Makeup	Rick Baker and Gail Rowell-Ryan	Won	
58th Golden Globe Awards	Best Actor – Musical or Comedy	Jim Carrey	Nominated	
2001 Kids' Choice Awards	Favorite Movie	How the Grinch Stole Christmas	Won	
2001 Kids' Choice Awards	Favorite Movie Actor	Jim Carrey	Won	
2001 MTV Movie Awards	Best Villain	Jim Carrey	Won	
ASCAP Film and Television Music Awards	Top Box Office Films	James Horner (also for The Perfect Storm)	Won	
21st Golden Raspberry Awards	Worst Remake or Sequel	How the Grinch Stole Christmas	Nominated	
21st Golden Raspberry Awards	Worst Screenplay	Jeffrey Price and Peter S. Seaman	Nominated	
2000 Stinkers Bad Movie Awards	Worst Supporting Actress	Taylor Momsen	Nominated	
2000 Stinkers Bad Movie Awards	Worst Song or Song Performance	"Christmas, Why Can't I Find You?" by Taylor Momsen	Nominated	
2000 Stinkers Bad Movie Awards	Worst On-Screen Hairstyle	Taylor Momsen	Nominated	
27th Saturn Awards	Best Fantasy Film	How the Grinch Stole Christmas	Nominated	
27th Saturn Awards	Best Director	Ron Howard	Nominated	
27th Saturn Awards	Best Actor	Jim Carrey	Nominated	
27th Saturn Awards	Best Performance by a Younger Actor	Taylor Momsen	Nominated	
27th Saturn Awards	Best Costume Design	Rita Ryack, David Page	Nominated	
27th Saturn Awards	Best Music	James Horner	Won	
27th Saturn Awards	Best Make-up	Rick Baker and Gail Rowell-Ryan	Won	
27th Saturn Awards	Best Special Effects	Kevin Scott Mack, Matthew E. Butler, Bryan Grill, and Allen Hall	Nominated	

== Sequel ==
In December 2024, despite Dr. Seuss's widow Audrey Geisel's disapproval and prohibition over producing live-action adaptations of her husband's works in the future, Carrey stated that he was open to reprising his role as the Grinch in a new film on the condition that he could portray the Grinch through motion capture technology, citing his "extremely excruciating" experience with makeup in the original film.

In June 2026, the sequel was officially in development, with Howard returning to direct, Alec Berg, Jeff Schaffer, and David Mandel writing the script, and Carrey in talks to return. In November 2026, Howard clarified that the sequel had been announced prematurely, as a script had yet to be written. He also stated that the film would only move forward if he and Carrey believed it had “a chance to be great.”

== See also ==
- The Grinch (film), Illumination's 2018 animated film adaptation
- The Mean One, an unauthorized 2022 horror parody
- The Grinch (video game)
- List of Christmas films
