= The Grinch (film) =

2018 Illumination film

Dr. Seuss' The Grinch
- Theatrical release poster
- Directed by: Scott Mosier; Yarrow Cheney
- Screenplay by: Michael LeSieur; Tommy Swerdlow
- Based on: How the Grinch Stole Christmas! by Dr. Seuss
- Produced by: Chris Meledandri; Janet Healy
- Starring: Benedict Cumberbatch; Rashida Jones; Kenan Thompson; Angela Lansbury; Pharrell Williams
- Edited by: Chris Cartagena
- Music by: Danny Elfman
- Production companies: Universal Pictures; Illumination
- Distributed by: Universal Pictures
- Release date: November 9, 2018
- Running time: 86 minutes
- Country: United States
- Language: English
- Budget: $75 million
- Box office: $553 million

Dr. Seuss' The Grinch (or simply The Grinch) is a 2018 American animated Christmas comedy film based on How the Grinch Stole Christmas! by Dr. Seuss. Produced by Universal Pictures and Illumination, it was directed by Scott Mosier and Yarrow Cheney and written by Michael LeSieur and Tommy Swerdlow. Narrated by Pharrell Williams, the film stars Benedict Cumberbatch as the Grinch, with Rashida Jones, Kenan Thompson, and Angela Lansbury in supporting roles. The plot follows the Grinch, who plans to stop Whoville's Christmas celebration by stealing all the town's decorations and gifts, with his pet dog Max.

The film is the third screen adaptation of the book, following the 1966 television special and the 2000 live-action film. It was announced in 2013 with Peter Candeland set to direct, and by 2016, Cumberbatch was cast, and Cheney later joined to co-direct while produced from Chris Meledandri, Janet Healy, and Mosier, and Latifa Ouaou, Audrey Geisel and Chris Renaud to executive produce. However, in 2018, Mosier took over Candeland's position as co-director upon the trailer's release, but Candleland remained credited for Additional Story Direction for the film. Danny Elfman composed the score, with a reworked version of You're a Mean One, Mr. Grinch, with rapper Tyler, the Creator, and an original song written and performed by Tyler.

The Grinch was released in the United States on November 9, 2018. The film received mixed reviews from critics and grossed $553 million, becoming the highest-grossing Christmas film in history, as well as the highest-grossing Dr. Seuss film adaptation.

== Plot ==
In the town of Whoville, the Whos are filled with excitement about celebrating Christmas. However, the only one who is not thrilled is the grumpy, cantankerous and green-furred Grinch, whose heart is "two sizes too small". He lives in his cave with his dog, Max, and only goes into Whoville to buy groceries.

One day, 6-year-old Cindy Lou Who notices her single mother Donna is overworked trying to take care of herself and her twin infant brothers, Buster and Bean. Cindy Lou initially decides to send a letter to Santa Claus to help her mother, but after an encounter with the Grinch, who sarcastically tells her that, if the matter is so urgent, she will have to talk to Santa face-to-face about it, she decides to go to the North Pole to talk to Santa himself. When Donna tells her that a round trip to the North Pole would take a month, she instead decides to try trapping Santa with the help of her friends.

Following a failed attempt to sabotage Whoville's tree-lighting ceremony, the Grinch experiences several flashbacks to his unhappy childhood. Overwhelmed, he resolves to steal Christmas from the Whos to alleviate his distress. He and Max acquire a fat reindeer, whom the Grinch calls Fred, and steal a sleigh from his neighbor Bricklebaum. After a test run, the Grinch and Max discover that Fred has a family, and the Grinch emotionally agrees to let Fred go home with them.

On Christmas Eve, after making a Santa Claus disguise and crafting dozens of gadgets to help him with his plan, the Grinch and Max, who pulls the sleigh in Fred's place, go down to Whoville to steal the decorations and presents. He soon encounters Cindy Lou after falling into her trap. Her request to help lighten her mother's workload and her advice about listening to the Whos' singing to alleviate his sadness touches the Grinch's heart. Despite this, the Grinch continues his mission, unable to let go of the loneliness Christmas brought him.

The Grinch and Max head back to Mount Crumpit to dispose of the gifts. The Whos wake up and are shocked and disappointed to see that the presents and decorations are gone. Cindy Lou believes that she is to blame because of her trap, but Donna tells her that Christmas is not centered on presents and that Cindy Lou is the greatest gift she has ever received. The Whos join to sing "Welcome Christmas", rendering the Grinch puzzled to see that they are celebrating Christmas despite his thefts. Seeing Cindy Lou and remembering her guidance, he immerses himself in their singing, causing his shrunken heart to triple in size.

Afterwards, the sleigh begins to fall off Mount Crumpit, and the Grinch attempts to save it. He succeeds when Fred and his family come to his aid. After securing the sleigh, the Grinch and Max slide down back to Whoville in order to return the stolen items, and the remorseful Grinch apologizes to the Whos before returning to his cave.

Feeling sorry for the Grinch, Cindy Lou later invites him and Max to celebrate Christmas at her house which he awkwardly attends. When seated for dinner, he realizes that it was not really Christmas he despised, but rather his solitude and bitterness over being neglected. With this, the Grinch finally accepts the Whos' friendship and enjoys Christmas with them with a toast.

== Voice cast ==
- Benedict Cumberbatch as the Grinch, a cave-dwelling, green-furred creature who hates Christmas.
- Cameron Seely as Cindy Lou Who, a kind-hearted young resident of Whoville.
- Rashida Jones as Donna Who, Cindy Lou's overworked single mother.
- Kenan Thompson as Bricklebaum, a jolly citizen of Whoville who lives near The Grinch and thinks that The Grinch is his best friend.
- Angela Lansbury as Mayor McGerkle, the Mayor of Whoville who oversees the tree-lighting ceremony.
- Pharrell Williams as the Narrator.
- Tristan O'Hare as Groopert, Cindy Lou's best friend.
- Sam Lavagnino as Ozzy, one of Cindy Lou's friends.
- Ramone Hamilton as Axl, one of Cindy Lou's friends.
- Scarlett Estevez as Izzy, one of Cindy Lou's friends.
- Michael Beattie as a store clerk.
- Bill Farmer as Sam, a bus driver who is friends with Donna.

A recording of Pentatonix' "God Rest You Merry Gentlemen" is used for the carolers who stalk the Grinch.

Georgia Toffolo provides the voice of Mrs. Toffee Apple (a customer who was trying to reach a jar of "Christmas chutney") in one scene in the UK release.

== Production ==
=== Development ===
In February 2013, Illumination was developing a 3D animated feature film based on the Dr. Seuss book, with the working title How the Grinch Stole Christmas, later shortened to The Grinch, with Peter Candeland attached to direct. In 2017, Yarrow Cheney joins Candeland to co-direct from a screenplay by Michael LeSieur and will be produced by Chris Meledandri, Janet Healy and Scott Mosier, whom directed the Sing short Eddie's Life Coach, while Audrey Geisel and Chris Renaud, whom previously directed Seuss' previous animated adaptation from Illumination, The Lorax, to executive produce.

However, in early 2018, Mosier took over from Candeland upon the trailer's release while Cheney remained onboard to co-direct the film, though Candeland was credited for Additional Story Direction after the film's release upon his contribution. Following the cast announcement for the film, Tommy Swerdlow was announced to co-write the screenplay with LeSieur while Puss in Boots producer Latifa Ouaou joined to executive produce alongside Geisel and Renaud.

This was the final Dr. Seuss film adaptation to be released during the lifetime of Seuss's widow Audrey Geisel, who served as executive producer of the film and died on December 19, 2018, five weeks after the film's release.

=== Casting ===
Benedict Cumberbatch was cast as the titular character in April 2016. Illumination originally wanted Cumberbatch to voice the Grinch in his natural accent, but Cumberbatch felt that since the rest of the cast is American, the Grinch himself should have an American accent. By September 2018, Angela Lansbury had been set to voice the Mayor of Whoville. Rashida Jones, Cameron Seely, and Kenan Thompson also joined the cast, while Pharrell Williams, who had previously worked on Illumination's Despicable Me films, was revealed to be narrating the film.

=== Animation ===
The animation was created by Illumination Mac Guff in Paris, France. Several software programs were used in creating the film's CGI characters including Maya, ZBrush, and Nuke as well as in-house software. A 3D CGI model of the town of Whoville through which a virtual camera could travel was crafted using Maya, ZBrush, Foundry's Mari, and Allegorithmic's Substance Painter.

== Music ==
Danny Elfman composed the film's score. Tyler, the Creator wrote a new song for the film titled "I Am the Grinch". Tyler and Elfman collaborated on a new version of the song "You're a Mean One, Mr. Grinch" for the film, which was featured in the final trailer, and early on in the film itself. The score and soundtrack albums were released (both digitally and on CD) and the film.

== Release ==
=== Theatrical ===
The film was originally scheduled to be released on November 10, 2017, but it was pushed back to November 9, 2018, almost a year after the film's original release date.

=== Marketing ===
Beginning in October, various billboards appeared for the film, each featuring an image of the Grinch, accompanied by a mean or ironic message. Universal and Illumination partnered with several companies to promote the film, including Wonderful Pistachios, Ebates, IHOP and 23andme for about $80 million worth of advertising. All-in-all the studio spent an estimated $121 million promoting the film worldwide. To promote the film, a giant inflatable balloon featuring the titular character first appeared at the 91st Macy's Thanksgiving Day Parade in New York City on November 23, 2017, 1 year ahead of its release. Later in December 2018, The Grinch and Max also made cameos in that year's WNBC/WNJU holiday sing along promo.

=== Home media ===
The film was released on Digital HD on January 22, 2019, and on DVD, Blu-ray, Blu-ray 3D, and Ultra HD Blu-ray on February 5. In addition to the short film Yellow is the New Black (which was released theatrically with the feature film), the releases also include two new short films: The Dog Days of Winter, and Santa's Little Helpers.

== Reception ==
=== Box office ===
The Grinch grossed $272.5 million in the United States and Canada, and $280.5 million in other countries, for a total worldwide gross of $553 million, against a production budget of $75 million. Deadline Hollywood calculated the film's net profit as $184.6 million, accounting for production budgets, marketing, talent participations, and other costs; box office grosses and home media revenues placed it ninth on their list of 2018's "Most Valuable Blockbusters". It was Universal's second best-performing film of 2018 behind Jurassic World: Fallen Kingdom.

In the United States and Canada, The Grinch was released alongside The Girl in the Spider's Web and Overlord, and was projected to gross $55–65 million from 4,140 theaters in its opening weekend. It made $18.7 million on its first day, including $2.2 million from Thursday night previews, more than the $1.7 million taken in by Illumination's Sing in 2016. It went on to debut to $67.6 million, finishing first at the box office and topping the 2000 film's $55 million opening. In its second weekend the film made $38.2 million, finishing second behind newcomer Fantastic Beasts: The Crimes of Grindelwald. In its third weekend the film made $30.2 million (including $42 million over the five-day Thanksgiving period), finishing fourth. In its fourth and fifth weekends, the film finished second behind Ralph Breaks the Internet, grossing $17.9 million and $15.0 million, respectively. It marked the first-ever time animated films were the top two films at the box office in back-to-back weekends.

=== Critical response ===
On review aggregator Rotten Tomatoes, the film holds an approval rating of 60% based on 197 reviews and an average rating of 6/10. The website's critical consensus reads, "The Grinch gives the classic Seuss source material a brightly animated update that's solidly suitable for younger viewers without adding substantially to the story's legacy." On Metacritic, the film has a weighted average score of 51 out of 100, based on 32 critics, indicating "mixed or average reviews". Audiences polled by CinemaScore gave the film an average grade of "A−" on an A+ to F scale, while PostTrak reported filmgoers gave it an 83% positive score and a 75% "definite recommend".

Alonso Duralde of TheWrap gave the film a positive review, calling it "full of warmth and wit" and writing, "Purists may balk about revisiting this tale, but The Grinch earns its laughter and its sentiment, both of which are plentiful. It's a full-throated Fah-Who-Foraze." Owen Gleiberman of Variety compared the film favorably to the 2000 live-action version, writing, "For anyone who grew up with How the Grinch Stole Christmas, The Grinch won't replace it, yet it's nimble and affectionate in a way that can hook today's children, and more than a few adults, by conjuring a feeling that comes close enough. By the end, your own heart will swell, though maybe just one or two sizes."

Glenn Kenny of The New York Times wrote, "Said dog, Max is the most charming character in this version, directed by Scott Mosier and Yarrow Cheney. The filmmakers keep the visuals merry and popping bright. Benedict Cumberbatch, voicing the Grinch, opts not to compete with Karloff at all, which is smart and speaks in an American accent, sounding rather like Bill Hader, which is confusing. A tepid hip-hop song about the Grinch plays over the end credits. It's by Tyler, the Creator, who only a few years ago was considered one of the saltiest (to put it mildly) voices in music. Here, his contribution is as toothless as the rest of the movie." Molly Freeman of Screen Rant gave the film a 3 out of 5 stars, saying "The Grinch may not be a necessary holiday movie, but fans of Dr. Seuss's story or holiday films, in general, will find plenty to like in this new animated retelling. Plus, with a variety of family-friendly jokes, The Grinch will no doubt entertain viewers young and old, though the 90-minute runtime does stretch thin in the third act of the movie. It's perhaps not worth seeing in IMAX, but The Grinch does provide some rich visuals that will also capture the eye of all moviegoers. The Grinch is holiday fun for the whole family, adapting a classic story with a new twist that makes for an altogether compelling moviegoing experience."

Sandie Angulo Chen of Common Sense Media gave the film 3/5 and stated, "This adaptation is bright, colorful, and occasionally funny, but it doesn't come close to matching the effectiveness of the short-and-sweet original." Amy West of Empire gave the film 3 out of 5 stars, writing "Despite its story-telling ambition being two sizes too small (much like its hairy protagonist's heart), The Grinch is impossibly cute, visually rich and boasts enough festive fun to satisfy young viewers."

=== Accolades ===
Year	Award	Category	Recipient(s)	Result	Ref.
2019	Annie Awards	Music in an Animated Feature Production	Danny Elfman and Tyler, The Creator	Nominated	
2019	Annie Awards	Storyboarding in an Animated Feature Production	Habib Louati	Nominated	
2019	Annie Awards	Editorial in an Animated Feature Production	Chris Cartagena	Nominated	
2019	Art Directors Guild	Production Design in an Animated Feature	Colin Stimpson	Nominated	
2019	Critics' Choice Awards	Best Animated Film	Scott Mosier and Yarrow Cheney	Nominated	
2019	Producers Guild of America Award	Outstanding Producer of Animated Theatrical Motion Picture	Chris Meledandri and Janet Healy	Nominated	
2019	Visual Effects Society Awards	Outstanding Visual Effects in an Animated Feature	Pierre Leduc, Janet Healy, Bruno Chauffard, Milo Riccarand	Nominated	
2019	Visual Effects Society Awards	Outstanding Animated Character in an Animated Feature	David Galante, Francois Boudaille, Olivier Luffin, Yarrow Cheney for The Grinch	Nominated	
2019	Visual Effects Society Awards	Outstanding Created Environment in an Animated Feature	Loic Rastout, Ludovic Ramiere, Henri Deruer, Nicolas Brack for Whoville	Nominated	
2019	Visual Effects Society Awards	Outstanding Effects Simulations in an Animated Feature	Eric Carme, Nicolas Brice, Milo Riccarand for Snow, Clouds and Smoke	Nominated	
2019	Movieguide Awards	Best Movies for Families	The Grinch	Won	
2019	Movieguide Awards	Epiphany Prize for Most Inspiring Movie	The Grinch	Nominated	
2019	Kids' Choice Awards	Favorite Animated Movie	The Grinch	Nominated	
2019	Kids' Choice Awards	Favorite Male Voice from an Animated Movie	Benedict Cumberbatch	Nominated	

== See also ==
- List of Christmas films
