= How the Grinch Stole Christmas! (TV special) =

1966 American animated television special based on the book by Dr. Seuss

- Print advertisement
- Genre: Christmas; Family; Comedy; Slapstick
- Based on: How the Grinch Stole Christmas! by Dr. Seuss
- Developed by: Chuck Jones
- Screenplay by: Dr. Seuss
- Directed by: Chuck Jones; Ben Washam
- Voices of: Boris Karloff; June Foray; Thurl Ravenscroft; Dallas McKennon
- Narrated by: Boris Karloff
- Composers: Albert Hague (songs); Eugene Poddany (additional music)
- Country of origin: United States
- Original language: English

Production
- Producers: Chuck Jones; Ted Geisel
- Editors: Lovell Norman; John O. Young
- Running time: 24 minutes
- Production companies: The Cat in the Hat Productions; MGM Animation/Visual Arts; MGM Television
- Budget: $315,000

Original release
- Network: CBS
- Release: December 18, 1966

Related
- Halloween Is Grinch Night; The Grinch Grinches the Cat in the Hat

How the Grinch Stole Christmas! (also known as Dr. Seuss' How the Grinch Stole Christmas!) is a 1966 American animated television special, directed and co-produced by Chuck Jones. Based on the children's book of the same name by Dr. Seuss, the special features the voice of Boris Karloff (who also narrated the special) as the Grinch. It tells the story of the Grinch, who tries to ruin Christmas for the townsfolk of Whoville below his mountain hideaway.

How the Grinch Stole Christmas! was produced by The Cat in the Hat Productions in association with the television and animation divisions of Metro-Goldwyn-Mayer Studios. It completed production in a year and originally aired in the United States on CBS on December 18, 1966. The special is considered a perennial holiday special.

== Plot ==
The Grinch is a cranky, grumpy, mean, surly, antisocial green creature with a heart "two sizes too small" who lives alone in a snowbound cave on the side of Mt. Crumpit, overlooking the town of Whoville. He especially hates Christmas and has always been annoyed by the town's noisy Christmas celebrations. On Christmas Eve, he finally decides to stop Christmas from coming to Whoville by disguising himself as Santa Claus, his dog Max as a reindeer and, in a reversal of Santa's visit, stealing all presents, decorations, and symbols of Christmas from the Whos. Once loaded, he plans on dumping the bags of stolen goods. He is noticed by a girl named Cindy Lou Who but is otherwise undetected.

As the Grinch reaches the icy summit of Mt. Crumpit, ready to dump the bags, he discovers that the Whos, despite having no gifts or decorations, have gathered in the middle of town to sing as Christmas Day dawns. Realizing that Christmas means more than just material possessions, the Grinch has a change of heart. As the sleigh begins to slip, he and Max attempt to grab it; the Grinch's heart grows three sizes and he saves the sleigh, returns the presents and decorations to the Whos, and joins in the town's Christmas celebration by carving the roast beast, with Cindy Lou Who giving Max the first slice.

== Voice cast ==
- Boris Karloff as the Grinch / Narrator
- June Foray as Cindy Lou Who (uncredited)
- Dallas McKennon as Max (uncredited)
- Thurl Ravenscroft as Vocalist ("You're a Mean One, Mr. Grinch") (uncredited)
- MGM Studio Chorus as Citizens of Whoville (uncredited)

== Production ==
=== Development ===
Animation director Chuck Jones and children's-book author Dr. Seuss (real name Theodor Geisel) had worked together on the Private Snafu training cartoons at Warner Bros. Cartoons during World War II. Jones was interested in adapting one of Geisel's books into a television special and approached him to turn How the Grinch Stole Christmas! into one in time for the holiday season. According to Jones, when he first read the book, his comment was that the Grinch was the best Christmas villain since Ebenezer Scrooge from A Christmas Carol. Although Geisel was initially reluctant, he agreed with Jones' idea.

During the process of storyboarding, Geisel and Jones worked closely at the MGM studio and Geisel's glass-enclosed eagle's nest in the neighborhood of La Jolla in San Diego, California, taking approximately two months to be finished. After storyboarding was finished, Jones went to New York City to sell the special to a sponsor. He presented the idea with the storyboard and acted all the parts 28 times. The special was bought by the Foundation For Full-Service Banks. CBS gave Jones and MGM a $315,000 budget (equivalent to $3,126,000 in 2025), more than four times what Bill Melendez was offered to produce A Charlie Brown Christmas. According to The Daily Herald-Tribune in 1992, it was a record for a cartoon at the time.

=== Voice cast ===
Jones and Geisel cast Boris Karloff to narrate the special because of his "beautiful, rhythmic, caring" voice and the poetic quality of the way he read the script. He also voiced the Grinch to ensure the voices of the Grinch and Cindy Lou Who were well received by fans. Jones described Karloff as "the only one [in mind]" because of his establishment of Rudyard Kipling's stories and others. Prior to its production, Karloff was eager to do the special since he had been a Dr. Seuss fan for several years. After recording, the sound engineers removed Karloff's high pitches to create the "gravelly grunt" of the Grinch's voice. June Foray provided the voice of Cindy Lou Who. She listened to Karloff's reading on earphones to maintain the same poetic quality.

=== Designs and animation ===
The Grinch's drawings were carefully done with Dr. Seuss's academic drawings. According to Chuck Jones, he stated that while drawing the Grinch, Ted Geisel (Dr. Seuss) said that he looked more like himself.

Since the special did not have a script, the special was presented visually. Jones and MGM assured Geisel that there would be no limit of quality on its animation. The animation for the special was followed carefully by sixteen rules on the guidelines of "good animation", which was applied to most of Chuck Jones' films. Most of the fully animated characters have implied skeletal structural and muscle movements. Approximately 15,000 drawings and cels, (Note: Two reliable sources say that 25,000 drawings were created for the special; it is uncertain which of the two figures is the more accurate.) 250 background drawings, 4,500 dispensable and unusable character layout drawings, and 1,200 character layout drawings were created for the special. Jones worked on more than 1,500 sketches to "bring [the characters] to life" and changed their physical appearances, although their personalities remained the same. Animators Ken Harris, Abe Levitow, Ben Washam, and Richard Thompson animated the special respectively.

The special was produced in color (as virtually all prime time television programs on major American networks were by 1966); in discussing possible colors for the Grinch, Jones and Geisel mutually agreed that there was no other choice except green. The job for animators was to animate the Grinch's movement in believability. Due to the lack of Grinch's skeletons, the Grinch's sketches were carefully drawn with Dr. Seuss's academic drawings. His movements were done by identifying the Grinch anatomically. Jones redesigned Cindy Lou Who as the "great-granddaughter" of the Grinch in appearance and, with great reluctance, pared her role down from the role he envisioned. According to Jones, the character Max was set up as an observer and victim in the same way as Porky Pig and Daffy Duck in Duck Dodgers or Robin Hood Daffy. Jones also added honesty, decency, and drama for the character to be relatable. The identity source for Max was Jones' childhood dog who was a young fox terrier. Animation production designer Maurice Noble established Whoville, the Whoville homes, the Grinch's hideaway, and the icy slopes of Mt. Crumpit. Because the book ran up to 12 minutes, additional scenes were created to extend the adaptation.

=== Music ===
The score consists of 60 musicians playing a 34-piece orchestra with a 12-voice choir. They worked for a total of eight hours. It included three songs: "Trim Up the Tree", "Welcome Christmas", and "You're a Mean One, Mr. Grinch". Jones questioned how to make a Christmas special without typical Christmas elements. Jones' answer: "Write our new carols in Seussian Latin. After all, 'Fahoofores, Dahoodores' seems to have as much authenticity as 'Adeste Fideles' to those untutored in Latin." The song "Trim Up the Tree" was written in a Polka square-dance type form by Albert Hague.

Because Thurl Ravenscroft was not credited in the closing credits as the singer of "You're a Mean One, Mr. Grinch", it is sometimes attributed to Boris Karloff. In his interview in TNT's In the Making Of: How the Grinch Stole Christmas! (1994), Ravenscroft revealed that Geisel neglected his screen credit. After becoming aware of this oversight, Geisel called Ravenscroft to apologize and later wrote letters to columnists nationwide telling them that it was Ravenscroft who provided vocals for the musical number.

== Soundtrack ==
How the Grinch Stole Christmas

Soundtrack album by various artists
- Released: December 18, 1966
- Genre: Christmas
- Length: 31:08 (original release)
- Label: Leo The Lion Records
- Producer: Jesse Kaye

On December 18, 1966, MGM released a soundtrack LP record in conjunction with the television special. In the recorded version, Boris Karloff does all voices including Cindy Lou Who. The song "You're a Mean One, Mr. Grinch", which comically describes the level of the Grinch's despicable nature, includes all verses with their original rhyming lyrics and the isolated song tracks have different durations due to being re-recorded. On October 3, 1995, Mercury Nashville released the soundtrack on CD.

On October 5, 1999, Rhino Entertainment released a new CD soundtrack (which included the soundtrack for another Dr. Seuss cartoon, Horton Hears a Who!). Both story collections contain selected dialogue and music numbers. The "isolated music tracks" in this edition are taken from the television soundtrack and are not the re-recorded tracks from earlier versions. The dialogues are the originals, being voiced by Boris Karloff for "Grinch" and Hans Conried for "Horton".

=== Original version (1966) ===
==== Side one ====
No.	Title	Performer	Length
1.	"How the Grinch Stole Christmas"	Boris Karloff	21:36
Total length:			21:36

==== Side two ====
All lyrics are written by Dr. Seuss; all music is composed by Albert Hague.

No.	Title	Performer(s)	Length
1.	"Welcome Christmas"	MGM Studio Chorus	1:41
2.	"Trim Up The Tree"	MGM Studio Chorus	1:18
3.	"You're a Mean One, Mr. Grinch"	Thurl Ravenscroft	2:56
4.	"Welcome Christmas (reprise)"	MGM Studio Chorus	3:35
Total length:			9:30

=== Television soundtrack (1999) ===
All tracks were narrated by Boris Karloff and performed by the MGM Studio Orchestra. Most of the songs were performed by the MGM Studio Chorus, with the exceptions of "You're A Mean One, Mr. Grinch" and "You're A Mean One, Mr. Grinch (Reprise)", performed by Thurl Ravenscroft.

==== The Story ====
No.	Title	Length
1.	"Opening"	1:29
2.	"Trim Up The Tree"	0:45
3.	"Tomorrow Is Christmas, It's Practically Here"	4:11
4.	"Welcome Christmas"	0:46
5.	"I Must Stop Christmas"	0:59
6.	"You're A Mean One, Mr. Grinch"	5:15
7.	"You're A Mean One, Mr. Grinch (Reprise)"	5:15
8.	"A Quarter of Dawn"	1:43
9.	"Welcome Christmas (Reprise)"	2:52
10.	"Finale"	3:06

==== Isolated Music Tracks ====
No.	Title	Length
1.	"Opening"
2.	"Trim Up The Tree"
3.	"Welcome Christmas"
4.	"You're A Mean One, Mr. Grinch"

== Broadcast ==
How the Grinch Stole Christmas! was originally telecast in the United States on CBS on December 18, 1966. The original broadcasts from 1966 to 1970 were sponsored by the Foundation for Full Service Banks, whose sponsor plugs within the special were edited out for subsequent broadcasts after 1970. In 1971, How the Grinch Stole Christmas! was sponsored by Nabisco Inc. and Reynold Metals Company.

CBS repeated it annually during the Christmas season until 1988. After Turner Broadcasting System bought the pre-May 1986 MGM library in 1986, it was transferred to its cable network TNT, which debuted on the network on December 9, 1989. It was also broadcast on TBS and Cartoon Network. The WB returned it to broadcast television by adding its own annual screening in 2001. ABC took over the special after The WB ceased operations in 2006. NBC acquired the rights in 2015; its deal with Warner Bros. Television Studios allows two broadcasts per season. The Christmas night broadcast which traditionally aired at 8:00 p.m. in all time zones except for Puerto Rico and the U.S. Virgin Islands which airs at 9:00 PM AST (due to NBC affiliates in these territories using the Eastern Time Zone feed) has been later followed by the airing of the 2000 film of the same name. In 2022, the second airing of the special was aired on December 23 instead of Christmas Day due to a National Football League (NFL) game between the Tampa Bay Buccaneers and Arizona Cardinals. Both TBS and TNT continue to air the special many times presently during the holiday season due to the channels' complete ownership through Warner Bros. Television.

== Reception ==
=== Critical response ===
Upon its initial broadcast, it received generally positive but muted reviews from critics. Roy Shields of The Toronto Star called the special "perfect", praising it as "faithful to the artistry of Dr. Seuss". A review on The Macon Telegraph recommended the program, describing it as a "superb, delightful, and tender animated presentation of Dr. Seuss's beloved children's book." Syndicated columnist Rick Du Brow, while taken aback at the special's cost compared to others in its genre, admitted that it was "as good as most of the other holiday cartoons" and found the special's optimistic ending to be "reassuring", stating "I can't see why anyone would dislike it." John Heisner of Democrat and Chronicle called the special a "fascinating bit of fantasy with a simple message". Hal Humphrey of The Los Angeles Times called the special a "disappointment". Though Humphrey described the result as "much too mild", he praised the animation and music. Jack Gould of The New York Times praised the animation, but criticized the result as a "creation that should be left undisturbed on the printed page." He further stated that it is "one of the rare children's shows that are really interesting to adults." Barbara Delatiner of Newsday criticized the special as "more elusive" and a "disappointment", describing the characters as "[not] half as funny [as they were in the book]". A 1970 "Top View" survey of viewers published by Clarke Williamson ranked the show with a 70.2 "good" score, ahead of Frosty the Snowman but lower than A Charlie Brown Christmas, The Little Drummer Boy and Rudolph the Red-Nosed Reindeer.

Throughout the years, it has since been regarded as a Christmas classic. The special has an approval rating of 100% on Rotten Tomatoes based on 27 professional reviews, with an average rating of 9.2/10. The critical consensus reads: "How the Grinch Stole Christmas brings an impressive array of talent to bear on an adaptation that honors a classic holiday story – and has rightfully become a yuletide tradition of its own." Jeffrey Westhoff of Northwest Herald rated the special a perfect five out of five, stating that "Christmas isn't Christmas without the Grinch." Derek James of Time Out called it a "seasonal classic". The A.V Club stated that the special "works because of its surprisingly sentimental climax".

=== Ratings ===
After its initial airing, How the Grinch Stole Christmas! was ranked at No. 6 on television during the period between December 5–18, 1966, by Nielsen Media Research. A year later, it was ranked at No. 2 (behind a rerun of A Charlie Brown Christmas) during the period between December 4–17, 1967. The special continues to be popular in Nielsen ratings, with its 2010 airing (the last of many times it had aired that year) winning its time slot among persons 18 to 49 and finishing second in overall viewers.

== Home media ==
How the Grinch Stole Christmas! was first released as part of the Dr. Seuss Video Festival on VHS, CED, Laserdisc, and Betamax in 1982. It was reissued several times throughout the '80s and '90s. The special was released to the VHS and DVD formats in 1999 and 2000 by Warner Home Video, which acquired the pre-May 1986 MGM library in the 1996 via their purchase of Turner Entertainment Co. MGM had earlier released it on DVD in 1998. The 2000 DVD release featured another Seuss-based special, Horton Hears a Who!, while the 2000 DVD also added an audio commentary by lead animator Phil Roman and June Foray, interviews with Albert Hague and Thurl Ravenscroft, and the "Special Edition" documentary which aired alongside the special on TNT in 1994. The DVD was well-received for these bonus features, but also criticized for its sub-par picture quality; many critics pointed out that the Grinch looked yellow, not green, in this release.

The special was re-released on DVD in 2006 and labeled as a "50th Birthday Deluxe Edition". That labeling refers to the 1957 date of the book's publication rather than to the date of the 1966 TV special. This DVD release featured a new retrospective featurette and contained all the bonus features from the previous release, except for the audio commentary, and the Grinch was restored to his original green color. This edition is also available as part of the four-disc Classic Christmas Favorites box set. The special was again re-released on DVD with Phil Roman's and June Foray's audio commentary replacing the Horton Hears a Who! bonus special. The special was released on high definition Blu-ray Disc in 2009 with the title changed to Dr. Seuss' How the Grinch Stole Christmas!. It contained all the bonus features from the 2000 DVD, except for Horton Hears a Who!, and also included a DVD of the special and a digital copy. On October 18, 2011, It featured on the Dr. Seuss: Holidays On The Loose! DVD set, along with Halloween Is Grinch Night and The Grinch Grinches the Cat in the Hat.

== Legacy ==
In 2004, TV Guide ranked the special No. 1 on its 10 Best Family Holiday Specials list. In 2022, Fatherly included the special on its list of the 100 best family-friendly films widely available to the public, one of only two productions made for television (A Charlie Brown Christmas being the other).

== Prequels and follow-ups ==
A television special called Halloween Is Grinch Night, created by DePatie–Freleng Enterprises, aired on ABC in 1977, eleven years after the Christmas special. This special involved a tale of the Grinch coming down to haunt the Whos every Halloween. Though less successful than the original, it was awarded an Emmy. A later cartoon, The Grinch Grinches the Cat in the Hat (alternatively titled The Cat in the Hat Gets Grinched), aired on ABC in 1982. Though credited to DePatie–Freleng, it was produced by Marvel Productions, which had taken over DePatie–Freleng in 1981.

== See also ==
- Grammy Award for Best Album for Children
- List of Christmas films
- How the Grinch Stole Christmas (2000 film)
- The Grinch (film)

== Sources ==
- Jones, Chuck (1996). Chuck Reducks: Drawing From the Fun Side of Life. Warner Books. ISBN 0-446-51893-X.
