= Things Which Have Never Yet Been Done =

- Orphan Black episode
- Episode no.: Season 2 Episode 9
- Directed by: TJ Scott
- Written by: Alex Levine
- Original air date: 14 June 2014
- Running time: 43 minutes

Guest appearances
- Michael Mando as Vic; Michelle Forbes as Dr. Marian Bowles; Peter Outerbridge as Henrik Johanssen; Skyler Wexler as Kira; Kristian Bruun as Donnie Hendrix; Inga Cadranel as Detective Angela DeAngelis; Josh Vokey as Scott; Julian Richings as Benjamin Kertland; Ari Millen as Mark Rollins; Zoé de Grand'Maison as Gracie Johanssen; Andrew Gillies as Ethan Duncan; Kathryn Alexandre as Alexis; Millie Davis as Gemma Hendrix; Drew Davis as Oscar Hendrix; Dan MacDonald as Martin Funt; Sadie Munroe as Faith; Anita La Selva as Dr. Parks

Episode chronology
← Previous "Variable and Full of Perturbation"	Next → "By Means Which Have Never Yet Been Tried"

"Things Which Have Never Yet Been Done" is the ninth episode of the second season, and the nineteenth episode overall, of the Canadian science fiction television series Orphan Black. It first aired in Canada on Space and the United States on BBC America on 14 June 2014. The episode was written by Alex Levine and directed by TJ Scott.

The series focuses on a number of identical human clones, all of whom are played by Tatiana Maslany: Sarah Manning, Alison Hendrix, Cosima Niehaus, Rachel Duncan, and Helena. In this episode, Sarah's daughter Kira (Skyler Wexler) undergoes bone marrow extraction to donate to Cosima in an attempt to cure Cosima's illness. Alison and her husband Donnie (Kristian Bruun) attempt to bury Dr. Aldous Leekie's body, while Helena attempts to escape from the ranch of the Proletheans, a religious extremist group.

"Things Which Have Never Yet Been Done" marked the first on-screen appearance of Kathryn Alexandre, who also works on the show as Maslany's "clone double" when filming scenes where multiple clones interact. The episode was filmed at various locations in Toronto and the title was taken from Francis Bacon's work Novum Organum. It was watched by 613,000 viewers in the United States and received mostly positive reviews from critics.

== Plot ==
At the Dyad Institute, Rachel appoints Delphine Cormier (Evelyne Brochu) the interim director of the cloning program following the death of Dr. Aldous Leekie. Delphine meets with Sarah to ask if her young daughter, Kira, will donate her bone marrow to help cure Cosima's illness, and Kira agrees. Meanwhile, Cosima works with her lab assistant Scott (Josh Vokey) and Rachel's adoptive father Ethan (Andrew Gillies), a founder scientist of the cloning program, to find the genetic sequence that has caused her illness. Rachel, who is usually stoic, laughs and sobs whilst watching home videos of her childhood, lamenting her own infertility. Disguised as Sarah, she tricks her way into the pediatric clinic where Kira is recovering and sedates Sarah's foster brother Felix (Jordan Gavaris). She abducts Kira and takes her to a young girl's bedroom in the Dyad Institute, telling Kira that she "may even grow to like it here, just as I did".

After confessing that he accidentally murdered Dr. Leekie, Donnie Hendrix and his wife Alison decide to dispose of the dead body under the cement of their garage floor. They are interrupted by Vic (Michael Mando), whom Alison met in rehab and who is acting as an informant to Detective Angie DeAngelis (Inga Cadranel). Donnie threatens to shoot Vic, who confesses that Angie is parked nearby, before walking into Angie's van and threatening to destroy her career if she continues to stalk his family, taking a picture of her with Vic as blackmail. After burying Leekie's body and re-laying the cement, Alison confesses her sudden attraction to Donnie and they have sex in the garage.

At the ranch inhabited by the Proletheans, a religious extremist group, following her impregnation, Helena is introduced to the group's nursery where she bonds with a young girl. The Prolethean leader, Henrik Johanssen (Peter Outerbridge), impregnates his teenage daughter Gracie (Zoé de Grand'Maison) with his and Helena's embryos. Sharing their displeasure with what Henrik has done, Helena and Gracie decide to flee the ranch together, but are caught by Henrik as they are preparing to leave. Henrik's protégé and Gracie's lover, Mark (Ari Millen), arrives to defend Gracie. Mark and Gracie flee together as Helena attacks Henrik. Helena tortures Henrik with his own medical instruments before burning down the ranch and running away herself.

== Production ==
Kathryn Alexandre appeared for the first time in this episode as Alexis, a Prolethean midwife. After working as a script reader during Orphan Black's initial auditions, Alexandre began working as Maslany's "clone double": playing opposite Maslany in any scene when multiple clones interact and being replaced with Maslany in post-production. Fawcett and Manson had planned to cast Alexandre in her own role from the start of the show's second season, and had considered casting her as Gracie before deciding that, due to the amount of interaction between Gracie and Helena (played by Maslany), it would "turn into a mess if we cast her". They decided to find a smaller role for Alexandre and eventually settled on the part of Alexis.

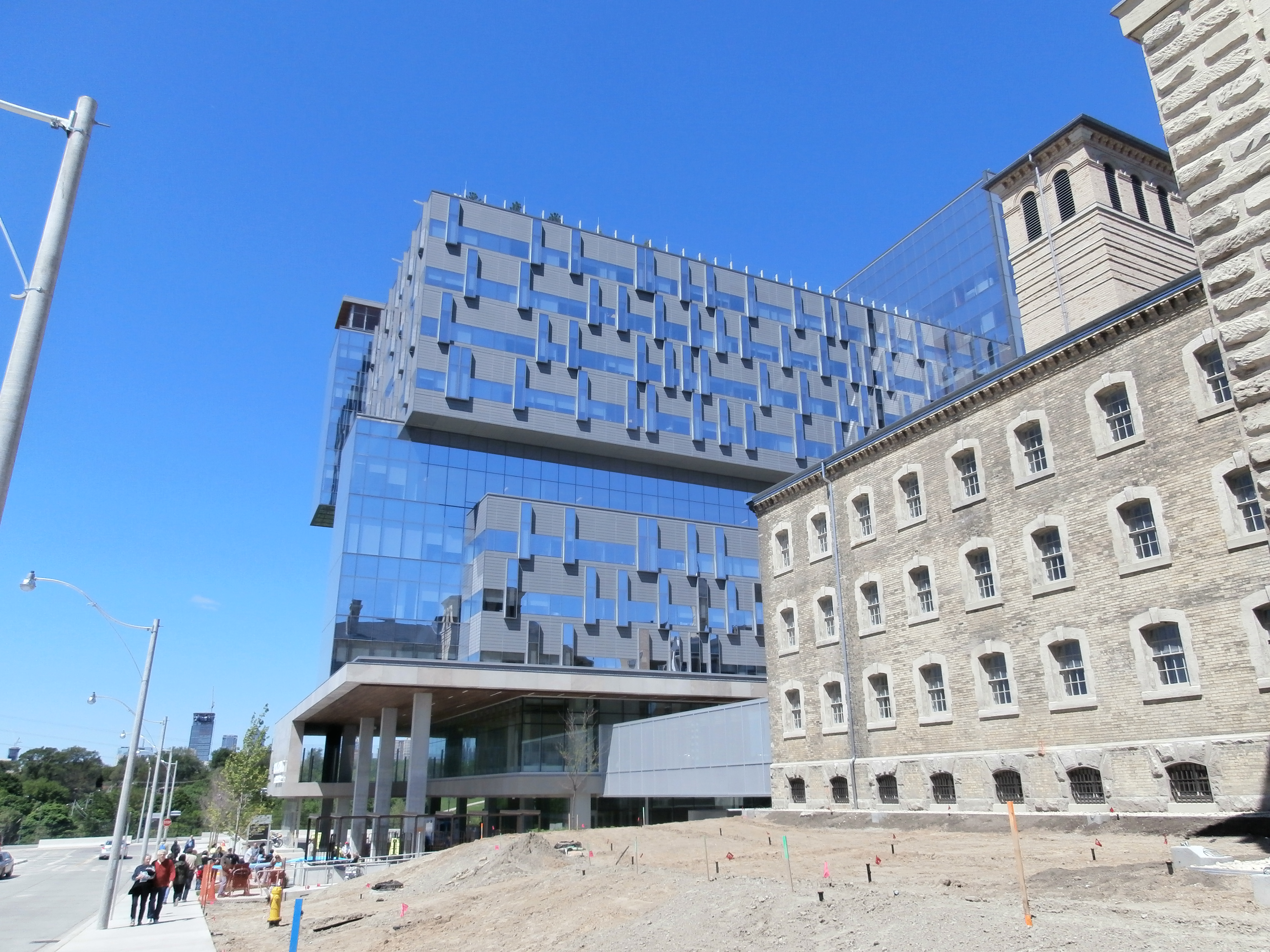
Some scenes from the episode were filmed at the Bridgepoint Health Centre (left) and the Don Jail (right).

The scenes in the Hendrixes' garage were filmed on a set; the set replicated the real garage of a house in Markham, Ontario which had been used for filming in the show's first season. The set was built 4 feet (1.2 m) above the ground so that it could be excavated with a jackhammer on film. Bridgepoint Health Centre stood in as the clinic where Kira underwent bone marrow extraction, and was also used for exterior shots of the Dyad Institute. Scenes at Cosima's laboratory were filmed at the Don Jail, now an administrative facility connected to Bridgepoint. The montage of Rachel drinking martinis and watching home videos from her childhood was not originally included in the episode's script, nor was it filmed with the rest of the episode. According to Fawcett, when he and Manson viewed the final cut of the episode, they felt that something was missing from Rachel's subplot. Manson then scripted the short sequence and Fawcett filmed it over two days during the production of the next episode. Due to time constraints while filming the scene in which Helena tortures Henrik, the scene was shot with a handheld camera by the episode's director, TJ Scott, with Maslany and Outerbridge improvising the dialogue and use of props. The subsequent shot of the barn on fire was created by the visual effects company Intelligent Creatures. The title of the final two episodes, "Things Which Have Never Yet Been Done" and "By Means Which Have Never Yet Been Tried", are taken from a Francis Bacon quotation in his philosophical work Novum Organum: "It would be an unsound fancy and self-contradictory to expect that things which have never yet been done can be done except by means which have never yet been tried."

== Reception ==
The episode was aired in the United States on 14 June 2014 on BBC America. It was watched by 613,000 viewers, with a Nielsen rating of 0.27 in the demographic of adults aged 18–49.

Matt Brennan of Slant Magazine summarised the episode as being "among the best hours of television I've seen so far this year" and an example of "unrelenting brilliance". He praised the exploration of Rachel's character and especially Maslany's "nothing short of masterful" performance in the role, and described the satire of suburbia presented through Alison and Donnie as "impeccably wry". Writing for The A.V. Club, Caroline Framke gave the episode an A− grade and found it much more focused and with more of an "emotional core" than the preceding episode. She highlighted the "gorgeous" cinematography, the chemistry between Maslany and Bruun as Alison and Donnie, and the "stunning" montage of Rachel's emotional breakdown. IGN's Eric Goldman has described the episode as a "very busy, very strong" episode and among the best of the season. He praised the "darkly funny" storyline involving Alison and Donnie, although he found the pacing of some of the subplots to be rushed.

Paste critic Mark Rozeman gave the episode a rating of 8.4 out of 10, commending Bruun's performance as Donnie and the "wonderful bit of Coen Brothers-esque dark comedy" provided by Alison's subplot. However, he criticised the predictability of the episode and opined that Kira's abduction by Rachel felt like a recycled plot point from the first season. Vlada Gelman gave the episode a mixed review for TVLine, writing that it was the first episode of the show's second season "that didn't quite work" and "it didn't have the momentum and progress you'd expect from a penultimate hour". Similarly, The New York Times's Adam W. Kepler opined that the episode displayed Orphan Black's "finest qualities (strong characterisation, dark satire and shocking moments) and its worst (odd pacing and ropey plotting)". He enjoyed Alison and Donnie's comedic subplot and praised Maslany's performance as Rachel, but found the conclusion to Helena's storyline with the Proletheans "baffling" and "haphazard".
