= In Strange Woods =

2020 musical podcast

- Genre: Musical; Drama
- Created by: Jeff Luppino-Esposito; Brett Ryback; Matt Sav
- Starring: Lily Mae Harrington; Brett Ryback; Patrick Page; Donna Lynne Champlin; Michaela Watkins; Beth Leavel
- Country of origin: United States
- Original language: English
- No. of episodes: 5

Production
- Executive producers: Matt Sav; Jeff Luppino-Esposito; Brett Ryback; Lauren Shippen; Briggon Snow
- Running time: 35–57 minutes
- Production company: Atypical Artists

Original release
- Release: December 14, 2020 – January 11, 2021

In Strange Woods is an American musical fiction podcast produced by Atypical Artists and created by Jeff Luppino-Esposito, Brett Ryback, and Matt Sav. The series is told in the style of a true crime documentary with an original folk-pop score.

It was nominated for Best Fiction Podcast at the 2022 iHeart Radio Podcast Awards.

== Premise ==
After the tragic death of her brother in the Whitetail National Forest, 18-year-old Peregrine Wells seeks survivalist skills from the enigmatic old recluse who found her brother's body.

== Cast and characters ==
=== Starring ===
- Brett Ryback as Brett Ryback (a fictionalized version of himself)
- Lily Mae Harrington as Peregrine Wells
- Donna Lynne Champlin as Kathy Wells
- Patrick Page as Peter "Howl" Howland
- Larry Bates as Donald Van Calcar
- Michaela Watkins as Irene O'Connor
- Kristian Bruun as Declan O'Connor
- Jonah Platt as Sheriff Neal Porter
- Ryan Alexander Holmes as John Francis Van Calcar
- Lana McKissack as Lexy DeKoenig
- Philip Labes as Shane "Woodsley" O'Connor
- Briggon Snow as Eric Miller
- Raymond J. Lee as Bobber Andersen
- Lauren Shippen as Gerda Pulnik
- Beth Leavel as Sandra Pierce

=== Additional voices ===
- Julia Addis as Vicky, Party Mom
- Christian Barillas as Derek Rodriguez, Party Man
- Jamison Haase as Bait, Fordham
- Jeff Luppino-Esposito as Party Dad
- Vanessa Mizzone as Party Woman
- Brent Pope as Tackle
- Danielle Robay as Chelsea Hamilton
- Matt Sav as "Happy Times" Vocalist

== Episodes ==
No.	Title	Directed by	Written by	Original release date
1	"A Man Who Cannot Be Saved"	Jeff Luppino-Esposito	Brett Ryback & Jeff Luppino-Esposito	December 14, 2020
2	"Dead Reckoning"	Jeff Luppino-Esposito	Jeff Luppino-Esposito	December 21, 2020
3	"Alone"	Jeff Luppino-Esposito	Brett Ryback	December 28, 2020
4	"The Man I Remember"	Jeff Luppino-Esposito	Brett Ryback	January 4, 2021
5	"The Final"	Jeff Luppino-Esposito	Jeff Luppino-Esposito	January 11, 2021

== Production ==
=== Music and sound ===
The series features original music composed by Matt Sav and Brett Ryback, with lyrics by Ryback and Jeff Luppino-Esposito. Matt Sav and Evan Cunningham produced the music, and it was mixed and mastered by Cunningham.

Nicholas Quah of Vulture said of the show's sound that it "carries Spring Awakening vibes in its musical performances." Maureen Lee Lenker, writing for EW, commented that the score "draws more on the sound of The Decemberists or Sufjan Stevens than theatrical composers."

Sound design for the series was by Brandon Grugle and Stephen Jensen, and it was edited by Lauren Shippen and Jeff Luppino-Esposito.

=== Recording ===
The original pilot for the series was recorded in 2018, featuring many of the show's eventual stars, including Donna Lynne Champlin, Patrick Page, and Lily Mae Harrington.

After teaming up with Atypical Artists, In Strange Woods was recorded remotely during the 2020 lockdown for the COVID-19 pandemic.

== Release ==
=== Podcast ===
The series premiered on December 14, 2020, on all major podcast platforms.

=== Cast album ===
A cast album of original songs from the series was released independently through Atypical Artists on March 11, 2021.

== Reception ==
=== Critical response ===
In Strange Woods received positive critical attention from The New York Times, The Guardian, The Wall Street Journal, and the BBC. The series currently has a 4.9 rating out of 5 on Spotify and a 4.4 out of 5 on Apple Podcasts.

Speaking to the show's format, Miranda Sawyer of The Guardian described it as "A musical drama that actually works," going on to say, "I am not a fan of musicals, but somehow this ambitious drama transcends." Rob Herting, CEO of Qcode Media writing for The Wall Street Journal, commented on the podcast's "part docu-fiction, part straight fiction and part musical" format, saying, "I love the ambition of it." And Ella Watts of the BBC 4 Podcast Radio Hour said, "on paper it shouldn't work, but it does here."

Other critics have focused on the work of the cast, including Phoebe Lett of The New York Times who said "the vocal performances are beautiful," and Chloe Rabinowitz of Broadway World who said that guest star Beth Leavel "makes a fierce dramatic turn with her tour-de-force performance."

On October 13, 2021, it was announced that In Strange Woods was nominated for Best Fiction Podcast at the 2022 iHeart Radio Podcast Awards.
