= Variable and Full of Perturbation =

- Orphan Black episode
- Tony, a transgender clone, as portrayed by Tatiana Maslany
- Episode no.: Season 2 Episode 8
- Directed by: John Fawcett
- Written by: Karen Walton
- Original air date: 7 June 2014
- Running time: 43 minutes

Guest appearances
- Skyler Wexler as Kira Manning; Kristian Bruun as Donnie Hendrix; Andrew Gillies as Ethan Duncan; Josh Vokey as Scott Smith; Julian Richings as Benjamin Kertland; Bishop Brigante as Sammy; Danny MacDonald as Martin Funt; Joey Lucius as Doomsday; Allen Keng as Painmaker; Drew Davis as Oscar Hendrix; Millie Davis as Gemma Hendrix

Episode chronology
← Previous "Knowledge of Causes, and Secret Motion of Things"	Next → "Things Which Have Never Yet Been Done"

"Variable and Full of Perturbation" is the eighth episode of the second season, and the eighteenth episode overall, of the Canadian science fiction television series Orphan Black. It first aired in Canada on Space and the United States on BBC America on 7 June 2014. The episode was written by Karen Walton and directed by the series' co-creator John Fawcett.

The series focuses on a number of identical human clones, all of whom are played by Tatiana Maslany: Sarah Manning, Alison Hendrix, Cosima Niehaus and Rachel Duncan. This episode introduces a new clone, Tony Sawicki (Maslany), a transgender man whose search for another clone leads him to Sarah's foster brother Felix Dawkins (Jordan Gavaris). Meanwhile, the founder of the cloning program, Professor Ethan Duncan (Andrew Gillies), meets with his adoptive daughter Rachel and attempts to find a cure for Cosima's illness, while Alison and her husband Donnie (Kristian Bruun) attempt to hide a dead body.

The show's co-creators, Fawcett and Graeme Manson, along with Maslany and her hair and makeup artists, developed the character of Tony over a period of six months after deciding that the inclusion of a transgender character would fit well with the show's themes of identity, gender and sexuality. Overall, the episode received mixed reviews: critics praised Maslany's performance but found Tony's character underdeveloped and gimmicky and found the plot disorganised.

== Plot ==
The episode opens with Tony Sawicki rushing his friend Sammy, who has just been shot, to an empty warehouse. Before dying, Sammy implores Tony to find Beth Childs and pass on a message to her. Not knowing that Beth is dead, Tony's call to Beth's phone is answered by her former partner, suspended detective Art Bell, who brings Tony to Felix. Realising that Tony is a transgender clone of his foster sister Sarah Manning, Felix ascertains that Tony is unaware of his origins, but refuses to impart any information until Sarah arrives. After Sarah arrives at Felix's apartment and explains to Tony that they are clones, he is unflustered. He passes on Sammy's message for Beth, although neither Sarah or Felix understand what it means. Felix gives Tony his, Sarah and Art's phone numbers and shares a kiss with Tony before he leaves again.

Alison Hendrix returns home from rehab to find her husband Donnie drunk and chastises him. When she catches him trying to leave the house in the middle of the night, she persuades him not to give up on their marriage. In an effort to open up to him, she confesses that she played a role in the death of their neighbour Aynsley, and is shocked when Donnie responds by confessing that he accidentally shot and killed Dr. Aldous Leekie, the director of the Dyad Institute, the night before. When Alison asks what he did with Leekie's body, Donnie leads her to their garage where Leekie's corpse is wrapped in the trunk of their car.

Rachel Duncan, who works for the Dyad Institute, promotes Delphine Cormier to the role formerly held by Leekie, who had been ordered dead when Rachel let him escape the previous night, with the official cover story that he died of a heart attack on a private jet. Rachel sets Delphine the task of convincing Professor Ethan Duncan—a founding scientist of the clone program and Rachel's adoptive father—to come into Dyad to help find a cure for the illness that has befallen Cosima Niehaus, another clone. When Ethan arrives, Rachel questions him about why she cannot reproduce, and he reveals that all of the clones were intended to be infertile by design. In response, she breaks down in anger and trashes her office.

Also working at the Dyad Institute, Cosima refuses to work with her girlfriend and monitor Delphine after Delphine's recent betrayal. They later reunite and get high in their laboratory together, after which they profess their love for each other. Before Ethan arrives at Dyad to meet Cosima, she confesses to her lab assistant Scott that the clone subject they are researching is in fact herself. Shortly after meeting Ethan, Cosima begins to cough and vomit blood before falling to the ground and seizing.

== Production ==
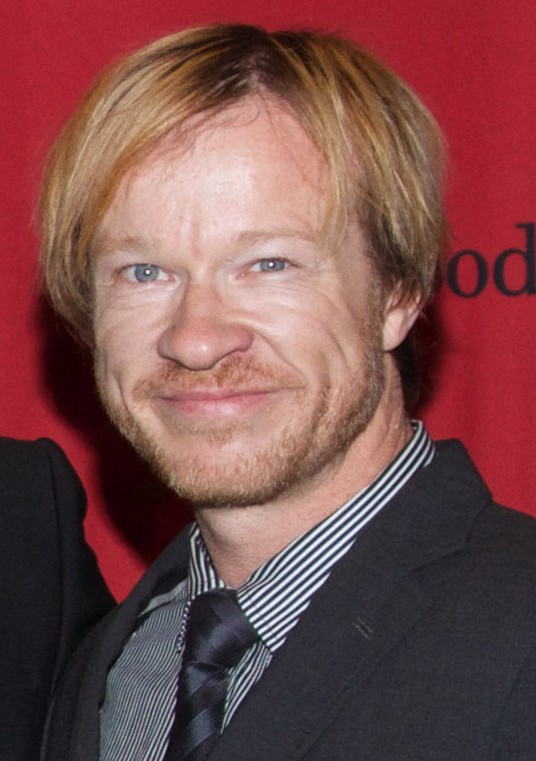
John Fawcett (pictured) and Graeme Manson spent more time developing Tony's character than any other character on the show.

The episode introduced Tony Sawicki, a trans man and another clone played by Maslany. The character was first imagined by Manson and Fawcett during the development of the show's first season; they thought that introducing a transgender clone character would be "very tied to the themes of our show about identity" and would fit well with the previous season's themes of gender and sexuality. When they approached Maslany with the idea at the end of the first season, she told them that she had already thought about playing a transgender character herself. It took the show's creators longer than with any other character to develop and refine Tony's personality and wardrobe, the entire process taking six months. In preparation for the part, Maslany researched and met with transgender people and grew out her underarm hair for six weeks, although she eventually had to shave her underarms to attend an awards ceremony before the episode was filmed. The new character was kept secret from most of the crew until scripts for the episode were distributed, and the show's hair and makeup department trialled different looks for Tony on Maslany's days off and weekends so that other members of the crew would not see her in Tony's costume. Tony's final look was created by Stephen Lynch, Sandy Sokolowski and Debra Hanson, in the show's makeup, hair and wardrobe departments, respectively. Manson, Fawcett and Maslany sought advice from GLAAD on how to best go about introducing a transgender character. In response to the perception that Tony's introduction had created "a minefield of sexual politics", Fawcett said that that had not been the writers' intention; rather, their aim was to "just throw this character in there and treat them like a normal human being like we would anyone else on the show".

Unlike most other episodes, the scenes which featured multiple clones were filmed using traditional locked-off cameras rather than the time-consuming Technodolly camera set-up. The episode featured the longest continuous shot filmed in Orphan Black, where a scene between Felix, Tony and Sarah was filmed in one take. It took almost three days to film the 15-second sequence of Scott drilling into Kira's tooth, involving three rented cameras and a prop tooth that was painted red inside and filled with white dust to achieve the desired effect when drilled into. The scene in which Cosima and Delphine use a vaporiser to get high was mostly improvised by Maslany and Brochu; instead of inhaling actual helium, the pitch of their voices was altered in post-production. A stunt double was used for the second-to-last scene, wherein Cosima falls to the ground after vomiting blood.

The episode features Cosima and her lab assistant Scott playing the board game Runewars. Fawcett, who describes himself as "a massive board game fan", contacted the game's creators at Fantasy Flight Games for permission to use Runewars in the show and employed one of his friends as a consultant for the episode. As a consultant, his friend set up the board for the scene, taught the involved actors how to play the game, checked for accuracy of the gameplay and dialogue about the game, and had a non-speaking cameo appearance in the scene as one of the board game players. Manson chose to incorporate H. G. Wells' science fiction novel The Island of Doctor Moreau, which Ethan Duncan reads to Kira, into the episode since he felt that the novel's themes "run so deep in our show". The book cover featured in the episode was designed by the show's art department. The episode's title, "Variable and Full of Perturbation", is taken from a quote from Francis Bacon's philosophical work Novum Organum: "the spirit of man (according as it is meted out to different individuals) is in fact a thing variable and full of perturbation, and governed as it were by chance."

== Reception ==
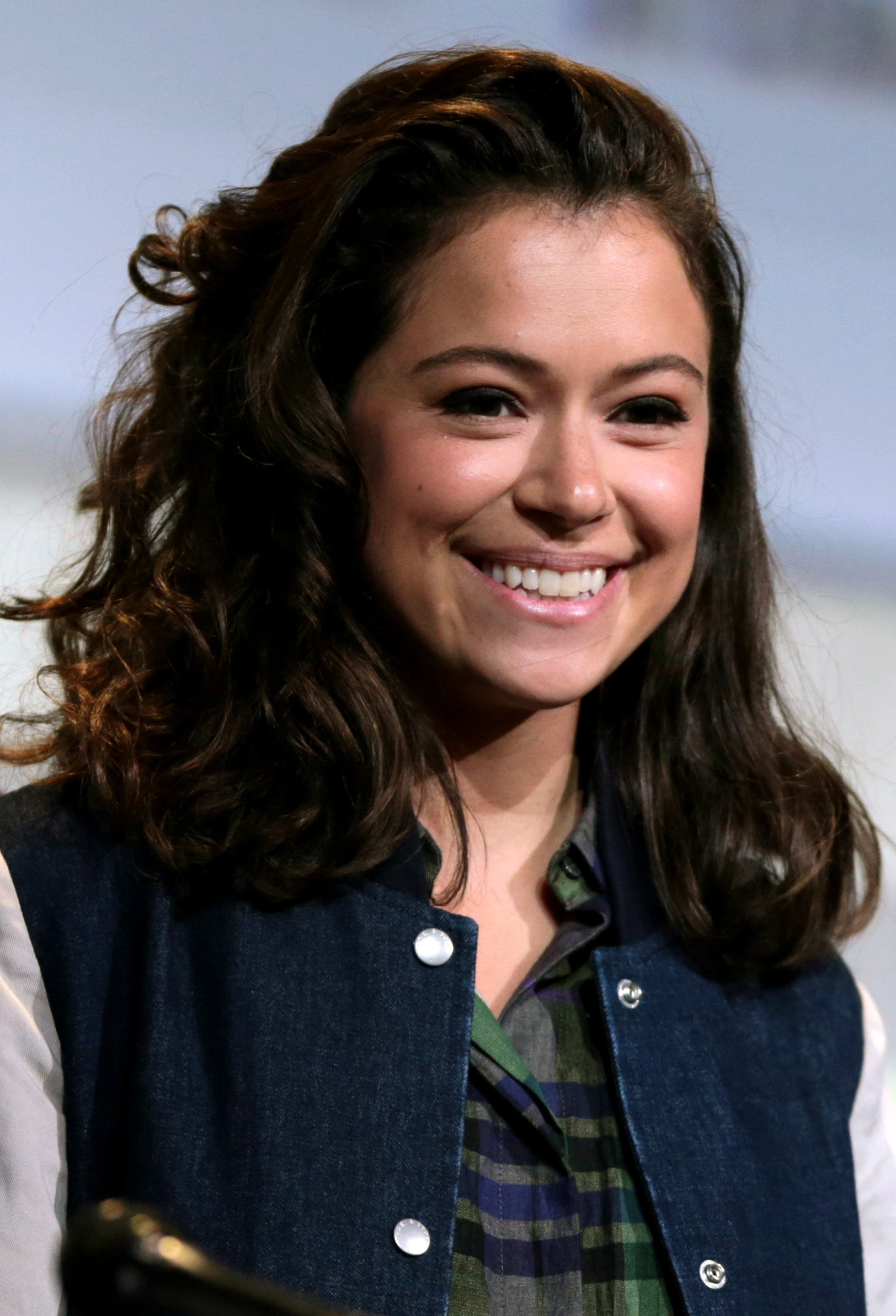
Critics praised Tatiana Maslany's performance in the episode.

The episode was aired in the United States on 7 June 2014 on BBC America. It was watched by 576,000 viewers and was the 14th most-watched program of the night. It ranked ninth for the night in the key demographic of viewers aged 18–49, with a Nielsen rating of 0.27.

"Variable and Full of Perturbation" received mixed reviews from critics. Mark Rozeman, writing for Paste, gave the episode a rating of 6.9 out of 10 and, despite enjoying several storylines, described the introduction of Tony as "perhaps the biggest misstep in the show's brief history". He felt that the kiss between Tony and Felix was an example of "taboo-pushing gimmickry" and summarised the episode as "strange experimental tangent". Slant Magazine critic Matt Brennan found the episode "jumbled and strange" but felt that the introduction of Tony was a "delightful twist". He said that Cosima's storyline taking place at the Dyad Institute felt "dry and utilitarian, as though the writers realized they better get their shit together in time to wrap things up". The A.V. Club's Caroline Framke gave the episode a C− grade and criticised the "chaotic script", "aggressively flashy direction" and the failed attempts to integrate the "wildly different" subplots. She admired the attempt to "shin[e] a light on a population that's often invisible in the media landscape" by introducing a transgender character, but thought that Tony's character was underdeveloped and "more like a prop than a character". Similarly, Adam W. Kepler of The New York Times felt that Tony was a cliché of trans men—"absolutely nothing [viewers] haven't seen before"—whose characterisation was overly simplistic.

Although Chris Jancelewicz of The Huffington Post found Tony's character dull, he wrote in response to Maslany's portrayal of him: "Gift-wrap that Golden Globe, Hollywood Foreign Press. There are no other Best TV Actress contenders this year." He praised the "touching" scenes shared by Cosima with Delphine and Scott and the "entertaining and twisted" bonding between Alison and Donnie. IGN's Eric Goldman felt that introducing Tony was a "big leap" for the show but that it paid off, largely due to Maslany's performance, and enjoyed the storylines featuring Alison, Cosima and Rachel. Vlada Gelman wrote for TVLine that Maslany's performance as Tony in "Variable and Full of Perturbation" was proof that "there [isn't] anything Tatiana Maslany can't do". Conversely, Rob Hunter of Film School Rejects felt that her portrayal of Tony provided "proof that Maslany is human after all and capable of failure".
