= Lauren Shippen =

Fiction writer, director, and actor

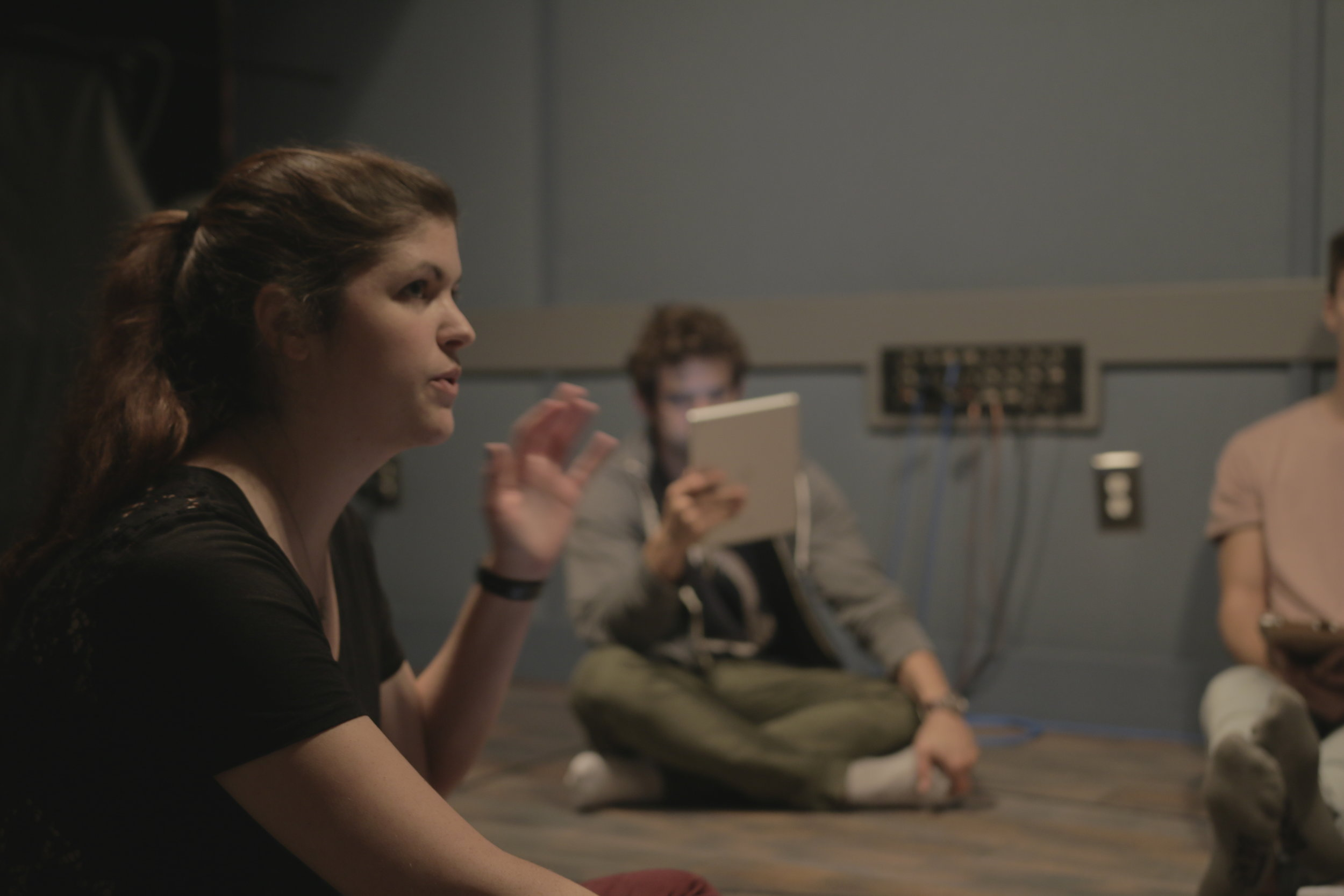
- Shippen in 2017
- Education: College of William & Mary
- Occupations: Writer; Director; Actor
- Writing career
- Language: English
- Genres: Science fiction; Superhero; Thriller
- Notable works: The Bright Sessions; Passenger List
- Website: laurenshippen.com

Lauren Shippen is a fiction writer, director, and actor. She created the podcast The Bright Sessions and its spin-off series, The AM Archives and The College Tapes. Shippen won an Audio Verse award for her portrayal of Sam in The Bright Sessions (the character also appeared in The AM Archives). She has also written three novels set in The Bright Sessions universe. Shippen was named in the 2018 Forbes 30 Under 30. She was also named one of MovieMaker Magazine and the Austin Film Festival's 25 Screenwriters to Watch in 2018.

== Early life and education ==
Shippen was born in New York City. She is the daughter of President and COO of Edelman PR, Matthew Harrington. She studied at the College of William & Mary where she majored in music.

== Career ==
After college, Shippen moved to Los Angeles to work as an actor, mixing auditions with working at a restaurant. Around this time she began developing ideas for a podcast, drawing on her experience of music and sound editing and partly inspired by Welcome to Nightvale. Her initial idea was to center the story on a girl who time travels, who would be played by Shippen, and to have her talk to a therapist to set up a dialogue between characters rather than having a single character monologuing. This became The Bright Sessions which ran for four seasons released between 2015 and 2018, with Shippen writing the show and voicing one of the main characters, Sam Barnes.

The Bright Sessions follows people with special abilities, "atypicals", and their interactions with a therapist, Dr. Bright. Around the therapy sessions covered by each episode, a larger meta-story emerges. It has been recognised for its representation of LGBTQ+ people. Shippen won several Audio Verse Awards for the show: the 2016 Award for Best Writing of an Original, Short Form, Ongoing Production, the 2016 Award for Best Performance of an Actress in an Original Ensemble Role for a Short Form Production for her role as Sam. and the 2017 Award for Best Writing for an Ongoing, Dramatic Production. She also acts as one of the leads in the web series Natural 20 from The Escapist.

By 2018, The Bright Sessions had reached 8 million downloads. Shippen wrote a series of books about characters from the show, with the first book (The Infinite Noise) published in 2019. In 2019, she co-founded a production company, Atypical Artists, with Jordan Cope and Briggon Snow. The company was set-up to publish new podcasts, especially in the universe of The Bright Sessions. Amongst the new podcasts were The AM Archives and The College Tapes, both part of the 'Bright Universe' and created and written by Shippen.

The Bright Sessions led to opportunities to work on other shows, and John Scott Dryden contacted Shippen about working on a new fiction podcast, Passenger List. She joined the project as a co-writer and co-director along with Dryden and Mark Henry Phillips. The show, part of the Radiotopia podcast network, explores the disappearance of a trans-Atlantic flight. Passenger List was released in 2019 and its first season won the 2020 BBC Audio Drama Award for Best Podcast or Online Audio Drama, the People's Voice award in the Scripted Podcast category at the 2020 Webby Awards, and Gold in the Best Fiction category at the 2020 British Podcast Awards. The second season won the 2022 BBC Audio Drama Award in the same category.

In 2019, Marvel and Stitcher Premium commissioned a podcast adaptation of the graphic novel MARVELS. Shippen wrote the adaption, which was directed by Paul Bae, and with sound design by Mischa Stanton.

In 2020, Lauren served as Executive Producer and voiced the role of "Gerda" in the iHeart Radio Podcast Award-nominated musical series, In Strange Woods.

In 2021, she collaborated with Aaron Mahnke to co-write Bridgewater, a fiction podcast about folklore and the Bridgewater Triangle. It won the iHeartRadio Podcast Award for Best Fiction Podcast. Shippen also wrote and directed Rebel Robin, a prequel podcast for the Netflix series Stranger Things with the character Robin Buckley (played by Maya Hawke) as the protagonist. In 2022, Atypical Artists released Maxine Miles, a podcast created and written by Shippen. It is an interactive mystery written for a young adult audience.

In July 2023, Shippen began releasing Breaker Whiskey, a fiction podcast following a woman after an apocalyptic event in the 1960s.

Also in 2024, Shippen launched New Year's Day, an annual fiction podcast released each January 1st. The series follows two immortal men, Charles Chambers and John Fogg, who meet every thirteen years to discuss their lives and the challenges of living forever. It is written and directed by Shippen and stars Andrew Nowak and Briggon Snow.

In September 2025, Shippen created, wrote, directed, and starred in Two Thousand and Late, a dark comedy fiction podcast produced by Atypical Artists. The series follows Harper, a thirty-six-year-old nihilist who is possessed by a demon intent on bringing about the apocalypse; Shippen voices both the protagonist and the demon.

== Publications ==
=== Bright Sessions novels ===
- The Infinite Noise (2019)
- A Neon Darkness (2020)
- Some Faraway Place (2021)

== Awards and nominations ==
Year	Award	Category	Work	Result
2016	Audio Verse Awards	Best Writing of an Original, Short Form, Ongoing Production	The Bright Sessions	Won
2016	Audio Verse Awards	Best Performance of an Actress in an Original Ensemble Role for a Short Form Production	The Bright Sessions	Won
2017	Audio Verse Awards	Best Writing for an Ongoing Dramatic Production	The Bright Sessions	Won
2020	Webby Awards	People's Voice – Scripted Podcast	Passenger List	Won
2020	British Podcast Awards	Best Fiction	Passenger List	Won
