= Rusty Ross =

- Occupation: Actor
- Years active: 2005–present
- Website: www.rustyross.com

Rusty Ross is an actor currently residing in New York City. In 2006, he appeared in the original cast of Dr. Seuss' How the Grinch Stole Christmas! on Broadway, and reprised his role when the production returned in 2007. As the role of Professor, he recently completed the national tour of the Lincoln Center Theater production of South Pacific, which began performances in San Francisco in September 2009 and closed in Toronto in March 2011.

== Interviews ==
- Broadway.com, November 9, 2006
- BroadwayWorld.com, November 10, 2006
- WNYC: The Leonard Lopate Show, WNYC, December 15, 2006
- Westport Country Playhouse: Behind the Curtain, April 23, 2015
