= Julia Morizawa =

American actress

- Occupation: Actor
- Years active: 2003–present

Julia Morizawa is an American actress, writer and producer. She has performed in over 100 film, television, theatre, and internet productions throughout her career. She is best known for playing Maya Stadi in the webseries Star Trek: Odyssey, S'Tal in Star Trek: Hidden Frontier, the voice of Dr. Bright in the podcast The Bright Sessions, and the voice of Amelia in The Amelia Project. Her most notable credit as a writer is the book Memoirs of a Wannabe Sex Addict, a compilation of short erotic stories published by Fanny Press.

== Career highlights ==
Julia is probably best known for her recurring roles in the webseries Star Trek: Odyssey and Star Trek: Hidden Frontier, and the lead role of Dr. Bright in the fictional narrative podcast The Bright Sessions (ranked one of the best podcasts of 2016 by iTunes, Wired, IndieWire, and Popular Science; winner of Best Actress in a Leading Role, 2016 AudioVerse Awards and Best Actress in a Leading role for an Ongoing, Dramatic Production 2017 AudioVerse Awards). Her resume also includes the feature films Judas Kiss (rated as one of the must-see LGBT films of 2011) and Tied Up (for which she was awarded Best Supporting Actress at the Denver Underground Film Festival); the title role in East West Players' production of Masha No Home; TV's Lewis Black's The Root of All Evil; and the webseries Frontier Guard. From its beginning, she has provided the introduction to The Amelia Project podcast, joining the main cast in Season 3 as Amelia, he titular leader of the namesake clandestine death-faking project.

== Early life ==
Julia spent the early years of her life as a competitive gymnast living in Oregon. After "falling out of love" with the sport, She decided to try theater in her high school after confiding with a close childhood friend. The very first play Julia was ever in was a production of I Remember Mama at Albany Civic Theater, a community theater in a neighboring town. Morizawa moved to Los Angeles, California on her 18th birthday to pursue a professional acting career.

== Original projects ==
Julia has also written, produced and starred in her own original projects JesusCat (or How I Accidentally Joined a Cult) (feature film), Twenty-Two (stage play), and Sin & Lyle (short film). JesusCat (or How I Accidentally Joined a Cult) is a feature-length improvisational mockumentary about a vlogger, a cat, a cult, and the second-coming of Jesus Christ. It was awarded Best Comedy Feature at the Asians On Film Festival in 2014 and the Movie Heroes Rising Star Award at the Action On Film Festival in 2013. Twenty-Two, a stage play about cocaine addiction, premiered at the Knightsbridge Theatre in 2010. LA Theatre Review stated, "Well, if art is supposed to imitate life, Twenty Two has accomplished its mission. The characters are totally believable, the dialogue is as natural as it gets and the acting overall is amazingly realistic." Sin & Lyle, a short film tackling the subject of suicide and depression, earned Julia a Best Female Filmmaker nomination at the Action on Film International Film Festival in Long Beach in 2007.

In addition, Julia's first book Memoirs of a Wannabe Sex Addict, a collection of short erotic stories, has earned rave reviews. Erotica Revealed stated, "Morizawa is a first-rate writer. The quality of the writing blends literate prose with an accessible style that few authors can manage." And Sacramento Book Review stated, "Morizawa's debut collection of erotica is an impressive read with an array of identifiable characters connecting to the darker side of the feminine."

Julia's most recent project, Dragonfly, is currently in post production after successfully reaching the intended crowdfunding necessary. Inspired by the true event of the Tokyo Firebombing and Julia's mother's parents, she goes back into her roots to tell the story about her mother and how her grandmother lived through the bombing, the ghost of her mother's brother, Julia's uncle, being the harbinger of the news. She cites in her campaign video, "Not only is this story deeply personal to me because of its inclusion in my own ancestry, but it's a tragic part of history that i didn't even know about until I started researching my own heritage. My goal as a filmmaker is to tell personal stories that explore humanity's past while also inspiring a future. I believe that 'Dragonfly' is an important story to tell, before it's completely forgotten. I also believe this film can offer a platform for some marginalized creators while helping to maintain the history of many Japanese and Japanese-Americans."

== Films ==
- Dragonfly (short film, animated, post-production)
- The Amelia Project (podcast, 2019–present)
- Kakos Industries (Podcast, 2018, guest role)
- How We Roll (feature film, 2017)
- Galactic Galaxy (web series, 2017)
- Blade of Honor (TV series, 2017)
- Within the Wires (Podcast, 2017, guest role)
- The Bright Sessions (Podcast, 2016)
- Five Ways to Say Goodbye (short film, 2016)
- Scream at the Devil (feature film, 2015)
- Revenge of the Flower Gang (short film, 2015)
- Mira (short film, 2015)
- Just Us Guys (web series, 2014–2015)
- Without Annette (play, 2014)
- JesusCat (or How I Accidentally Joined a Cult) (feature film, 2013)
- Dr. Who, What and Where (play, 2013)
- A Midsummer Night's Dream (play, 2012)
- Judas Kiss (feature film, 2011)
- Try Again (short film, 2011)
- Star Trek: Odyssey (web series, 2007–2011)
- Paradise (short film, 2010)
- Frontier Guard (web series, 2010–2011)
- Macbeezy: the Macbeth Hip-Hopera (play, 2010)
- Romeo & Juliet: a Disco Drag Farce (play, 2010)
- Twenty-Two (play, 2010)
- Lewis Black's the Root of All Evil (TV, 2008)
- Blood & Sex Nightmare (feature film, 2008)
- Star Trek: Operation Beta Shield (feature film, 2008)
- Star Trek: Hidden Frontier (web series, 2003–2007)
- Much Ado About Nothing (play, 2007)
- Diary of a Catholic School Dropout (play, 2007)
- The Silver Dragon (short film, 2006)
- Sin & Lyle (short film, 2006)
- Late Night (feature film, 2005)
- Tied Up (feature film, 2004)
- Masha No Home (play, 2003)
- Buffy the Vampire Slayer (TV, 2003)
- ER (TV, 2003)
