= Patrick Page =

American actor and singer (born 1962)

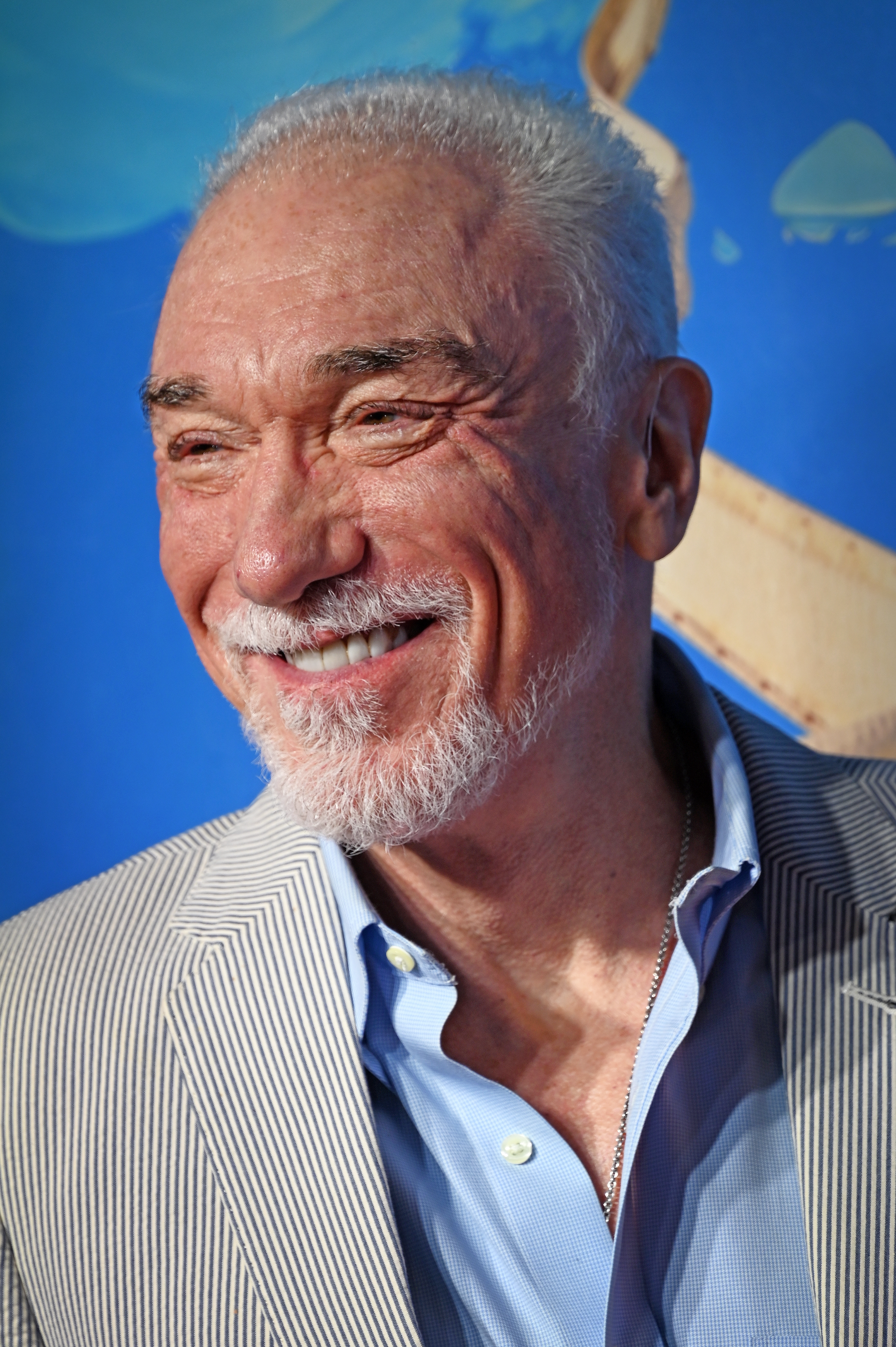
- Page in 2026
- Born: John Patrick Page; April 27, 1962 (age 64); Spokane, Washington, U.S.
- Education: Allan Hancock College; Whitman College (BA)
- Occupations: Actor; singer; playwright
- Years active: 1986–present
- Spouse: Paige Davis (m. 2001)
- Website: patrickpageonline.com

John Patrick Page (born April 27, 1962) is an American actor, low bass singer, and playwright. Beginning his career in classical theatre and the works of Shakespeare, he originated the Broadway roles of the Grinch in Dr. Seuss' How the Grinch Stole Christmas! The Musical (2006–2007), Norman Osborn/Green Goblin in Spider-Man: Turn Off the Dark (2011–2012), and Hades in Hadestown (2019–2022), the last of which earned him a Grammy Award for Best Musical Theater Album and a nomination for the Tony Award for Best Featured Actor in a Musical.

== Early life and education ==
John Patrick Page was born in Spokane, Washington, and raised primarily in Monmouth, Oregon. His father, Robert Page, was a theatre educator at Western Oregon University (then named Oregon College of Education). Page's early love of Shakespeare took hold when his father performed with the Oregon Shakespeare Festival in Ashland, Oregon, in 1964–1965. His mother, Geri, was an administrator at Oregon State University.

In his teens, he developed an interest in magic and illusion. In 1978 he won the Pacific Coast Association of Magicians Stage Competition and in 1979 he was chosen by the International Brotherhood of Magicians as the Outstanding Teenage Magician in the stage-magic category.

Page attended Central High School in Independence, Oregon, graduating in 1980. During high school, Page was active not only in theater, but also in speech and debate tournaments and became the first person to win the national championship title twice, as the National Forensics League's Speaker of the Year in both 1979 and 1980. Next, he attended the Pacific Conservatory of the Performing Arts at Allan Hancock College. He then graduated cum laude from Whitman College in 1985 and was chosen as the valedictory speaker for his class. During his time at Whitman, Page was twice chosen as the Outstanding Competitive Speaker in the Nation by the American Forensics Association, leading the Whitman team to an overall second-place finish at Nationals.

== Career ==
=== 1993–2010: Early roles and Broadway debut ===
Page's early career was spent primarily in Utah and Oregon. Page spent six seasons with the Utah Shakespeare Festival in Cedar City, becoming a Resident Artist and the Director of Development, during which time he helped oversee the creation of the new Randall L. Jones Theatre. During the off-season he frequently performed with the Pioneer Theatre Company in Salt Lake City. Subsequently, he spent several seasons with the Oregon Shakespeare Festival in Ashland, before branching out to other regional theatres and eventually moving to New York.

Page's Broadway credits include originating the role of The Grinch in Dr. Seuss' How the Grinch Stole Christmas!, Scar in The Lion King and Lumière in Disney's Beauty and the Beast in the U.S. National Tours, both of which he later reprised on Broadway, Ebenezer Scrooge and Jacob Marley in A Christmas Carol at Madison Square Garden, Decius Brutus in Julius Caesar (opposite Denzel Washington), and multiple roles in The Kentucky Cycle. His performance as King Henry VIII (opposite Frank Langella) in the Broadway revival of A Man for All Seasons in 2008 was nominated for the Outer Critics Award and chosen by The Wall Street Journal as one of the outstanding theatre performances of that year.

Off-Broadway, he has been seen in Richard II, Rex, and The Duchess of Malfi. Page is also widely recognized as one of America's leading classical actors. He is an Affiliate Artist of the Shakespeare Theatre Company in Washington, D.C., and an Artist in Residence at the Old Globe Theatre in San Diego. As a member of the Shakespeare Theatre Company, he, along with other company members, received the William Shakespeare Award for Classical Theatre (Will Award) in 2007. In 2006 Page was awarded the Helen Hayes Award for Outstanding Leading Performance by an Actor for his portrayal of Iago (opposite Avery Brooks) in Michael Kahn's production of Othello at The Shakespeare Theatre. Washington Post critic Peter Marks cited Page's Iago as one of five outstanding American performances of Shakespeare in his lifetime, along with Stacy Keach, Liev Schreiber, Kevin Kline, and Michael Hayden. Page's other performances at STC include the title role in Macbeth (opposite Kelly McGillis) and Claudius in Hamlet. He starred in the title role of King Lear at the Shakespeare Theatre Company through April 8, 2023.

At the Old Globe Theatre in San Diego, Page's performance in the title role of Cyrano De Bergerac won the Craig Noel, San Diego Critics, and Patte Awards for Outstanding Leading Actor in a Play. He has also been seen at the Globe as Malvolio in Twelfth Night, Pogo Poole in The Pleasure of His Company, and Geoffrey Cordova in Dancing in the Dark (aka The Band Wagon) for which he also received the Craig Noel Award. Page has performed at many of America's leading regional theatres. His classical performances include Cyrano, Sergius, Hamlet, Richard II, Richard III, Oberon, Henry V, Talbot, Pinch, Armado, Mercutio, Brutus, Antony, Dr. Caius, Autolycus, Pandarus, Brazen, Hortensio, Malvolio, Horatio, Claudius, Iago, Jaques, Macbeth, and Benedick. Page is also a playwright. In 2004 his play Swansong debuted at the Lucille Lortel White Barn Theatre in Norwalk, Connecticut, and was named one of the top ten plays of the year by the American Theatre Critics Association. It later played at the Kennedy Center, the Seattle Shakespeare Company, and off-Broadway on Theatre Row.

Page is also the author of the one-man shows Passion's Slaves, All the Devils are Here, and Love Will, and the co-author (with Doug Christensen and Larry Baker) of Nothing Like the Sun. Page authored a popular stage adaptation of A Christmas Carol. Page is also an acting teacher who has worked at NYU's Tisch Graduate School of the Arts, the Old Globe's MFA program, the Alabama Shakespeare Festival's MFA program, Southern Utah University, and many others. He now teaches privately in New York City. He has directed Macbeth, Romeo and Juliet, A Midsummer Night's Dream, Measure for Measure, Twelfth Night, and many more.

=== 2011–2017: Theatre roles ===
Page created the dual role of Norman Osborn and his alter ego the Green Goblin in Julie Taymor's Broadway rock musical Spider-Man: Turn Off the Dark, which played at the Foxwoods Theatre until January 2014. Premiering in June 2011, it featured music and lyrics by Bono and The Edge. Page's performance received positive reviews and was quoted as being one of the main reasons to see the show. For this performance, he received a nomination for the Drama Desk Award for Outstanding Featured Actor in a Musical. Page left the show on August 5, 2012, to star in the new Broadway production of Cyrano De Bergerac which ran for a limited engagement from September to November 2012. His role in Spider-Man was taken over by Robert Cuccioli.

Page played the title role in Shakespeare Theatre Company's Coriolanus from March to June 2013. Page appeared in the Broadway production of John Grisham's A Time to Kill. The production started on September 28, 2013, and officially opened on October 20, 2013. He appeared in the new play Casa Valentina, which opened on Broadway in April 2014. He originated the role of Frollo in the U.S. premiere of The Hunchback of Notre Dame, made his Shakespeare in the Park debut in Cymbeline, and in fall 2015 played Adult Men in the Spring Awakening revival produced by Deaf West and directed by his Hunchback co-star Michael Arden.

=== 2018–present: Hadestown and screen roles ===
Page played Hades in productions of Hadestown at the New York Theatre Workshop, at the Citadel Theatre in Edmonton, and at London's Royal National Theatre. He reprised the role of Hades on Broadway at the Walter Kerr Theatre beginning in March 2019, receiving a nomination for the Tony Award for Best Featured Actor in a Musical. The role features Page singing as low as a G1, which is one of the lowest notes playable on a piano. On November 2, 2022, it was announced that Page would be exiting Hadestown on December 30, after six years in the role. Page was set to reprise the role in February and March 2025 for his West End debut opposite his original Broadway costars. The day before Page was set to begin performances, he announced that Phillip Boykin would be filling in for him while he recovered from an injury. Page did participate in a filmed version of the West End production featuring the original Broadway cast, which was recorded from February 28 to March 1, 2025.

Page played a role in the 2022 musical film Spirited as Jacob Marley alongside Ryan Reynolds and Will Ferrell.

In 2024, Page began a national tour of All the Devils are Here, a one-man show exploring Shakespeare's villains. The play opened at the Guthrie Theatre in Minneapolis.

Page played Satan in the Helluva Boss episode "Mastermind." In 2025, he had a voice role as the Magic Mirror in Disney's Snow White. He is currently playing Richard Clay on HBO's The Gilded Age.

== Personal life ==
He was married to actress Liisa Ivary from 1989 to 1991. In 2001, he married actress and TV personality Paige Davis (TLC's Trading Spaces, Broadway's Chicago and Boeing-Boeing). The couple said in 2009: "We've been a couple for 14 years and married for eight of them..."

He has been an outspoken advocate for mental-health awareness and has spoken publicly about his lifelong experience with deep depression, which he now manages with medication: "It took a long time to get my medications right. I have variously been diagnosed with an anxiety disorder, bipolar disorder, depressive disorder—you name it. It takes constant vigilance to keep up with my sneaky serotonin levels. And—full disclosure—there were years of dangerous substance abuse as I attempted to self-medicate my symptoms." Page also has hearing loss and has been an advocate for adding closed captioning to live musicals, as well as increasing the recording volumes of soundtracks.

== Acting credits ==
=== Film ===
| Year | Title | Role | Notes |
|---|---|---|---|
| 1996 | The Substance of Fire | Mr. McCormack Jr. | |
| 2013 | Sing Along | Homeless Guy | Short film |
| 2014 | Affluenza | Jack Goodman | |
| 2015 | I Am Michael | Bible Teacher | |
| 2015 | A Warrior's Tail | Elza (voice) | English dub |
| 2021 | In the Heights | Pike Phillips | |
| 2021 | The Sixth Reel | Mr. Beltrane | |
| 2022 | Spirited | Jacob Marley | |
| 2025 | Snow White | Magic Mirror (voice) | |
| 2026 | Hadestown: The Musical | Hades | Professionally filmed stage musical |

=== Television ===
| Year | Title | Role | Notes |
|---|---|---|---|
| 1989 | The Animated Book of Mormon | King Lamoni (voice) | Episode: "Ammon, Missionary to the Lamanites" |
| 1991 | Animated Hero Classics | Bosco (voice) | Episode: "Christopher Columbus" |
| 2007–2020 | Law & Order: Special Victims Unit | Jack Rexton Alistair Woodford | Episode: "Harm" Episode: "Dance, Lies and Videotape" |
| 2011 | Late Night with David Letterman | Green Goblin (uncredited) | Episode: "Bono & The Edge/Spider-Man: Turn Off the Dark" |
| 2012 | The Good Wife | Horton Baker | Episode: "After the Fall" |
| 2015 | Flesh and Bone | Sergei Zelenkov | Miniseries; 6 episodes |
| 2015 | Elementary | Jonathan Bloom | 2 episodes |
| 2016 | The Blacklist | Rene Le Bron | Episode: "The Thrushes (No. 53)" |
| 2017 | Chicago P.D. | Calvin Huntley | Episode: "Little Bit of Light" |
| 2017 | Madam Secretary | Reverend Slattery | 3 episodes |
| 2018 | NCIS: New Orleans | General Stanley Parker | Episode: "Welcome to the Jungle" |
| 2020–2022 | Evil | Father Luke | 2 episodes |
| 2022–present | The Gilded Age | Richard Clay | 21 episodes |
| 2023 | Schmigadoon! | Octavius Kratt | 5 episodes |
| 2023 | Big Mouth | Dread (voice) | 2 episodes |
| 2024 | Helluva Boss | Satan (voice) | Episode: "Mastermind" |
| 2025 | Étoile | Uncle John Fish | 3 episodes |
| TBA | Sub/liminal | | Upcoming series |

=== Theatre ===
| Year | Title | Role | Notes |
|---|---|---|---|
| 1986 | Love's Labor's Lost | Don Adriano de Armado | Utah Shakespeare Festival |
| 1986 | Julius Caesar | Marcus Brutus | Utah Shakespeare Festival |
| 1987 | The Tragedy of King Richard the Third | Richard, Duke of Gloucester | Utah Shakespeare Festival |
| 1987 | Much Ado About Nothing | Leonato | Utah Shakespeare Festival |
| 1990 | The Comedy of Errors | Duke Solinus | Pioneer Theatre Company |
| 1993 | The Kentucky Cycle | Various | Kennedy Center |
| 1993–1994 | The Kentucky Cycle | Various | Original Broadway cast |
| 1995–1997 | Beauty and the Beast | Lumière | National Tour |
| 1999–2001 | Beauty and the Beast | Lumière | Broadway replacement |
| 2002 | The Lion King | Scar | National Tour |
| 2003 | Beauty and the Beast | Lumière | Broadway replacement |
| 2004 | Macbeth | Macbeth | Shakespeare Theatre Company |
| 2005 | Julius Caesar | Decius Brutus; Messala; Ensemble; Understudy for Cassius | Original Broadway cast |
| 2005 | Othello | Iago | Shakespeare Theatre Company |
| 2005–2006 | The Lion King | Scar | Broadway Replacement |
| 2006 | Dr. Seuss' How the Grinch Stole Christmas! The Musical | The Grinch | Original Broadway cast |
| 2007 | The Lion King | Scar | Broadway Replacement |
| 2007 | Dr. Seuss' How the Grinch Stole Christmas! The Musical | The Grinch | Original Broadway cast |
| 2008 | Hamlet | Claudius | Shakespeare Theatre Company |
| 2008 | A Man for All Seasons | King Henry VIII | Original Broadway cast |
| 2010 | Oliver! | Fagin | Benedum Center for the Performing Arts |
| 2011–2012 | Spider-Man: Turn Off the Dark | Norman Osborn; The Green Goblin | Original Broadway cast |
| 2012 | Anastasia | Vlad Popov | Reading |
| 2012 | The Sound of Music | Max Detweiler | Carnegie Hall |
| 2012 | Cyrano de Bergerac | Comte de Guiche | Original Broadway cast |
| 2013 | A Time to Kill | Rufus R. Buckley | Original Broadway cast |
| 2014 | Casa Valentina | George; Valentina | Original Broadway cast |
| 2014–2015 | The Hunchback of Notre Dame | Dom Claude Frollo | La Jolla Playhouse; Paper Mill Playhouse |
| 2015–2016 | Spring Awakening | Adult Men | Original Broadway Revival Cast |
| 2016 | Hadestown | Hades | Off-Broadway |
| 2016 | An Act of God | Voice of God | Prerecorded for Broadway |
| 2016 | The Tempest | Prospero | Sidney Harman Hall |
| 2017 | Hadestown | Hades | Edmonton's Citadel Theatre |
| 2017 | A Musical Christmas Carol | Ebenezer Scrooge | The Byham Theater |
| 2018 | Saint Joan | The Inquisitor; Robert de Baudricourt | Original Broadway cast |
| 2018–2019 | Hadestown | Hades | London |
| 2019–2020 | Hadestown | Hades | Original Broadway cast |
| 2021–2022 | Hadestown | Hades | Original Broadway cast |
| 2023 | King Lear | Lear | Shakespeare Theatre Company |
| 2023–2024 | All the Devils Are Here | Performer | Off-Broadway; Also created the show |
| 2025 | Hadestown | Hades | West End replacement |
| 2025 | Archduke | Captain Dimitrijevic | Roundabout Theatre Company |
| 2026 | Titus Andronicus | Titus Andronicus | Off-Broadway |
| 2026 | Man of La Mancha | Captain of the Inquisition / The Innkeeper | Broadway Concert |

=== Audio ===
| Year | Title | Voice role | Ref. |
|---|---|---|---|
| 2020 | Little Did I Know | Dr. Barrows | |
| 2020–21 | In Strange Woods | Howl | |
| 2021 | Marvel's Wastelanders: Star-Lord | Kraven the Hunter | |

== Awards and nominations ==
Page has received a variety of awards and accolades throughout his career, including a Grammy Award, a Helen Hayes Award, a Princess Grace Award, an Emery Battis Award, the Utah Governors Medal for the Arts, the Whitman College Young Alumni Award, the Craig Noel Award, and the Joseph Jefferson Award, as well as having received a Tony Award nomination.

| Year | Award | Category | Work | Result | Ref. |
|---|---|---|---|---|---|
| 2009 | Outer Critics Circle Award | Outstanding Featured Actor in a Play | A Man for All Seasons | Nominated | |
| 2012 | Drama Desk Award | Outstanding Featured Actor in a Musical | Spider-Man: Turn Off the Dark | Nominated | |
| 2012 | Outer Critics Circle Award | Outstanding Featured Actor in a Musical | Spider-Man: Turn Off the Dark | Nominated | |
| 2014 | San Diego Theatre Critics Circle Award | Outstanding Featured Male Performance in a Musical | The Hunchback of Notre Dame | Won | |
| 2017 | Lucille Lortel Award | Outstanding Actor in a Musical | Hadestown | Nominated | |
| 2019 | Tony Award | Best Featured Actor in a Musical | Hadestown | Nominated | |
| 2020 | Grammy Award | Best Musical Theater Album | Hadestown | Won | |
| 2023 | Actor Awards | Outstanding Performance by an Ensemble in a Drama Series | The Gilded Age | Nominated | |
| 2024 | Drama Desk Award | Outstanding Solo Performance | All the Devils Are Here | Won | |
| 2024 | Outer Critics Circle Award | Outstanding Solo Performance | All the Devils Are Here | Won | |
| 2026 | Drama Desk Awards | Outstanding Lead Performance in a Play | Titus Andronicus | Nominated | |
