= The Bright Sessions =

Science fiction podcast

- Title card of the podcast
- Genre: Science fiction
- Language: English

Creative team
- Created by: Lauren Shippen
- Written by: Lauren Shippen

Cast and voices
- Starring: Julia Morizawa

Music
- Composed by: Evan Cunningham

Publication
- No. of seasons: 4
- No. of episodes: 56
- Original release: November 1, 2015 – June 13, 2018
- Updates: Complete

Related
- Website: www.thebrightsessions.com

The Bright Sessions is a science fiction podcast audio drama created by Lauren Shippen and starring Julia Morizawa as the titular Dr. Bright. The podcast takes place in a fictional universe where super-powered individuals, called "atypicals", exist. Dr. Bright is a therapist and the podcast originally focuses on her sessions with various patients.

== Plot ==
=== Season 1 ===
The first season focuses on Dr. Bright's therapy sessions with three patients. Sam Barnes who can travel in the past, Chloe Turner who is a telepath and Caleb Michaels, an empath. Sam is a new patient who has panic attacks that cause her to jump back in time and Dr. Bright attempts to help her with her anxiety, so that she can have more control over her ability. Caleb is a high school boy who begins to run into problems when he discovers a classmate can overwhelm his powers. Chloe is also a new patient, sent to Dr. Bright by her mother, and she initially believes she can hear the voices of angels.

=== Season 2 ===
In the first episode of the second season, Damien is introduced. He is a mind manipulator who has been using his ability to force Dr. Bright to give him therapy. Agent Green is also introduced in this season. Caleb tells Adam about his ability and they begin dating. Sam and Dr. Bright start developing a plan to break Dr. Bright's brother, Mark, out of the AM. Chloe meets Sam and Caleb. The season ends with Sam and Dr. Bright, with the addition of Damien, successfully taking Mark out of the AM. However, Damien's curiosity about Mark's ability leads him to kidnap Mark for his own means.

=== Season 3 ===
Damian has taken Mark and hides Dr. Bright's involvement in his escape. Sam and Dr. Bright attempt to find Damian and Mark, but prove unsuccessful. In episode 4, Frank is introduced, a man who had telepathic abilities artificially added to him. The group finds out the Adam is the nephew of Wadsworth, the director of the local branch of the AM Archives. Mark manages to regain control of his powers, the ability to borrow other atypicals powers, and forces Damian to return him to Dr. Bright. Damian is left without his power and contacts Wadsworth to become inoculated against the powers of others. Dr. Bright, Sam, Chloe, Caleb, Adam, and Mark go to a safe house to escape Damian. Damian attacks Chloe, which leads to a fight between Damian and Caleb.

=== Season 4 ===
The majority of season 4 follows the characters dealing with the fallout of the finale of season 3. Chloe, dealing with the negative effects of Damian's attack, leaves to spend time in the country to recover. Caleb and Adam go to college. Mark and Sam are living together and dealing with their combined trauma. Sam and Dr. Bright begin working together in atypical investigation, as well as becoming co-directors of the AM Archives with Agent Green after Wadsworth gets promoted to Washington. Damian, who no longer has powers, has to adjust to a new way of life.

=== Season 5 ===
Season 5 is a series of bonus episodes consisting of appointments with Dr. Bright's other patients, including Chloe's mother, a shapeshifter, and a man who can become invisible among others.

=== Season 6 ===
Season 6 was originally a separate podcast called the AM Archives. It follows Dr. Bright, Agent Green, and Sam as they work to reform their branch of The AM as directors. Following on from the end of series 4, the directors move forward with a plan to empty our tier 5. During Dr. Bright's evaluation, a patient named Helen, a frequency manipulator, escapes and forces Agent Green to call Wadsworth. After this, she kills Agent Green and attempts to kill Wadsworth after her arrival. At the same time, Mark agreed to test a serum to temporarily block an atypicals power. The serum works and is able to be used to help another patient named Alex, a fire manipulator who had been in a coma for his own protection.

=== Season 7 ===
Season 7 was originally a separate podcast called the College Tapes. Caleb and Adam begin investigating time disturbances at Yale. One of Caleb's friends is also kidnapped by a secret organization. At the same time, Oliver Ritz, an alchemist and friend of Mark's from tier 5, is hired to take apart an atypical artifact at Yale. The time disturbances are traced back to the artifact. Caleb, Adam, Mark, and Oliver team up to defeat the organization that kidnapped Caleb's friend that wants to use the artifact to create someone with combined powers.

== Cast and characters ==
- Julia Morizawa as Dr. Joan Bright:
  The titular character of the podcast, Dr. Bright is a psychologist who specializes in therapy for atypicals, individuals with powers. It's later revealed that she used to work for a nonprofit organization called the AM and is trying to free her brother from the organization's facility.
- Lauren Shippen as Samantha "Sam" Barnes:
  Sam is a new patient of Dr. Bright who has anxiety and can travel through time.
- Briggon Snow as Caleb Michaels:
  A high school student with empathetic abilities who struggles with controlling his own emotions due to his power.
- Anna Lore as Chloe Turner:
  An atypical with the ability to read minds. Initially believing the voices she hears to be angels, she started seeing Dr. Bright at the behest of her mother.
- Charlie Ian as Damien:
  A man with the power to manipulate the wants of others. He uses this ability to force Dr. Bright into giving him therapy.
- Ian McQuown as Agent Green:
  Dr. Bright's ex who works for the mysterious AM.
- Alex Gallner as Adam Hayes:
  One of Caleb's classmates who helps him control his power.
- Andrew Nowak as Mark Bryant:
  Dr Bright's younger brother who was kidnapped and experimented on by the AM. He can mimic the abilities of other nearby atypicals.
- Alex Marshall-Brown as Wadsworth:
  One of the directors of the AM.
- Phillip Jordan as Frank Sawyer:
  A homeless military veteran who Chloe befriends. He was part of a military experiment with the AM to give ordinary people atypical abilities.
- Alanna Fox as Rose Atkinson:
  A new patient of Dr. Bright's with narcolepsy who can enter into and manipulate other people's dreams. She comes from a family of atypicals.

== Production ==
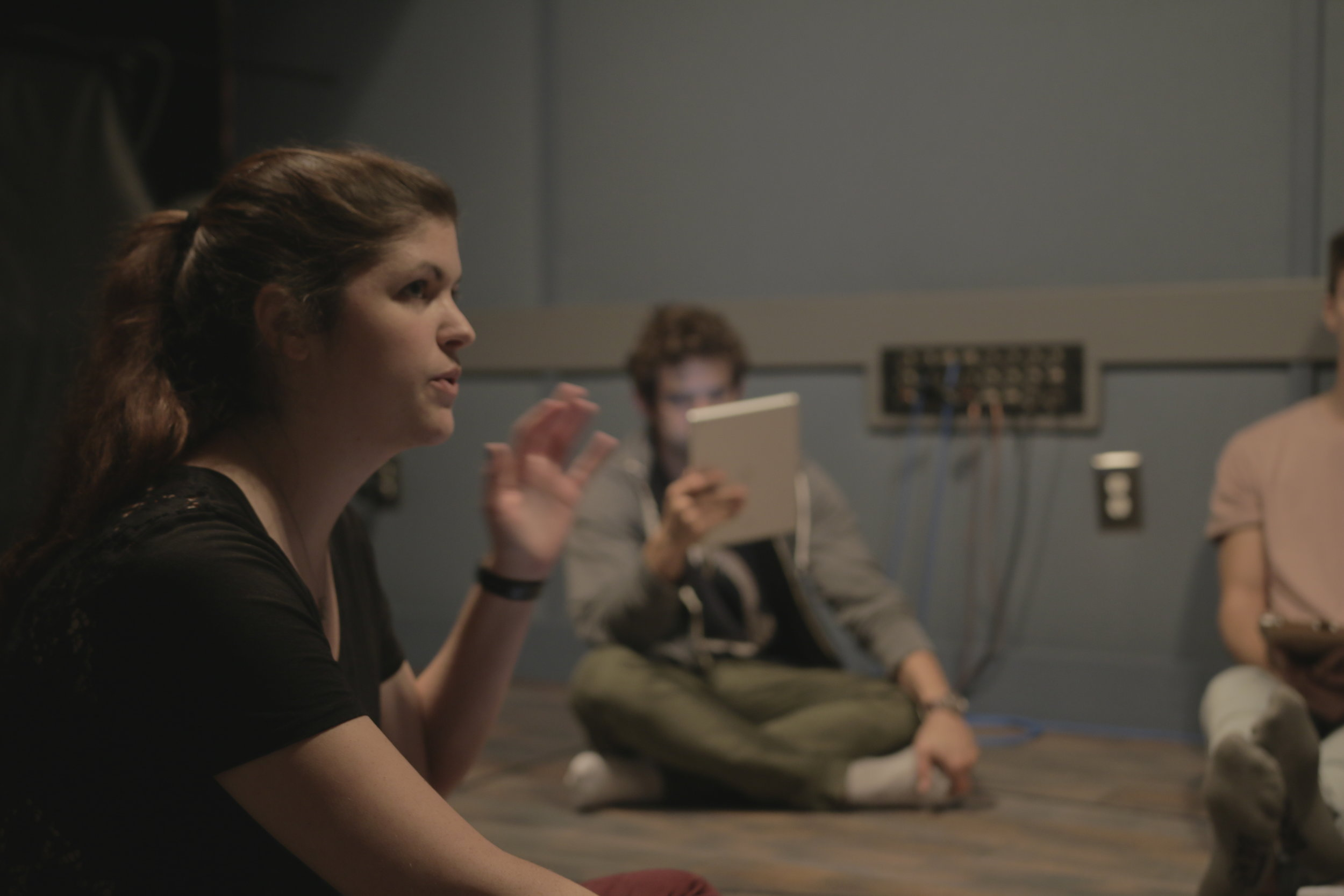
Lauren Shippen in 2017

In an interview, Shippen revealed that the first character to be created for the podcast was Sam. She thought about creating a character who had the ability to travel "into famous novels", but decided to turn the character into a time-traveller, as it was easier to write. At the same time, Shippen had been listening to podcasts and believed it would be interesting to hear the conversations between a time traveller and a therapist. From that point on, the other characters came into fruition.

== Reception ==
David Chang of Medium, reviewing the first season, gave the podcast a positive review and described it as a "cross between In Treatment and X-Men". He praised the writing as "sharp and dramatic" and the voice actors' performances. He concluded by saying that while the podcast feels constrained, due to focusing solely on the therapy sessions, it manages to make it work.

Wired named The Bright Sessions one of the top 10 podcasts of 2016, describing it as "part Professor X, part Sigmund Freud", and stating that its entertaining and intriguing. Popular Science similarly praised The Bright Sessions and named it as one of the podcasts "every nerd should listen to".

== Other media ==
=== Television adaptation ===
On July 17, 2017, it was announced that Lauren Shippen was working on a television adaptation of The Bright Sessions with Gabrielle Stanton.

=== Literature ===
On January 31, 2018, it was announced that Lauren Shippen would be writing a young adult trilogy of novels set in the same universe as the podcast, to be published by Tor Teen. The first novel, The Infinite Noise was released in September 2019, and focused on Caleb and Adam during the events of the podcast. The second novel, A Neon Darkness, was released in September 2020 and followed Damien's backstory in 2006. The third novel, Some Faraway Place, was released in September 2021 and focuses on Rose Atkinson.
