= The Amelia Project =

Fiction podcast

- Running time: 19-56 min
- Country of origin: United Kingdom
- Language: English
- Starring: Alan Burgon; Julia C. Thorne; Julia Morizawa; Benjamin Noble; Torgny G. Aanderaa; Jordan Cobb; Erin King; Hemi Yeroham
- Created by: Philip Thorne; Øystein Ulsberg Brager
- Written by: Philip Thorne; Øystein Ulsberg Brager
- Directed by: Philip Thorne; Øystein Ulsberg Brager
- Produced by: Philip Thorne; Øystein Ulsberg Brager
- Original release: December 8, 2017
- No. of series: 5
- Opening theme: "The Amelia Project Theme" by Fredrik Baden
- Website: Official website

The Amelia Project is a comedy fiction podcast created, written, directed, produced and edited by Philip Thorne and Øystein Ulsberg Brager for Imploding Fictions and The Fable and Folly Network. The series stars Alan Burgon as "The Interviewer", an employee of the Amelia Project, an institution dedicated to helping individuals fake their deaths, as he interviews potential clients to decide if and how he would make them disappear and give them a new life.

Julia C. Thorne and Julia Morizawa co-starred alongside Burgon since the series' launch, with Benjamin Noble, Torgny G. Aanderaa, Jordan Cobb, Erin King, and Hemi Yeroham later joining the main cast. Although it originally heavily focused on episodic comedy, the series later developed longer story arcs, while also including mystery, fantasy, and more dramatic elements, notably diving into the elusive origins of the organization. The series also has material made available only to supporters on Patreon, including several exclusive episodes and two prequel miniseries, The Alvina Chronicles and The Arthur Archives.

== Cast ==
=== Main ===
- Alan Burgon as The Interviewer, the Amelia Project employee tasked with interviewing potential clients and planning their disappearances and new lives. Obsessed with cocoa and hearing stories, he is moody and only willing to help clients he finds interesting. Very little is originally known about him, but the series later extends on his past, revealing that he is an ageless being who has been alive for three thousand years, and whose birth name is Maine Móepirt Arthur, son of Athramail. Season 5 reveals that he's had many false names and identities in the past, including that of John Watson, and that he is the true author behind the Sherlock Holmes books; the chronicles of he and Holmes' adventures, depicted in the prequel miniseries The Arthur Chronicles, were later adapted and published as fiction by The Interviewer's friend Arthur Conan Doyle to allow the duo to remain anonymous.
- Julia C. Thorne as Alvina Wright, another employee of the Amelia Project and The Interviewer's closest associate, who often has to indulge his mood swings and keep him focused; she is in charge, among other things, of outreach. She is later revealed to be a former client of the company, whose original name before her fake death was Julia Thorpe.
- Julia Morizawa as Amelia, the leader of the Amelia Project. Morizawa is technically featured in the first two seasons via the opening message featured in the intro of every episode; instead of being credited for portraying a specific character, she is simply credited as "Julia Morizawa on the answerphone". The character of Amelia eventually makes her actual debut in the season 2 finale, in which she is revealed to be the voice on the interphone. She is the granddaughter of Martha Plum, a famous pilot the company is named after, and its former leader.
- Benjamin Noble as Agent Haines (guest season 1; main season 2-present), an MI5 agent and Cole's partner, tasked with investigating the Amelia Project. The two become increasingly obsessed with the case as they investigate it.
- Torgny G. Aanderaa as Agent Henry Cole (guest season 1; main season 2-present), an MI5 agent and Haines' partner.
- Jordan Cobb as Jackie Williams (season 3-present), a CIA agent and Fox's partner; they often butt heads with Haines and Cole, having also been tasked with investigating the Amelia Project.
- Erin King as Mia Fox (season 3-present), and CIA agent and Williams' partner.
- Hemi Yeroham as Piotr Kozlowski (guest season 3; main season 4-present), the mysterious, infinitely skilled surgeon of the Amelia Project, capable of seemingly impossible feats. Although an important part of the team since the series' debut, he is only directly featured starting with season 3, and does not speak until the season 3 epilogue episode. A cryptic man who constantly mixes fact and fiction, he is a native of Tyre, Lebanon, and a being thousands of years old like The Interviewer, with whom he shares a long and rich history, having also gone through many false names and identities.

=== Recurring guests ===
- Gianluca Iumiento as Joey, one of The Interviewer's assistants.
- Ravdeep Singh Bajwa as Salvatore, Joey's friend and The Interviewer's second assistant.
- Alex Scott Fairley as Ant (season 2-3), a scientist fascinated with bugs and microtechnology, originally introduced as a client of the Amelia Project.
- Andrei Zayats as Boris (season 3), a man overseeing The Interviewer's stay in a Russian prison.
- Alexander Mercury as Oleg (season 3), an uncommunicative Russian tasked with putting The Interviewer's interviews into text form during his time in prison.
- Federico Trujillo as Pablo Perez Garcia (season 3)
- Lory Martinez as Savannah (season 3)

== Reception ==
Wil Williams wrote in The A.V. Club that the podcast is "bizarre, hilarious, and energetic". Natalie Zutter wrote on Tor.com that the podcast is like a "comforting mug of cocoa to curl your hands around". Sean Keeley wrote in The Comeback that the podcast has an "old-timey tone and intriguing premise". Sarah Hemming wrote in the Financial Times that "This droll black comedy is best consumed with a cup of cocoa". The podcast had a 4.8 out of 5 stars on Apple Podcasts in December 2021.

== Crossovers ==
A June 2019 episode of SCP Archives, an anthology horror podcast based on SCP Foundation's fictional universe, is a crossover with The Amelia Project. The episode, titled "SCP-1171 & 'Hammer'", features Julia C. Thorne reprising her role as Alvina, and, unlike most episodes that faithfully adapt articles from the SCP Foundation, is an original story.

In August-September 2021, a three-episode miniseries, Forgive Amelia, acting as a crossover with the comedy podcast Forgive Me! were released on the Forgive Me! feed. Forgive Me! follows an interim priest receiving confessions in a small town, and the crossover series sees Casey Callaghan reprising his Forgive Me! role as Father Ben, who hears the confessions of, respectively for each episode, the Interviewer, Alvina, and Amelia, with Burgon, Thorne and Morizawa reprising their roles.

=== Awards ===
Award	Date	Category	Recipient	Result	Ref.
The One Voice Awards UK	2022	Audio Drama Best Performance - Male	Benjamin Noble	Won	
Audio Verse Awards	2021	Original Compositions in an Existing Production	"Amelia Theme S3 Mashup" by Fredrik Baden	Won	
Audio Verse Awards	2021	Original Compositions in an Existing Production	"Marcha de l'ascension" by Fredrik Baden	Won	
Audio Verse Awards	2021	Vocal Direction of an Existing Production	Philip Thorne and Oystein Brager for The Amelia Project	Won	
Audio Verse Awards	2021	Performance of a Guest Role in an Existing Production	Antigoni Spanou as Alexandra	Won	
Audio Verse Awards	2021	Performance of a Supporting Role in an Existing Production	Alex Scott Fairley as Ant	Won	
Audio Verse Awards	2021	Performance of a Leading Role in an Audio Play Production	Julia Morizawa as Amelia	Won	
Audio Verse Awards	2021	Existing Audio Play Production	The Amelia Project	Won	
Audio Verse Awards	2020	Instrumental Composition in a Production	"The Amelia Variations" by Fredrik Baden	Won	
Audio Verse Awards	2020	Writing of an Audio Play Production	Philip Thorne and Øystein Ulsberg Brager for The Amelia Project	Won	
Audio Verse Awards	2020	Performance of a Supporting Role in an Audio Play Production	Julia C. Thorne as Alvina	Won	
Audio Verse Awards	2020	Performance of a Leading Role in an Audio Play Production	Julia Morizawa as Amelia	Won	
Audio Verse Awards	2020	Cover Art for a Production	Anders N. Pedersen for The Amelia Project	Won	
Audio Verse Awards	2020	Audio Play Production	The Amelia Project	Won	
Audio Verse Awards	2019	Instrumental Composition in a Production	"The Amelia Theme Variations" by Fredrik Skaare Baden	Won	
Audio Verse Awards	2019	Performance of a Supporting Role in an Audio Play Production	Felix Trench as Bartholomew Fuckface Chucklepants Knuckle-Cracker	Won	
Audio Verse Awards	2018	Best Original Composition for a New, Comedic Production	"The Amelia Project Theme" by Fredrik Skaare Baden	Won	
Audio Verse Awards	2018	Best New, Comedic Production	The Amelia Project	Won	
Discover Pods Awards	2020	Best Audio Drama or Fiction Podcast	The Amelia Project	Won	
Discover Pods Awards	2020	Best Overall Podcast	The Amelia Project	Runner-up	
British Podcast Awards	2019	Best Fiction	The Amelia Project	Nominated	
Parsec Awards	2018	Best New Speculative Fiction Podcaster/Team	The Amelia Project	Finalist	
Austin Film Festival	2017	Fiction Podcast	The Amelia Project	Finalist	
