= Dr. Seuss' How the Grinch Stole Christmas! The Musical =

Musical

Dr. Seuss' How the Grinch Stole Christmas!
- The Musical
- Promotional poster
- Music: Mel Marvin
- Lyrics: Timothy Mason
- Book: Timothy Mason
- Basis: How the Grinch Stole Christmas! by Dr. Seuss
- Productions: 1998 San Diego; 2006 Broadway; 2007 Broadway revival 2008 US tour 2010 US tour 2019 UK tour

Dr. Seuss' How the Grinch Stole Christmas! The Musical, or simply How the Grinch Stole Christmas! The Musical, is a seasonal musical stage adaptation of the 1957 Dr. Seuss book How the Grinch Stole Christmas!. Versions of the musical have been produced since the 1990s, including a Broadway production that ran during two Christmas seasons.

== Productions ==
=== Minneapolis ===
Children's Theatre Company in Minneapolis first commissioned Dr. Seuss's How the Grinch Stole Christmas in 1994. In 2022, they presented their version of the show for the 10th time.

=== San Diego ===
The musical was performed at the Old Globe Theatre, in San Diego, California, where it has run every Christmas season since 1998. The production was directed by Jack O'Brien. This version featured songs from the 1966 animated television special, which had music by Albert Hague and lyrics by Seuss. Newcomer Vanessa Hudgens played Cindy Lou Who (in 1998 and 1999). The original cast also featured Guy Paul as The Grinch, Don Lee Sparks as Old Max, and Rusty Ross as Young Max. Notable subsequent Grinches at the Old Globe include Jay Goede, Steve Blanchard, Jeff Skowron, and Andrew Polec. Notable actors who have played Old Max include Ken Page, Steve Gunderson, and John Treacy Egan.

For the 2007 Christmas season, three new songs were added to both this and the subsequent Broadway production. These songs are "This Time of Year", "It's the Thought That Counts" and "Fah Who Foraze" (which was part of the television special).

=== Broadway ===
The musical was produced on Broadway by Running Subway (James Sanna). This version with book and lyrics by Timothy Mason, original score by Mel Marvin, was directed by Matt August and created and conceived by Jack O'Brien. Patrick Page starred as the Grinch. The Broadway production debuted on November 8, 2006, at the Foxwoods Theatre (then the Hilton theatre) for the Christmas season and closed on January 7, 2007. This production was the first Broadway musical to play 12 performances a week. In the first week of December 2006, the musical topped the Broadway Box Office grosses, ending Wicked's top-grossing streak that had lasted 100 weeks.

The musical began a second limited run at the St. James Theatre on November 9, 2007, with Patrick Page returning to the title role and starring John Cullum as Old Max. It was originally planned that the show would run continuously with up to 15 performances a week until January 6, 2008, but the show was halted before the morning matinee of November 10 as a result of the 2007 Broadway stagehand strike. The show remained dark due to failed negotiations. The producers brought the matter to court and were granted an injunction enabling the show to resume on November 23. The musical staged a total of 11 performances over the Thanksgiving weekend (November 23 to 25), an unusual occurrence for Broadway shows.

=== 2008: US tour ===
A limited-engagement tour ran during the Christmas season of 2008. The musical started at the Hippodrome in Baltimore, Maryland, from November 11 to 23, 2008, and then played the Citi Performing Arts Center Wang Theatre in Boston, Massachusetts, from November 26 to December 28. Matt August directed the show, with John DeLuca as original choreographer and Bob Richard as co-choreographer. The cast included Stefán Karl Stefánsson as the Grinch, Walter Charles as Old Max, and Andrew Keenan-Bolger as Young Max.

=== 2009: Los Angeles ===
In 2009, the musical was produced at the Pantages Theatre in Hollywood, California, and ran from November 10 to December 27. Christopher Lloyd had initially signed on to play the Grinch, but later withdrew and was replaced by Stefánsson. John Larroquette starred as Old Max, with Kayley Stallings and Issadora Ava Tulalian as Cindy Lou Who, and James Royce as Young Max.

=== 2010–2023: North American National Tours ===
In 2010, a North American tour ran in the cities of Omaha, Nebraska, Houston and Dallas, Texas, Tempe, Arizona and Toronto, Ontario. Stefánsson played the Grinch, and Carly Tamer and Brooke Lynn Boyd alternated as Cindy Lou Who.

In 2011, another tour played Providence, Rhode Island, Pittsburgh, Pennsylvania, Atlanta, Georgia, St. Louis, Missouri and San Francisco, California. Stefánsson again performed as the Grinch, with Bob Lauder as Old Max, Seth Bazacas as Young Max, Brance Cornelius as Papa Who, and Serena Brook as Mama Who and Brooke Lynn Boyd as Cindy Lou Who. In 2012, the production toured to Bloomington, Indiana, Hartford, Connecticut, Richmond, Virginia, Chicago, Illinois, and Detroit, Michigan, with Stefánsson as the Grinch.

In 2013, the production toured to Cincinnati, Ohio, Durham, North Carolina, Rochester and Buffalo, New York, and San Antonio, Texas, with Stefánsson as the Grinch. In 2014, the toured cities were Springfield, Missouri, Oklahoma City and Tulsa, Oklahoma, Albuquerque, New Mexico, Salt Lake City, Utah, Spokane and Seattle, Washington, New York City, Chicago, Costa Mesa, California, and Denver Colorado. The Grinch was played by Shuler Hensley.

In 2015, the production toured to Worcester, Massachusetts, Detroit, Michigan, Appleton, Wisconsin, Columbus, Ohio, and Jacksonville and Orlando and Fort Lauderdale, Florida. Stefánsson returned as the Grinch, with Bob Lauder as Old Max, and Genny Gagnon and Rachel Katzke as Cindy Lou Who.

In 2019, the production toured to Las Vegas, Nevada, Denver, and Detroit. Philip Bryan and Rachel Ling Gordon performed as the Grinch and Cindy Lou Who respectively.

In 2020, there was no tour due to the Coronavirus. In 2021, the tour travelled to the Belk Theater in Charlotte, NC; The National Theatre in Washington, DC; and The Fox Theatre in Atlanta.

In 2022, the tour played The Midland Center for the Arts in Midland, MI; The Orpheum Theatre in Memphis, TN; The Majestic Theatre in San Antonio, Bass Concert Hall in Austin, TX; The Saenger Theater in New Orleans, LA; and The Lied Center for Performing Arts in Lincoln, Nebraska.

In 2023, there were two Grinch companies that toured the U.S.: One tour played The Fox Theater in Detroit, MI; The Shuster Performing Arts Center in Dayton, OH; The Steven Tanger Center for the Performing Arts in Greensboro, NC; Providence Performing Arts Center in Providence, RI; Durham Performing Arts Center in Durham, NC; The Altria Theater in Richmond, VA; and The Cadillac Palace in Chicago, IL. The other tour played the First Interstate Center for the Arts in Spokane, WA; The Centre in Vancouver, CA; The Pioneer Center in Reno, NV; San Jose Center for the Performing Arts in San Jose, CA; The Pantages Theater in Los Angeles, CA; Segerstrom Center for the Arts in Costa Mesa, CA; and Safe Credit Union Performing Arts Center in Sacramento, CA.

=== 2017: Heinz Hall ===
In 2017, The national touring production of the musical ran a six-week holiday engagement at Pittsburgh's Heinz Hall from December 20 through December 24. Presented by the Pittsburgh Cultural Trust and Broadway Across America, the production was directed by Matt August with choreography by Bob Richard. Phillip Bryan played The Grinch with Andreas Wyder as Young Max, and Old Max was played by Bob Carrington.

=== 2018: Madison Square Garden ===
The musical played December 13 through December 30 at the Hulu Theater. The Grinch was played by Gavin Lee, after Stefánsson's death in August.

=== 2019: UK tour ===
The musical made its UK premiere on a tour from November 1, 2019 to January 5, 2020, stopping at New Wimbledon Theatre, SEC Armadillo, Glasgow, Motorpoint Arena Cardiff, Edinburgh Festival Theatre, The Alexandra, Birmingham and The Lowry, Salford.

=== 2020: TV Special ===
A poorly received television adaptation titled Dr. Seuss' The Grinch Musical Live! premiered on December 9, 2020, on NBC. Matthew Morrison plays The Grinch, Denis O'Hare plays Old Max, Booboo Stewart plays Young Max and Amelia Minto plays Cindy Lou Who.

=== 2026: Leeds Playhouse ===
A revival will play at Leeds Playhouse, directed by its Artistic Director Tom Wright from 19 November 2026 until 16 January 2027. Joel Montague will play The Grinch.

=== 2026: Grandstreet Theatre Production ===
A small town production of the musical will be showed 6 times at the Helena Civic Center, which will be put on by Grandstreet Theatre from 11 december 2026 until 13 December 2026 by two different casts, in which most roles will be played by kids aged from 5-18, and a few adults. The musical will be directed by Marianne Adams. The Grinch will be played by Declan Van Wyk, John Harrington as Old Max, and Ivory Strainer and Harper Mitchell playing Cindy Lou Who.

== Musical numbers ==
- "Who Likes Christmas?" – Citizens of Whoville
- "This Time of Year" – Old Max and Young Max
- "I Hate Christmas Eve" – The Grinch, Young Max and the Whos
- "Whatchama Who" – The Grinch and the Little Whos
- "Welcome, Christmas*" – Citizens of Whoville
- "I Hate Christmas Eve (Reprise)" – The Grinch
- "It's the Thought That Counts" – The Citizens of Whoville
- "One of a Kind" – The Grinch
- "Now's the Time" – Papa Who, Mama Who, Grandma Who, Grandpa Who
- "You're a Mean One, Mr. Grinch*" – Old Max, Young Max and the Grinch
- "Santa for a Day" – Cindy Lou Who and the Grinch
- "You're a Mean One, Mr. Grinch (Reprise)*" – Old Max
- "Who Likes Christmas? (Reprise)" – Citizens of Whoville
- "One of a Kind (Reprise)" – Young Max, The Grinch and Cindy Lou Who
- "This Time of Year (Reprise)" – Old Max
- "Welcome, Christmas (Reprise)*" – Citizens of Whoville
- "Santa For a Day (Reprise)" – Company
- "Who Likes Christmas? (Reprise)" – Company

Music by Albert Hague, lyrics by Dr. Seuss

== Casts ==
Character	Broadway (2006)	Broadway revival (2007)	US tour (2008)	US tour (2010)	US tour (2017)	UK tour (2019)	Grandstreet Theatre (2026)
The Grinch	Patrick Page	Patrick Page	Stefán Karl Stefánsson	Stefán Karl Stefánsson	Philip Bryan	Edward Baker-Duly	Declan Van Wyk
Old Max	John Cullum	Ed Dixon	Walter Charles	Bob Lauder	Bob Carrington	Gregor Fisher	John Harrington
Young Max	Rusty Ross; Ryan Drummond	Rusty Ross; Andrew Keenan-Bolger	Andrew Keenan-Bolger	Seth Bazacas	Andreas Wyder	Matt Terry	Vivian George-Peretto
Cindy Lou Who	Nicole Bocchi; Caroline London	Caroline London; Athena Ripka	Lexie DeBlasio; Maya Goldman	Carly Tamer; Brooke Lynn Boyd	Rachel Ling Gordon	Isla Gie; Sophie Woods; Eve Corbishley; Bebe Massey	Ivory strainer Harper Mitchell
Papa Who	Price Waldman	Aaron Galligan-Stierle	Aaron Galligan-Stierle	Brance Cornelius		Alan Pearson	Robby Felber
Mama Who	Kaitlin Hopkins	Tari Kelly	Jacquelyn Piro Donovan	Serena Brook		Holly Dale Spencer	Ella McCullough
Grandpa Who	Michael McCormick	Darin DePaul	Stuart Zagnit	Ryan Knowles		David Bardsley	Devan Brien
Grandma Who	Jan Neuberger	Jan Neuberger	Rosemary Loar	Rebecca Prescott		Karen Ascoe	Quincey Higgins
