= Little Did I Know =

Musical theater podcast

Little Did I Know is a musical theater podcast produced by Broadway Records and starring Lesli Margherita and Patrick Page.

== Background ==
The podcast was produced by Broadway Records. The show features performances by Lesli Margherita and Patrick Page. The podcast debuted on March 31, 2020 during the COVID-19 pandemic and was created from the actors' homes. The podcast is four hours long and consists of nine episodes. The first three episodes were all released on March 31 and the remaining six were released every Tuesday with the final episode being released on May 12. The show contains 22 original songs and is based on a novel by Mitchell Maxwell. The show follows a group of college graduates who fix up an old summer theater in 1976. The podcast reached number three on the Apple Podcasts charts in April 2020 and was in the top five arts podcasts in the United States. The show is a musical theater podcast similar to shows such as Anthem: Homunculus, The Two Princes, and 36 Questions.

The show was written by Dean Pitchford and Marcy Heisler. The score was written by Dean Pitchford, Marcy Heisler, and Doug Besterman. The arrangements were by Jeffrey Saver and the orchestrations was done by Michael Morris. The cast included Lesli Margherita, Laura Marano, Kurt Hugo Schneider, Sam Tsui, Casey Breves, Alex Blue, Jennifer Blood, and E. Clayton Cornelious.
