= Briggon Snow =

American actor, writer, and producer

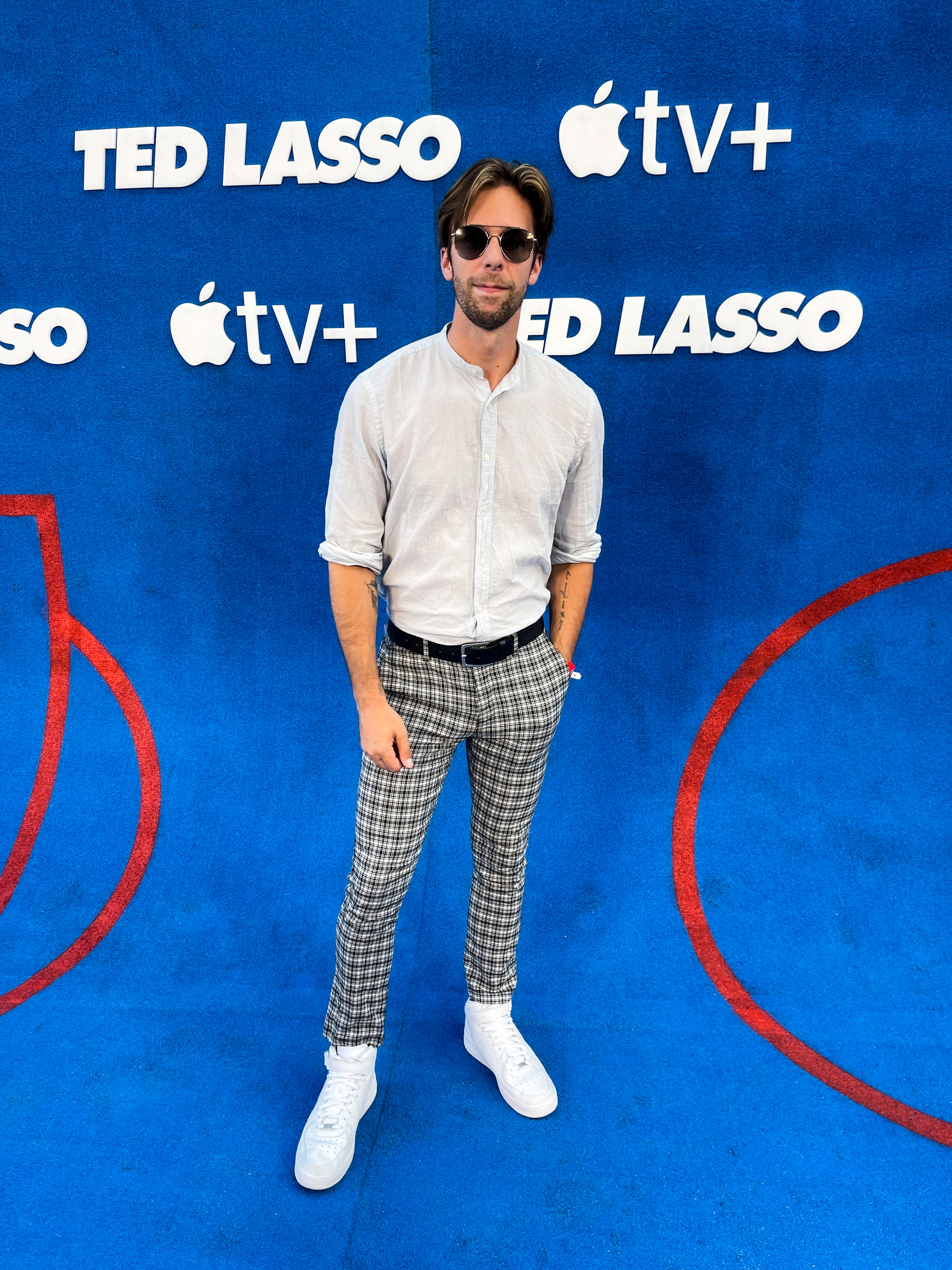
- Snow at the Ted Lasso Season 2 premiere, 2021
- Born: April 16, 1988 (age 38); South Portland, Maine, U.S.
- Education: University at Buffalo (BA)
- Occupations: Actor; writer; producer
- Years active: 2015–present
- Known for: The Bright Sessions (2015–2018)

Briggon Snow (born April 16, 1988) is an American actor, writer, and producer. He is best known for voicing Caleb Michaels in the fiction podcast The Bright Sessions (2015–2018) and its spinoff The College Tapes (2020). His television credits include recurring roles on Game Shakers (Nickelodeon) and guest appearances on SEAL Team (CBS) and Masters of Sex (Showtime). As a producer and writer, he co-wrote and produced Easy Money: The Charles Ponzi Story, an Apple Original Podcast that was an official selection of the 2025 Tribeca Festival.

== Early life and education ==
Snow was born on April 16, 1988, in South Portland, Maine. He later relocated to Los Angeles to pursue a career in acting. He holds a degree from the State University of New York at Buffalo. At age 14, Snow co-founded one of the largest online James Bond fan communities, MI6-HQ.com.

== Career ==
=== Early television work ===
Snow began his screen career with guest roles in television dramas. In 2015, he appeared on the Showtime series Masters of Sex and began a recurring role as Chad on the Nickelodeon sitcom Game Shakers, which he held throughout the show's four-season run. In 2017, he appeared in an episode of the CBS military drama SEAL Team.

=== The Bright Sessions and breakthrough in audio fiction (2015–2018) ===
In 2015, Snow was cast as Caleb Michaels, a teenage empath, in the fiction podcast The Bright Sessions, created by Lauren Shippen. The show ran until 2018 and earned significant critical attention. Vox called it "tautly written and well-acted," with Wired recommending it as essential listening. Vulture later named the podcast one of "The 10 Essential Fiction Podcasts That Shaped the Genre."

During this period Snow also appeared as a guest actor in several other fiction podcasts, including EOS 10, ars PARADOXICA, and Caravan.

Snow reprised Caleb for the spinoff limited series The College Tapes (2020), for which he also served as a guest writer, produced through Atypical Artists on the Luminary platform.

=== Expansion into audio fiction (2018–present) ===
Following The Bright Sessions, Snow became a prominent presence in the fiction podcast space. He appeared in The Big Loop; his performance in the episode "Goodbye Mr. Adams" was highlighted by The A.V. Club as among its favorite podcast performances. He also appeared in Passenger List (2019) from PRX's Radiotopia, starring alongside Kelly Marie Tran, and in Zero Hours, which was reviewed by Vox.

Snow appeared in the iHeart Media series Bridgewater (2021) as Officer McDermott, starring alongside Misha Collins, and in the Netflix companion podcast Rebel Robin: Surviving Hawkins (2021), a spinoff of Stranger Things starring Maya Hawke.

The New York Times included In Strange Woods—a musical fiction podcast in which Snow appeared as Eric—in its list of recommended podcasts. The show's development was covered by Deadline.

Snow also appeared in Audible Original productions including Witness (2022), an audio adaptation by Audible and Paramount of the 1985 Harrison Ford film, in which he played Daniel Hochleitner — a role originally played by Alexander Godunov in the film. He also appeared in Possession (2023), opposite Ebon Moss-Bachrach, in which he played Neil, and Hit Singles (2025) and QCODE's Bloodthirsty Hearts.

=== Writing, producing, and creating ===
In 2019, Snow co-founded Atypical Artists, an audio fiction production studio, alongside Lauren Shippen and Jordan Cope. The company's formation and subsequent investment from Podfund was covered by The Hollywood Reporter.

Snow created, wrote, directed, starred in, and sound designed the queer romance podcast series Look Up (2021), in which he played Lincoln Chism, opposite Evan Bittencourt, produced through Atypical Artists.

He brought the same multifaceted approach to the micro-podcast Roommates (2021), a queer romance set during the COVID-19 pandemic in which he played Casper, serving as creator, writer, director, star, and sound designer.

As a producer and actor, Snow starred as August — the main antagonist — in Academy (2023) for Wondery, which received a Webby Award honor for Scripted Fiction and was optioned for television development. He also produced Possession for Audible, which received a Podcast Academy nomination for Best Fiction Podcast.

In 2025, Snow co-wrote and produced Easy Money: The Charles Ponzi Story, an Apple Original Podcast docudrama starring Sebastian Maniscalco and hosted by journalist Maya Lau. The series was produced by AT WILL MEDIA for Apple TV+ and was an official selection of the 2025 Tribeca Festival.

=== Audiobook narration ===
Snow has narrated numerous audiobooks, including The Infinite Noise (2019) by Lauren Shippen, published by Macmillan/Tor. Kirkus Reviews praised his performance, writing that he and co-narrator James Fouhey "give stellar performances" and "authentically capture the ups and downs of teen romance." Other narration credits include First Become Ashes, Golden Boys, Afterglow, Another First Chance, When the World Tips Over, Most Valuable Player, Last Seen, and the 2026 Pulitzer Prize for Fiction finalist Stag Dance.

=== Dubbing ===
Snow has provided English voices for several Netflix productions. He voiced Ludvig (originally played by Christoffer Rigeblad) in An Honest Life (2025), and Nodon (originally played by Rúrik Gíslason) in Eat Pray Bark (2026).

== Personal life ==
Snow is openly gay and has spoken publicly about the significance of queer representation in his career. He is married and lives in the Los Angeles area.

== Filmography ==
=== Television ===
| Year | Title | Role | Network | Notes |
|---|---|---|---|---|
| 2015 | Masters of Sex | Luther | Showtime | Guest appearance |
| 2015–2018 | Game Shakers | Chad | Nickelodeon | Recurring role |
| 2017 | SEAL Team | Kowit | CBS | Guest appearance |

=== Dubbing ===
| Year | Title | Role | Network | Notes |
|---|---|---|---|---|
| 2025 | An Honest Life | Ludvig (English voice) | Netflix | English dub of Christoffer Rigeblad |
| 2026 | Eat Pray Bark | Nodon (English voice) | Netflix | English dub of Rúrik Gíslason |

=== Podcasts (selected) ===
| Year | Title | Character | Network / Studio |
|---|---|---|---|
| 2015–2018 | The Bright Sessions | Caleb Michaels | Atypical Artists |
| 2016–2018 | EOS 10 | Arule Eliano Alexander II | PlanetM |
| 2016–2018 | ars PARADOXICA | KGB Agent | The Whisperforge |
| 2016–2018 | Caravan | Carlyle | The Whisperforge |
| 2018 | The Big Loop ("Goodbye Mr. Adams") | Brady | Paul Bae |
| 2019 | Zero Hours | Ian De Vries | Long Story Short Productions |
| 2019 | Passenger List | Agent Richards | Radiotopia / PRX |
| 2019–2021 | In Strange Woods | Eric | Atypical Artists |
| 2019–2020 | Super Ordinary | Harvey Shaw | Tandon Productions |
| 2020 | The College Tapes | Caleb Michaels | Luminary / Atypical Artists |
| 2020 | Arden | Mr. Murder Man | Wheyface Radio |
| 2021 | Look Up | Lincoln Chism | Atypical Artists |
| 2021 | Roommates | Casper | Briggon Snow |
| 2021 | Life with LEO(h) | Eli | Atypical Artists |
| 2021 | Bridgewater | Officer McDermott | iHeartMedia |
| 2021 | Rebel Robin: Surviving Hawkins | Front Row Center | Netflix / Spotify |
| 2021 | Bloodthirsty Hearts | Emcee | QCODE |
| 2022 | Maxine Miles | Riley Stevens | Atypical Artists / iHeartMedia |
| 2023 | Witness | Daniel Hochleitner | Audible / Paramount |
| 2023 | Possession | Neil | Audible |
| 2023 | Academy | August | Wondery / AT WILL MEDIA |
| 2024–2026 | New Year's Day | John Fogg | Atypical Artists |
| 2025 | Hit Singles | Matt | Audible |
| 2025 | Easy Money: The Charles Ponzi Story | Detective Thompson | Apple TV+ / AT WILL MEDIA |

=== Audiobook narration (selected) ===
| Year | Title | Author | Publisher |
|---|---|---|---|
| 2019 | The Infinite Noise | Lauren Shippen | Macmillan / Tor |
| 2021 | First Become Ashes | K.M. Szpara | Macmillan / Tor |
| 2022 | Golden Boys | Phil Stamper | Penguin Random House Audio |
| 2023 | Afterglow | Phil Stamper | Penguin Random House Audio |
| 2024 | Another First Chance | Robbie Couch | Simon & Schuster |
| 2024 | When the World Tips Over | Jandy Nelson | Penguin Random House Audio |
| 2025 | Murder Between Friends | Liz Lawson | Penguin Random House Audio |
| 2025 | When We Were Monsters | Jennifer Niven | Penguin Random House Audio |
| 2025 | Most Valuable Player | A.M. Woody | Penguin Random House Audio |
| 2025 | Stag Dance | Torrey Peters | Random House Audio |
| 2026 | Sibylline | Melissa de la Cruz | Penguin Random House Audio |
| 2026 | Last Kiss of Summer | Jessica M. Felleman | Penguin Random House Audio |
| 2026 | Last Seen | Christopher Castellani | Penguin |

== Awards and nominations ==
| Year | Award | Category | Work | Result |
|---|---|---|---|---|
| 2023 | Webby Awards | Scripted Fiction (Podcast) | Academy | Honoree |
| 2024 | Podcast Academy Awards | Best Fiction Podcast | Possession | Nominated |
