= Kristian Bruun =

Canadian actor (b. 1979)

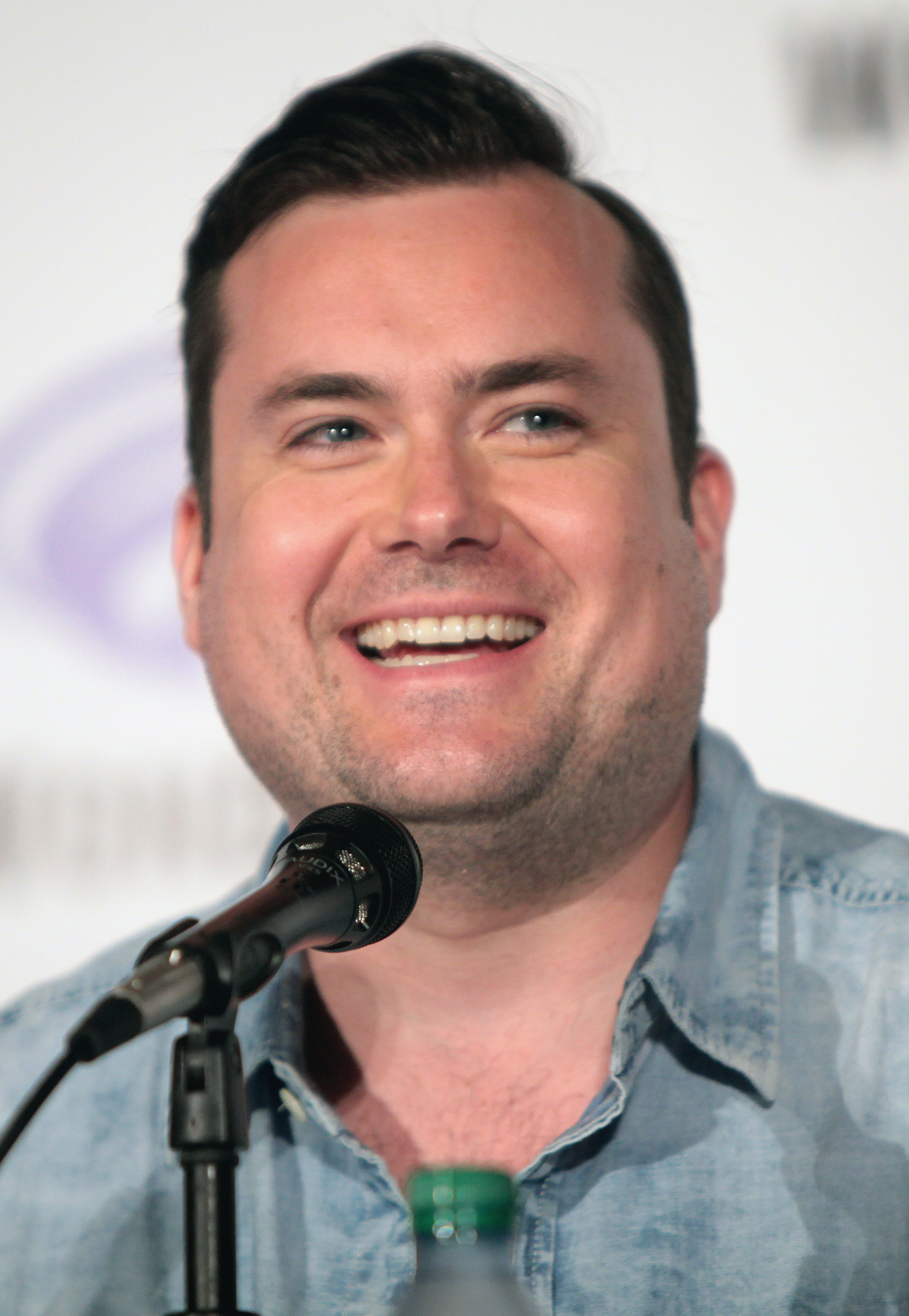
- Bruun in 2016
- Born: Charles Kristian Bonnycastle Bruun; October 25, 1979 (age 46); Toronto, Ontario, Canada
- Education: Queen's University (2001)
- Occupation: Actor
- Years active: 2004–present

Charles Kristian Bonnycastle Bruun (born October 25, 1979) is a Canadian actor. He is best known for his roles in Orphan Black, Murdoch Mysteries, The Recruit, The Girl Who Escaped: The Kara Robinson Story, and The Rookie.

== Life and career ==
Bruun was born on October 25, 1979, in Toronto, Ontario, Canada, where he was raised. He attended Valley Forge Military Academy in Pennsylvania from 1994 to 1997, followed by Queen's University in Kingston, Ontario for a B.A. in drama, graduating in 2001. He also studied at the George Brown Theatre School in Toronto and with David Rotenberg at the Professional Actors Lab.

His first screen role was in the film Good Morning Tomorrow in 2003, playing a bartender. He went on to take other roles including a Lead Officer in Nikita, Stu in Blood Pressure and Alec in Play the Film. He had an ongoing role in Murdoch Mysteries, playing Constable Slugger Jackson from 2012 to 2017, for seasons 6 through 11. His most famous role has been in the award-winning Canadian science fiction series Orphan Black, playing Donnie Hendrix, the husband of one of the main characters, Alison Hendrix. His role became larger in the third season compared to the previous two, as he became a member of the main cast.

== Filmography ==
=== Film ===
Year	Title	Role	Notes
2005	Holiday Hypnosis	Jack	
2005	Air Hockey	Hank	
2009	A Grimsville Orphanage Christmas	Custodian	Short film
2012	Build or Bust	George	Short film
2012	Blood Pressure	Stu	
2012	Hail Satan	Chris	Short film
2013	Play the Film	Alec Hess	
2013	The Doctor's Case	Dr. John Watson	Short film
2013	Boycatt		Short film
2014	Dirty Singles	English Man	
2014	Bang Bang Baby	Helmut	
2014	Agape	John	Short film
2014	True Man	Adam	Short film
2014	10 Years	Kevin Jenkins/Dad	Short film
2015	Life	Roger Love	
2015	Night Cries	David	
2015	This Is Not What You Had Planned	Hank	Short film
2015	Static	Cooking show host	Short film
2015	Regression	Andrew	
2015	Treatment	Mr. Samson	Short film
2015	Let's Rap	Stefano Chyka	
2015	How to Plan an Orgy in a Small Town	Seth Parsons	
2016	The Space Between	Teddy	
2017	Mary Goes Round	Officer Wayne	
2018	A Deadly View	Peter	
2018	Red Rover	Damon	
2018	The Go-Getters	Kevin	
2018	A Shoe Addict's Christmas	Alex	
2018	Christmas Cupcakes	Andrew Sanderson	
2019	Ready or Not	Fitch Bradley	
2019	Tammy's Always Dying	Jamie	
2020	Eat Wheaties!	Burke	
2021	Crashing through the Snow	Jeff	
2022	Slash/Back	Tony Konk	
2025	Halfway Haunted	Ghost	Short film

=== Television ===
Year	Title	Role	Notes
2003	Good Morning Tomorrow	Bartender	TV movie
2010	Covert Affairs	Hungry Passenger	Episode: "Communication Breakdown"
2011	Dark Rising: The Savage Tales of Summer Vale	Soldier #2	1 episode, miniseries
2011	Dan for Mayor	Roller Blader #1	Episode: "Insane in the Bike Lane"
2011	Change of Plans	Dennis	TV movie
2012	Nikita	Lead Officer	Episode: "Shadow Walker"
2012–2019	Murdoch Mysteries	Constable Slugger Jackson	Recurring role (seasons 5–10), Guest star (season 11)
2013–2017	Orphan Black	Donnie Hendrix	Recurring role (seasons 1–2), Main cast (seasons 3–5)
2016	11.22.63	Dr. Ronald Jones	2 episodes
2016–2018	Tactical Girls	Detective Laurence	2 episodes
2016–2017	That's My DJ	Peter	5 episodes
2016	The Girlfriend Experience	Client #2	Episode: "Fabrication"
2016	Con Man	Boom Dude	Episode: "A Small Step for Manly" (uncredited)
2017	The Beaverton	Dr. Channing	Episode #1.8
2017	Annedroids	Bully Dad	Episode: "Enemy Lines"
2017–2018	The Handmaid's Tale	Doctor	3 episodes
2018–2019	Carter	Dave Leigh	Main cast
2018	Impulse	Sheldon Gibson	2 episodes
2019	Departure	Hoffman	Main cast
2019	Hudson & Rex	Vern Matheson	Episode: "Strangers in the Night"
2020	Avocado Toast	Jake	Recurring role (season 1), web series
2020	Good Witch	Kenny Cooper	Episode: "The Chocolates"
2021–2022	Family Law	Dr. Doug Peterson	2 episodes
2022–2024	Snowpiercer	Stu Whiggins	4 episodes
2022–2025	The Recruit	Janus Ferber	Main cast
2023–2024	The Rookie	Boyd Taylor	2 episodes
2023	The Girl Who Escaped: The Kara Robinson Story	Richard Evonitz	TV movie

=== Podcasts ===
Year	Title	Voice role	Notes
2015–2024	Comedy Bang! Bang!	Himself	11 episodes
2019	The AM Archives	Oliver Ritz	7 episodes
2019	Passenger List	William Schroeder	Episode: "Kinshasa"
2020	The College Tapes	Oliver Ritz	10 episodes
2020–2021	In Strange Woods	Declan	4 episodes
2021–2022	Orphan Black: The Next Chapter	Donnie Hendrix	7 episodes
