= Passenger List =

Scripted thriller podcast by Radiotopia

Passenger List is a thriller podcast produced by Radiotopia and starring Kelly Marie Tran.

== Background ==
The podcast debuted on September 16, 2019. The podcast was produced by Radiotopia. The podcast stars Kelly Marie Tran, alongside Colin Morgan, Rob Benedict, and Patti LuPone. The story follows Kaitlin Le, who is investigating the mysterious disappearance of a plane.

== Reception ==
Alexis Soloski wrote in The New York Times that "the voice talent is strong, particularly Tran, who grounds the narrative". The podcast received five out of five microphones from Podcast Magazine. Jack Seale wrote in The Guardian that the podcast is an "addictively plotty drama."

Passenger List won the People's Voice Webby Award in the Scripted Podcast category at the 2020 Webby Awards. The first season also won Gold in the Best Fiction category at the 2020 British Podcast Awards and was "Highly Commended" in the running for Podcast of the Year. It also received a Best Fiction Podcast nomination at the 2020 IHeartRadio Podcast Awards. The second season of the podcast won "Best Podcast or Online Audio Drama" at the 2022 BBC Audio Drama Awards.

== Adaptation ==
The podcast was optioned for a television series by Weimaraner Republic Pictures and Warner Bros. Television Studios.
