= Beyond the Chamber of Terror =

- Directed by: Michael Pereira
- Written by: Michael Pereira
- Produced by: Berge Karageusian; Craig Lobo; Michael Pereira
- Starring: Timothy Paul McCarthy; Jessica Vano; Ry Barrett; Sigourney McAuley; Derek Gilroy; Robert Nolan
- Cinematography: Michael Jari Davidson
- Edited by: Christopher Guest
- Music by: Jason Simons
- Production companies: Shocking Dark; Panic Button Films
- Distributed by: Terror Films
- Release dates: 20 November 2021 (The Blood in the Snow Film Festival); 11 October 2024 (internet)
- Running time: 93 minutes
- Country: Canada
- Language: English

Beyond the Chamber of Terror is a 2021 Canadian comedy horror film written and directed by Michael Pereira, starring Timothy Paul McCarthy, Jessica Vano, Ry Barrett, Sigourney McAuley, Derek Gilroy and Robert Nolan.

== Cast ==
- Timothy Paul McCarthy as Nash Caruthers
- Jessica Vano as Ava Ackerman
- Ry Barrett as Lennox
- Sigourney McAuley as Casey
- Derek Gilroy as Benny
- Robert Nolan as Russell Ackerman
- Storm Steenson as Lenora Gimble
- Ian Dyck as Dr. Killian
- Ian Ottis Goff as Montoya
- Seth O'Shea as Tyler Ackerman
- Jason Tannis as Graham Hamilton
- Steve Kasan as Gino
- Harmonie Hemming as Mrs. Caruthers

== Release ==
The film premiered at the Blood in the Snow Canadian Film Festival in 20 November 2021. It was made available digitally on 11 October 2024.

== Reception ==
Charlie Cargile of PopHorror called the film a "loving tribute to the splatter films of the 80’s" and praised the performances of McCarthy, Vano, Barrett and Steenson, as well as the characterisation of the characters Nash and Ava. Jacob Davison of iHorror.com gave the film a score of 3.5/5 and wrote: "While not the most inventive horror comedy, and leaning perhaps a bit much on the nostalgia factor, I can still appreciate that Chamber of Terror has a lot of drive and inventiveness. A madcap crime comedy turned splattterflick with some decent reveals that really made it stand out." Davison praised the setting, calling it "just as much a character as anyone else in the film", as well as the FX. Brendan Jesus of Horror Obsessive wrote: "There is a good movie somewhere in this mess, but its almost accidental B-ness of it all just muddies the waters and makes the movie feel more like a drag and less like a romp."
