= Starsuckers =

Starsuckers may refer to:

- Starsuckers (2009 film), a British documentary film
- Starsuckers (2026 film), a Canadian horror film
- an alternate name for the 1999 Nine Inch Nails song "Starfuckers, Inc."
