= Butler Brothers (filmmakers) =

Canadian filmmakers

Brett M. Butler and Jason G. Butler, known together professionally as the Butler Brothers, are Canadian film directors, writers and producers. They are known for darkly funny, character driven movies, including First Round Down, Mourning Has Broken, and Confusions of an Unmarried Couple. The pair have been collaborating since 2005 and have also co-produced feature films from other writer/directors including Love in the Sixth by Jude Klassen and The Notorious Newman Brothers by Ryan Noel, which they also starred in.

== Early lives ==
The Butler Brothers were born and primarily raised in Toronto, Ontario, by their parents, Robert and Barbara (née MacPherson). They both graduated from Earl Haig Secondary School in Toronto. Jason attended Laurentian University and Brett enrolled at Carleton University.

== Career ==
Opting out of his final year at Carleton, Brett moved back to Toronto and began working on a script with Jason that would eventually become their first feature film, Alive and Lubricated. Shot with a shoestring budget on 16mm film, it was a crash course in indie filmmaking for the Butlers who wrote, produced, directed, acted and edited the film. The Butlers quickly began production on their second feature, Bums, once again sharing duties as writer, producer, director and editor, eventually releasing both films independently. With two actors (one being Brett) and no budget the Butlers shot their third feature, Confusions of an Unmarried Couple, a story revolving around a former couple debating whether or not they should get back together - it was a critical success. In 2012 the Butlers were among thirty-five filmmakers that submitted to the $1K Film Challenge created by independent filmmaker Ingrid Veninger. Their pitch was one of five that were selected for production. With a budget of $1,000 it became their fourth feature, Mourning Has Broken. Around that same time the Butlers starred in the debut feature by Ryan Noel, The Notorious Newman Brothers, which they also co-wrote and produced with Noel. In 2016 the Butler Brothers released their fifth feature film, First Round Down, an action-comedy starring Dylan Bruce. All five of their films have been produced under their film production company banner, Substance Production and are known as "Butler Brother Brews".

In 2015 the Butlers co-produced, edited and had supporting roles in Jude Klassen's debut feature film, Love in the Sixth.

== Filmography ==
- Alive and Lubricated (2005)
- Bums (2006)
- Confusions of an Unmarried Couple (2008)
- The Notorious Newman Brothers (2010)
- Mourning Has Broken (2013)
- First Round Down (2016)
- Starsuckers (2026)
