= Tom Gregory (producer) =

American entertainer and political commentator

- Born: April 24, 1960; Camden, New Jersey, US
- Occupations: writer, collector, actor, producer
- Known for: commentary, memorabilia collection, actor, model

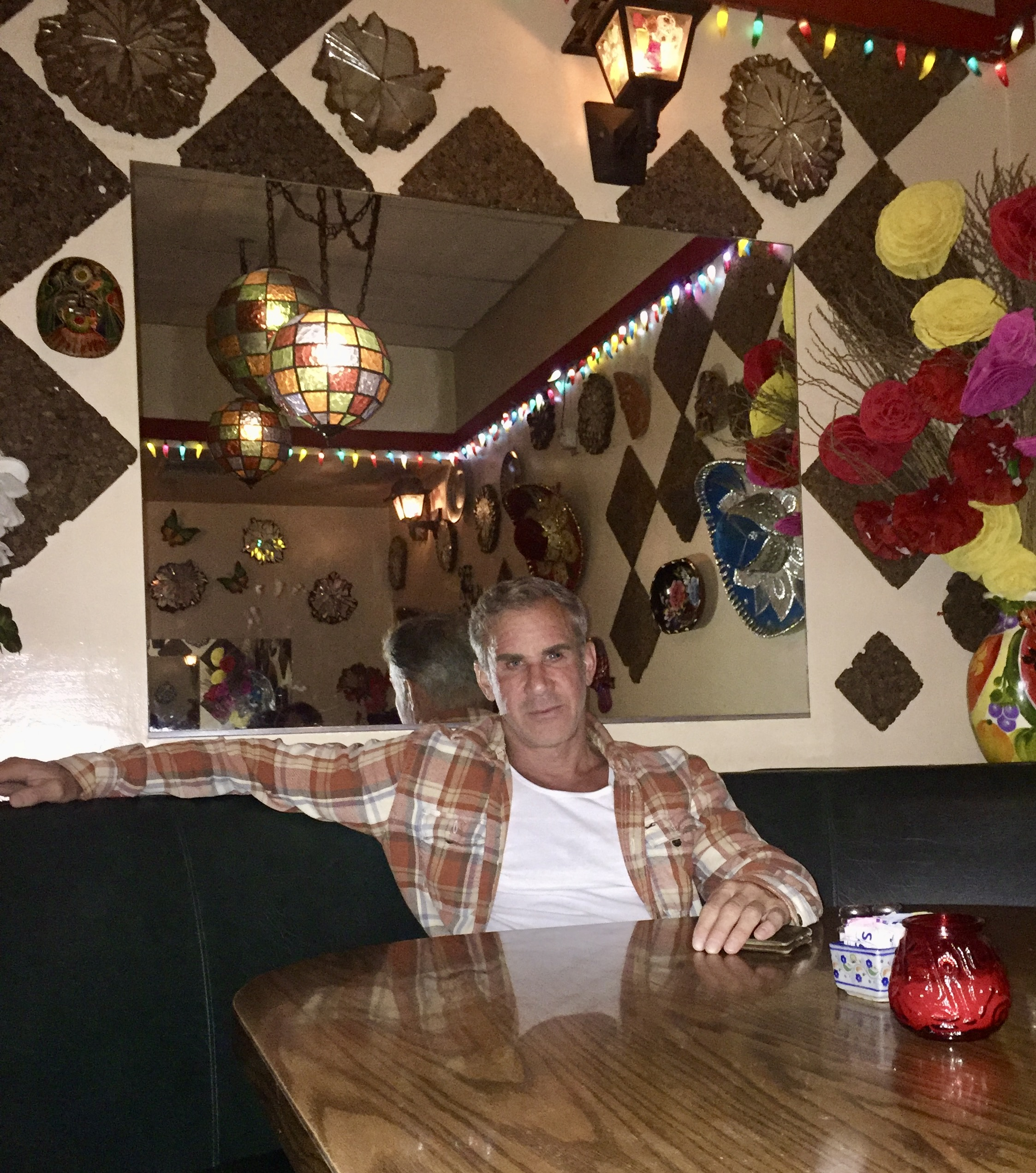
Tom Gregory sits in El Coyote at the table where, on her final evening of life, Sharon Tate dined.

Tom Gregory (born April 24, 1960) is an American entertainer and socio-political commentator, actor and model.

== Biography ==
Tom Gregory is an actor, writer, radio personality, and socio-political and entertainment industry commentator. Throughout the nineties, he traveled the world as a model with THE GAP. In 2021, he appeared opposite Rich Little in Trial on the Potomac. He maintains a home in Southampton, NY, and an apartment in Manhattan's historic co-op, the Rockefeller Apartments.

Tom and philanthropist and technology entrepreneur David Bohnett were domestic partners for over eleven years.

== Media ==
Tom Gregory's media forums included his YouTube webisode Gregory Way TV, a Huffington Post column, and regular radio dispatches for Leeza Gibbons' internationally syndicated program Hollywood Confidential. He has also been featured on CNN, E!, and Fox News, among other outlets. He was the face of OVGuide.com, one of the Internet's leading sources for indexing online video content. Gregory earned a TONY nomination as producer on the 2009 revival of Guys and Dolls at Broadway's Nederlander Theatre. In 2019 he developed and produced TO DIE FOR a spec, comedy TV show about Hollywood's fear of death.

== Hollywood memorabilia ==
Tom Gregory has been a noted collector of autographed, archival Hollywood photographs. Included in his collection are a photo of Marilyn Monroe circa 1955 that is personalized to James Dean; an image of Boris Karloff in full Frankenstein monster regalia; an exquisite portrait of Greta Garbo that is one of only a few known copies in the world, and the largest photo known to be signed by Abraham Lincoln. In an auction event, in December 2016 he auctioned off a great percentage of that collection through RR Auction.

Hollywood memorabilia in his collection are the cowboy shirts worn by Heath Ledger and Jake Gyllenhaal in the film Brokeback Mountain as well as the suit, shirt, tie and campaign pin worn by Sean Penn during his Oscar-winning performance in Milk The auction bids for these items have benefited different children's charities.

== Philanthropy ==
Tom Gregory's philanthropic involvement spans both coasts. In Los Angeles, he taught after-school acting classes for preteens, drawing on his own acting experience gained in repertory companies in East Hampton, New York, Delray Beach, Florida, and across the United States.

In Southampton New York, and New York City Tom participates in several theatrical endeavors.

Tom Gregory helped found the Lake Agawam Conservation Association to help clean up the Southampton lake's fragile eco-system. He is adamantly against Litter, for years picking it up during runs along Mulholland Drive, serving as an example to that street's most famous residents, and its constant tour buses.

== LGBT rights ==
As an ardent supporter of human rights and civil liberties, for years Tom wrote prolifically on LGBTQ issues in his articles for the Huffington Post. His media and philanthropic efforts on the behalf of the LGBTQ communities rest on his faith in the institution of America's promise of equality and justice for all its citizens. He was also a major contributor to the "No on Prop 8" campaign. He is a Libertarian with fluid political views.
