= Mourning Has Broken (film) =

2013 film by the Butler Brothers

Mourning Has Broken is a 2013 Canadian dark comedy film written and directed by the Butler Brothers. The film stars Robert Nolan as a man who wakes up to find that his ailing wife, laying beside him in bed, has died in the middle of night. After finally getting out of bed the husband proceeds to go about the day as if nothing has happened, systematically going through his 'to-do' list that was left on the fridge for him by his wife. As the husband attempts to complete the tasks, his interactions with various people and things along the way become increasingly aggressive, often in a darkly funny manner. As he completes his list it becomes very clear that he is not coping with the loss of his wife very well at all, becoming emotionally unhinged, resulting in him taking his own life at the end.

The film premiered at the 2013 Calgary International Film Festival. The US premiere was at the 2013 Anchorage International Film Festival where it won the Audience Choice Award. The film was released theatrically in Canada on January 24, 2014 by Indiecan Entertainment.

== Cast ==
- Robert Nolan as Husband
- Shawn Devlin as Neighbor
- Jennifer DeLucia as Clerk
- JoAnn Nordstrom as Bartender
- Graham Kent as Mechanic
- Brett M. Butler as Homeboy
- Jason G. Butler as Father
- Damien Gulde as Hipster
- Kevin Scott as Salesman
- Serena Miller as Bimbo
- Mike Donis as Douche
