= Marc Ostrick =

American filmmaker (born 1973)

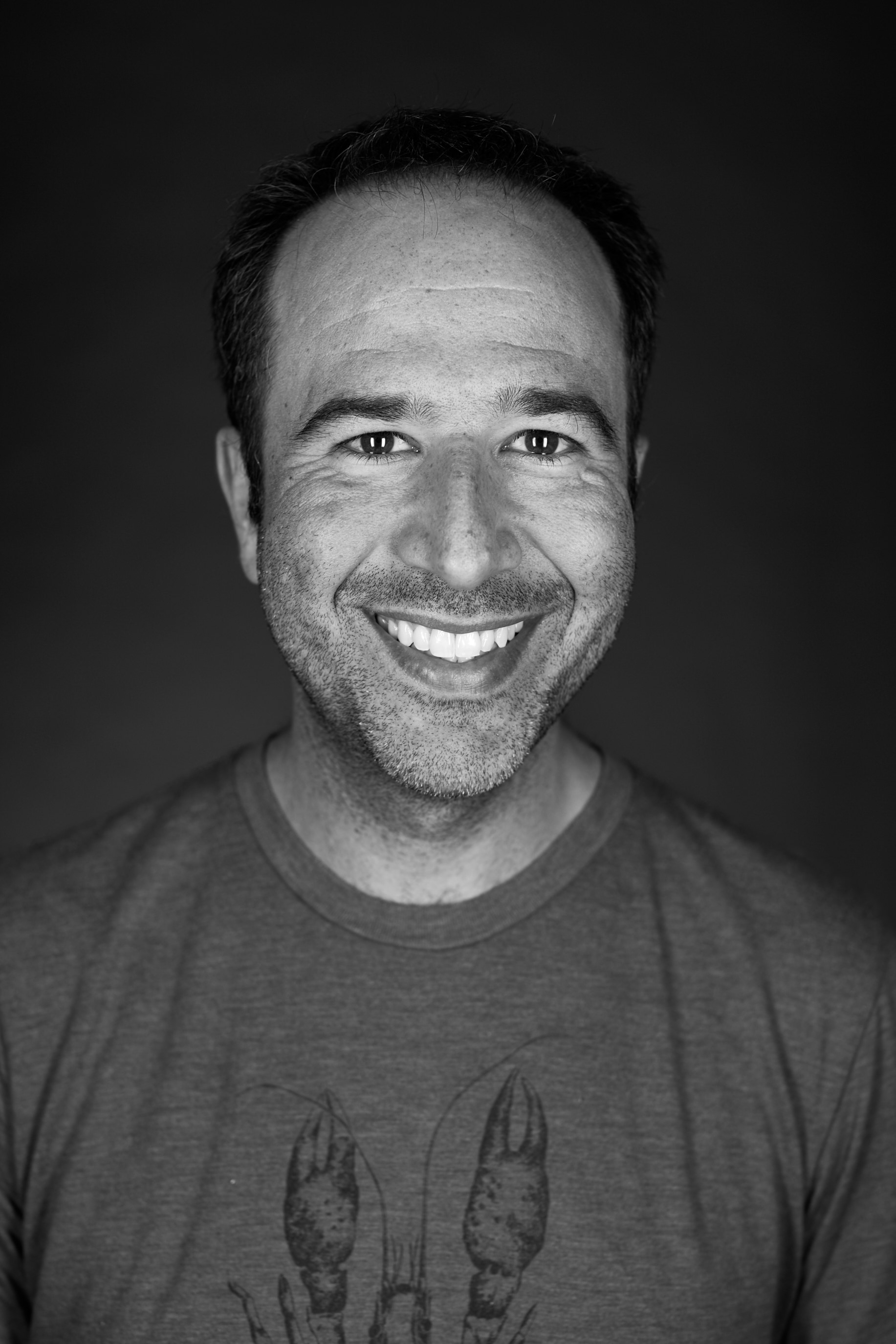
- Occupations: Filmmaker, environmentalist, explorer

Marc Ostrick (born 1973) is an American born filmmaker and content creator.

== Education ==
He attended the New World School of the Arts in Miami, Florida for High-School before attending New York University Tisch School of the Arts for his Undergraduate in Film & Television Production and English Literature. In 1994, Ostrick and Ezra Soiferman premiered their award-winning NYU thesis film, Pressure Drop, which started their professional carriers in the entertainment industry.

== Career ==
Ostrick's career began after graduating from NYU, establishing himself in the entertainment industry. His early work includes producing and directing award-winning documentaries and digital content for a variety of platforms. In 2009 Marc Ostrick launched eGuiders, a website to curate and recommend the videos across the internet from industry experts.

Ostrick co-directed 24: Conspiracy, a narrative series made specifically for mobile devices in 2005. 24: Conspiracy was a digital spin off to the television series 24 and was nominated for an Emmy Award in the Broadband Entertainment category. Ostrick also worked on the production of a series on online videos that served as a transmedia storytelling continuation of the HBO series, John From Cincinnati (2006 - 2007).

He directed and co-executive produced Deadly Sharks of Paradise and Monsters of the Bermuda Triangle, both of which aired on Discovery and the MAX streaming service as part of Shark Week 2023.

His contributions to Shark Week also include producing and/or directing multiple specials, such as Deadly Sharks of Paradise (2023), Monsters of the Bermuda Triangle (2023), Return to Shark Vortex (2021), Tiger Shark Invasion (2018) Lair of the Sawfish (2018), Shark Vortex (2016) and Deadliest Shark (2016).

Beyond Shark Week, Ostrick has been a key figure in the production of the Stripped documentary film series. Stripped: Nashville (2024) is the latest release in the series, following Stripped: Las Vegas (2021) and Stripped: Los Angeles (2020).

In addition to his work in television and documentary film, Ostrick has collaborated with organizations such as the U.S. State Department and various NGOs. Between 2018 and 2020, he worked on the ChangeChitra program in India, an initiative designed to train social activists in documentary filmmaking. He also worked on Dream Big!, an IMAX film that aimed to inspire the next generation of STEM leaders, which became the highest-grossing large-screen film of 2018.

His work as producer and director also include Mission 31, a multi-platform project led by ocean explorer Fabien Cousteau. He has also directed a documentary called Mega Hammerhead for Nat Geo Wild’s Sharkfest program and worked with major networks and production companies like HBO, Paramount and New Line Cinema.

From 2011 to 2013 Ostrick served as the Director of Digital Production at MacGillivray Freeman Films, the renowned IMAX production company, where he oversaw their award-winning One World One Ocean media campaign and expanded the universe of their IMAX films with behind the scenes and online educational series.

He is a member of the Producers Guild of America (PGA) and the International Documentary Association (IDA).

Marc Ostrick's other credits include:

- Open Hearted-Feature Documentary (2002) (director / producer)
- Without A Net: Creating NYPD Blue- Feature Documentary (2000) (director, writer, camera, editor)
- He was the Showrunner for Roku Recommends.

== Personal life ==
Marc Ostrick currently resides in Laguna Beach with his wife and daughter.
