= Sheldon Andelson =

American politician

Sheldon Andelson (March 5, 1931 – December 29, 1987) was an American higher education administrator and a political fund-raiser.

== Biography ==
Sheldon "Shelley" Andelson was born in Cook County, Illinois and raised in the Boyle Heights area of Los Angeles, at the time a Jewish enclave of the city, and went on to have a lucrative career in law and real estate. He was the first openly gay University of California Regent. In describing Andelson, the Los Angeles Times called him a "Democratic Party heavyweight, once regarded as the nation's most influential gay political figure." Andelson was nominated to the Board of Regents by Governor Jerry Brown. He survived a nasty confirmation battle and served as a University of California Regent from 1982 to 1987. He was instrumental in the appointment of one of the first openly gay judges in California, Rand Schrader. At Andelson's urging, California Governor Jerry Brown appointed Schrader to the Los Angeles Municipal Court in 1980. Andelson was also a fund-raiser for Senator Edward M. Kennedy and Walter F. Mondale.

Andelson was the half-brother of lawyer Roger Horwitz, who was the partner of poet Paul Monette. Monette details the relationship between Horwitz and Andelson in his book 'Borrowed Time: An AIDS Memoir' .

Other notable accomplishments, honors and contributions include, founder and Chairman of the Bank of Los Angeles, a member of the Anti-Defamation League of B'nai B'rith, a founder of the Museum of Contemporary Art, director of the ACLU Foundation, and a member of a committee of the 1984 Olympic Games held in Los Angeles. Additionally, Andelson was one of the first directors of the "Los Angeles Gay and Lesbian Community Services Center". Mr. Andelson was a graduate of Stanford University and USC Law School. Andelson served as a member of the Finance Committee of the Democratic National Committee [DNC] and spoke at the 1980 Democratic National Convention, held in New York City.

Sheldon Andelson was a lead partner in the 1980s trendy Melrose Avenue restaurant "Trumps". At the time, one of Los Angeles' most popular and exclusive dining spots. Andelson was also owner of The 8709 Club Baths, a popular gay nightlife spot.

The Andelson Collection at the University of California, Santa Barbara Library is named in his honor. Located in the Ethnic and Gender Studies Library, the Collection "supports the teaching curriculum and research interests of faculty and students in gay, lesbian, bisexual, transgender and studies in all disciplines".

On December 29, 1987, aged 56, Andelson died of complications related to AIDS.
