= OVGuide =

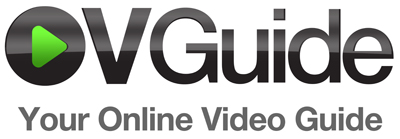
- OVGuide logo
- Website type: Online video website directory and video search engine
- Owners: FOTV Media Networks, Inc.
- Creators: Dale Bock, Founder; David Bohnett, Chairman
- Website: www.ovguide.com
- Registration: Not required for most services
- Launched: July 2006

OVGuide is a website aggregator which allowed users to find online video content. The company was acquired by FOTV Media Networks Inc. for over $10M in 2016.

== Included sites ==
Sites are submitted by users and selected based on editorial review. Once a site is approved for inclusion, it is categorized according to its niche content. Editors do not review specific video titles, but look at the overall quality of a site, such as checking for enough unique video content, potential spyware, excessive ads, or other factors which would make a video site unacceptable for inclusion.

== Special events ==
In 2009, OVGuide participated as one of the exclusive live streamers of Leeza Gibbons' 'A Night to Make a Difference' an Oscar dinner and charity celebration, the first time an Academy Awards Oscar Party was streamed online.

== Acquisitions ==
In 2010 OVGuide acquired IBeatYou. The total deal was worth $2.975M, with $1.487M in earnout. IBeatYou was later acquired from OVGuide by Photobucket in an all-stock transaction.

Live Matrix was acquired by OVGuide in early 2012. Sanjay Reddy replaced Peter Lee as CEO.

== See also ==
- Eguiders
- YouTube
- Tubefilter
