= EGuiders =

American online video website

eGuiders
- Website type: Online video Internet
- Website: eguiders.com
- Launched: February 2009; 17 years ago
- Current status: Active

eGuiders is a Hollywood-based website that aims to be the TV Guide for online video. Launched in February 2009, eGuiders features videos that are curated daily by Hollywood creators and executives such as Lost co-creator Damon Lindelof, comedian Jerry Stiller, and 24 executive producer Jon Cassar. The site's principal adviser is David Milch, the creator of NYPD Blue and Deadwood.

== Background ==
eGuiders sprung from a conversation between a new media producer, Marc Ostrick, and a Columbia University professor, Evangeline Morophos in response to growing clutter of online video. They had considered collaborating on a book on the evolution of online video, but opted to gather a group of friends and colleagues to directly help people cut through the clutter. Hollywood professionals currently participating with eGuiders include:

- Mark Tinker: Executive Producer of Private Practice
- Damon Lindelof: Co-creator of Lost
- Jerry Stiller: Comedian (Frank Costanza on Seinfeld)
- Shawn Ryan: Executive Producer of The Shield
- John Landis: Director of Animal House and The Blues Brothers
- David Milch: Creator of NYPD Blue and Deadwood
- Willie Garson: Actor (Standford on Sex and the City)
- Brady Brim-DeForest: Co-founder of Tubefilter
- Tim Street: Creator of French Maid TV
- Daisy Whitney: New media journalist and critic
- Zack Whedon: Co-Writer of Dr. Horrible's Sing-Along Blog

== See also ==
- OVGuide
- Tubefilter
