= List of Orphan Black characters =

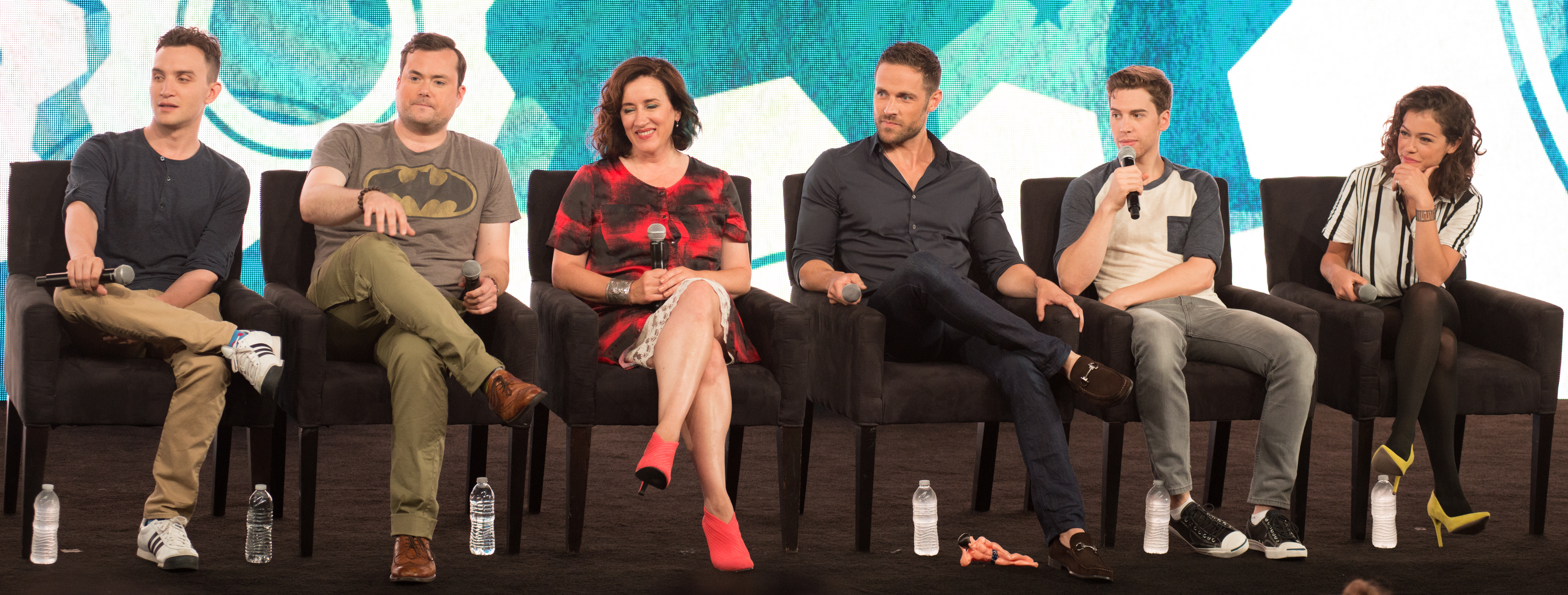
Several Orphan Black cast members at NerdHQ in 2014. (L-R: Millen, Bruun, Doyle Kennedy, Bruce, Gavaris, and Maslany).

Orphan Black is a Canadian science fiction television series broadcast on Space in Canada and on BBC America in the United States. The series' first season stars Tatiana Maslany, Dylan Bruce, Jordan Gavaris, Kevin Hanchard, Michael Mando, and Maria Doyle Kennedy, with the addition of Evelyne Brochu to the regular cast in the second season, Kristian Bruun and Ari Millen in the third, and Josh Vokey in the fourth. Orphan Black revolves around the main character of Sarah Manning as she discovers the existence of several of her genetic identicals. Numerous actors appear in the series as recurring cast members, but some guest actors are featured in only a few. Particularly, Skyler Wexler often recurs as Sarah's daughter Kira.

== Appearances ==
List indicator

This section includes characters who will appear or have appeared in each season.

- A green cell indicates the actor is a main cast member.
- A red cell indicates the actor is a recurring cast member.
- A light blue cell indicates the actor is a guest or special guest cast member.
- A dark gray cell indicates the actor has not participated in the respective season.

Overview of starring and supporting appearances
Portrayer	Character(s)	Number of appearances					
Portrayer	Character(s)	S1	S2	S3	S4	S5	Total
Starring
Tatiana Maslany	Sarah Manning	10	10	10	10	10	50
Tatiana Maslany	Cosima Niehaus	9	10	10	10	10	49
Tatiana Maslany	Alison Hendrix	8	9	9	9	7	42
Tatiana Maslany	Helena	7	8	10	5	8	38
Tatiana Maslany	Rachel Duncan	2	8	6	6	9	31
Tatiana Maslany	Elizabeth "Beth" Childs	1		1	5	1	8
Tatiana Maslany	Krystal Goderitch			3	3	1	7
Tatiana Maslany	Veera "M.K." Suominen				6	1	7
Tatiana Maslany	Pupok (voice) (Note: Pupok is the only character played by Maslany who is not a Leda clone. Pupok is a hallucination of Helena's of a talking scorpion voiced by Maslany.)			5			5
Tatiana Maslany	Katja Obinger	1					1
Tatiana Maslany	Tony Sawicki		1				1
Tatiana Maslany	Jennifer Fitzsimmons		1				1
Tatiana Maslany	"Church Clone"					1	1
Tatiana Maslany	Camilla Torres					1	1
Tatiana Maslany	OVERALL	10	10	10	10	10	50
Ari Millen	Mark Rollins		8	7		3	18
Ari Millen	Ira Blair				8	5	13
Ari Millen	Rudy		1	9			10
Ari Millen	Styles Miller		1	5			6
Ari Millen	Seth			2			2
Ari Millen	Parsons			1			1
Ari Millen	OVERALL		8	9	8	8	33
Jordan Gavaris	Felix "Fee" Dawkins	10	10	10	10	7	47
Maria Doyle Kennedy	Siobhán "S" Sadler	9	7	8	8	8	40
Kristian Bruun	Donnie Hendrix	6	8	9	8	7	38
Kevin Hanchard	Arthur "Art" Bell	8	8	4	9	8	37
Josh Vokey	Scott Smith	2	7	9	8 (Note: Josh Vokey is credited as a special guest for his first two appearances of the season in episodes 2 and 3. Subsequent appearances are credited as series regular.)	9	35
Evelyne Brochu	Delphine Cormier	6	9	6	2	5	28
Dylan Bruce	Paul Dierden	10	5	4	3 (Note: Dylan Bruce is only credited for appearing in the first two episodes of season 4. Subsequent appearances are uncredited.)		22
Michael Mando	Victor "Vic" Schmidt	5	3				8
Supporting
Skyler Wexler	Kira Manning	9	9	4	7	10	39
Cynthia Galant	Young Rachel Duncan / Charlotte Bowles		4	2	6	7	19
Zoé de Grand'Maison	Gracie Johanssen		7	8		2	17
Millie Davis	Gemma Hendrix	4	5	5	1	1	16
Inga Cadranel	Angela "Angie" Deangelis	8	6		1		15
Kyra Harper	Virginia Coady			9		6	15
Calwyn Shurgold	Hell-Wizard			1	6	8	15
Rosemary Dunsmore	Susan Duncan			2	8	3	13
Matt Frewer	Aldous Leekie	5	4		1	1	11
Ron Lea	Gavin (or Mike) Hardcastle	8			1	2	11
Drew Davis	Oscar Hendrix	4	5		1		10
James Frain	Ferdinand Chevalier			3	3	2	8
Lauren Hammersley	Adele				4	4	8
Terra Hazelton	Sarah Stubbs		4	2	2		8
Gord Rand	Martin "Marty" Duko				8		8
Nicholas Rose	Colin	5	1			2	8
Jessalyn Wanlim	Evie Cho				8		8
Ryan Blakely	Reverend Mike	1	1		3	2	7
Natalie Lisinska	Aynsley Norris	5	1			1	7
Tom McCamus	Alan Nealon		1	6			7
Stephen McHattie	Percival "P.T." Westmorland/John Paterick Mathieson					7	7
Andrew Moodie	Simon Frontenac					7	7
Julian Richings	Benjamin Kertland		4		3		7
Matthew Bennett	Daniel Rosen	1	5				6
Kristin Booth	Bonnie Johanssen		4	2			6
Andrew Gillies	Ethan Duncan		5	1			6
Michiel Huisman	Cal Morrison		5	1			6
Géza Kovács	The Messenger				3	3	6
Elyse Levesque	Detective Maddy Enger					6	6
Ksenia Solo	Shay Davydov			6			6
Eileen Sword	Sister Irina					6	6
Amanda Brugel	Marci Coates			5			5
Miranda Edwards	Roxie				5		5
Jenessa Grant	Mud					5	5
Sirena Gulamgaus	Aisha Yasin					5	5
Daniel Kash	Tomas	3	1			1	5
Peter Outerbridge	Henrik Johanssen		5				5
David Richmond-Peck	Olivier Duval	4			1		5
Diana Salvatore	Bobby	1	1	2		1	5
Alison Steadman	Kendall Malone			2	3		5
Scott Wentworth	Ian Van Lier				3	2	5
Raymond Ablack	Raj Singh	3			1		4
Tom Barnett	David Benchman			4			4
Justin Chatwin	Jason Kellerman			4			4
Carlos Gonzalez-Vio	Dr. Silva			4			4
Stuart Hughes	Cooper					4	4
Joel Thomas Hynes	Dizzy				4		4
Anika Johnson	The "Blood Ties" pianist		3		1		4
Barbara Johnston	Kelsey		3		1		4
Homa Kameh	Aisha's Mother					4	4
Allie MacDonald	Trina				4		4
Ian Matthews	Frank				4		4
Alex Ozerov	Ramone		1	1	1	1	4
Priya Rao	Meera Kumar	3	1				4
Jean Yoon	Janis Beckwith	3			1		4
Kathryn Alexandre	Alexis McGann		1	2			3
Kristi Angus	Charity Simms	2	1				3
Sarain Boylan	Astrid	1			2		3
Christy Bruce	Young Susan Duncan		2	1			3
Tony Cianchino	Pouchy Pouzihno	1		2			3
Raven Dauda	Yvonne		3				3
Michelle Forbes	Marion Bowles		3				3
Elie Gemael	Hashem Al-Khatib					3	3
Victor Gomez	Salvador					3	3
Carter Hayden	Paul		3				3
Eric Johnson	Chad Norris	2				1	3
Alex Karzis	Alexander		3				3
Trenna Keating	Vera			3			3
Allen Keng	Painmaker		1	2			3
Danny MacDonald	Martin Funt		3				3
Earl "Bubba" McLean	Teddy	1	1			1	3
Andrew Musselman	Yanis "The Creature"					3	3
Earl Pastko	Bulldog			3			3
Joe Pingue	Troy Collier				3		3
Vas Saranga	Amar					3	3
Kent Sheridan	Conrad		3				3
David Vena	João	1		2			3
Patrick J. Adams	Jesse		1	1			2
Michelle Arvizu	La Camarera			2			2
Marqus Bobesich	Rockabilly Bob	2					2
Dmitry Chepovetsky	Henry Bosch				2		2
Jamila Fleming	Sherry	2					2
Gavin Fox	Lionel			2			2
Humberly González	Ana					2	2
Lucie Guest	Zoie			1	1		2
Natalie Krill	Patty			2			2
Melanie Nicholls-King	Amelia	2					2
Louise Nicol	Mrs. Chubbs	1	1				2
Jessica Salgueiro	Luisa			2			2
Elizabeth Saunders	Anita Bowers	2					2
Taylor Trowbridge	Tabitha Stewart				2		2
Allan Turner	Young Ethan Duncan		1	1			2
Ivan Wanis-Ruiz	Alonzo Martinez				2		2
Kirsten Williamson	Detective Lindstein				2		2
Azdin Zaman	Mr. Kumar	1		1			2

== Main characters ==
=== Project Leda clones ===
- Portrayed by Tatiana Maslany

Sarah Manning, Beth Childs, Katja Obinger, Alison Hendrix, Cosima Niehaus, Helena, Rachel Duncan, Jennifer Fitzsimmons, Antoinette "Tony" Sawicki, Krystal Goderitch, Veera "MK" Suominen and others, are all clones born in 1984 to various women by in vitro fertilisation. Their creation was referred to as Project Leda. The series focuses on Sarah Manning, a small-time con woman and orphan who is the only clone to have a biological daughter. (All clones were presumed to be sterile before Sarah was discovered, with one of the original scientists revealing that the clones, as 'prototypes', were all designed to be sterile, and it is also revealed in season 2 that Helena is also able to conceive given her origin as Sarah's specific twin.) Other clones include Elizabeth "Beth" Childs, a police detective whose suicide at the start of the series leads Sarah into the conspiracy; Alison Hendrix, a soccer mom who tries to be the perfect housewife, but suffers from pill and drink addiction as well as jumping to conclusions; Cosima Niehaus, a lesbian graduate student studying evolutionary developmental ("evo-devo") biology who researches the clones' biology; Helena, the twin sister of Sarah, a fanatic assassin trained by the Proletheans who has suffered severe abuse throughout her life; Rachel Duncan, an executive at the Dyad Institute, who was raised knowing that she is a clone from childhood. Maslany also voiced the scorpion, called Pupok, that speaks to Helena in her hallucinations in Season 3.

=== Paul Dierden ===
- Portrayed by Dylan Bruce

Paul Dierden is an ex-military mercenary, who was blackmailed into being Beth's monitor under the guise of being her boyfriend. Following the discovery of Beth's death and Sarah's impersonation of her, he chooses to continue trying to protect Sarah, calling it his job. The two continue a sexual relationship. However Dyad still holds his past over him and makes him Rachel's new monitor, with Rachel forcing him into a sexual relationship with her. In the season 2 finale it is revealed he is still in the military and was a double agent from Project Castor spying on Dyad and Project Leda. Paul checks on Rudy and Seth's cognitive functions and orders them to return to the military base. He also warns Cal that Sarah needs to stop investigating Castor for her own safety. Paul begins to investigate Dr. Coady at the military compound, and he finds that she has been illegally sterilizing common women with the contagious Castor disease in order to collect data and potentially produce a deadly biological weapon. Paul helps Sarah escape the military compound, and he confesses that, even though he never loved Beth, his love for Sarah was genuine. During their escape, Miller stabs Paul several times to stop him from fleeing. Paul breaks Miller's neck and then sends Sarah away on her own in an attempt to destroy Coady's research in order to prevent the development of the weaponry. When Coady and Rudy rush to retrieve Coady's scientific work, they confront Paul who is attempting to stop the two from reclaiming Coady's unethical scientific data. Coady shoots Paul multiple times in the chest who then releases a grenade while he is dying. Rudy reacts quickly to the danger, allowing him and Coady a few extra seconds of escape before Paul's grenade detonates. (seasons 1–4)

=== Felix "Fee" Dawkins ===
- Portrayed by Jordan Gavaris

Felix "Fee" Dawkins is Sarah's gay foster brother and confidant; when none of her sisters are available, he acts as Sarah's backup. During childhood, they were quite close, but she often abused him for amusement; they are still close as adults. He identifies as a modern artist, but moonlights as a prostitute. He is the first person Sarah confides in about the existence of clones, and has developed his own friendship with Alison in particular while helping her cope with the stress of her existence as a clone. During Seasons 2 and 3, Cosima stays with him, due to her declining health.

=== Detective Arthur "Art" Bell ===
- Portrayed by Kevin Hanchard

Detective Arthur "Art" Bell is Beth's police partner. He cares for Beth and tries to guide her through tough times even when she is dead as he unknowingly is helping Sarah as Beth. After he learns of Beth's stolen identity and death he decides to side with the clones over the police department, carrying out off-the-books research for them. In Season 3, Sarah figures out that Art was in love with Beth, but wasn't able to bring himself to tell her. It turns out Art was close enough to Beth that she called him for help prior to her suicide to explain about the clones; however, Art dismissed the call, believing Beth was high on her prescription drugs.

=== Victor "Vic" Schmidt ===
- Portrayed by Michael Mando

Sarah's abusive, drug-dealing ex-boyfriend. Vic is something of a nosy idiot, as he cannot accept facts when told to his face (such as Sarah hating him and never wanting him around) and investigates anything suspicious. After being tricked by Felix into thinking Beth's corpse was Sarah, Vic grieves; however, he later meets Alison, thinking she's Sarah. He invites himself to Alison's potluck, thinking Sarah is pulling a scam; however, Paul manages to scare him off. He becomes a police informant for Angie and under her orders he befriends Alison at rehab; Angie would erase his criminal record in exchange. He is later intimidated by Donnie to stay away from the Hendrix family. (regular season 1; recurring season 2)

=== Siobhan Sadler ===
- Portrayed by Maria Doyle Kennedy

Also known as "Mrs. S," Siobhan Sadler is Sarah's and Felix's Irish foster mother. She fell in love with and married John Sadler at a young age, befriending his group of freedom fighters – the Birdwatchers. After John was murdered in a fight with her mother back in '78, Siobhan started a new relationship with Carlton. She acts as guardian to Sarah's daughter Kira while Sarah is away. She is shown to be intelligent and resourceful, hiding Sarah for years and protecting her and Kira. Mrs. S used her network to hide Ethan Duncan and find Sarah as a child, claiming to have protected her from Dyad Sarah's whole life. Mrs. S makes a deal with Paul and the military to work with them and abduct Helena in exchange for a way to help Sarah and Kira. She eventually is forgiven by both sisters and is stunned as everyone else to learn that the genetic original for both clone lines is her mother Kendall Malone. Biologically speaking, Siobhan is Sarah's niece and that would make Kira her cousin. Siobhan later has her mother sent to Iceland, where Cal and Kira are hiding out. After Kendall is murdered by Marty Duko, a vengeful Siobhan eventually kills him. In the final stages of the clones' war with Neolution, Siobhan persuades Rachel to double-cross her lover Ferdinand, leading to a confrontation in which Siobhan and Ferdinand kill each other.

=== Dr. Delphine Cormier ===
- Portrayed by Evelyne Brochu

Dr. Delphine Cormier is Cosima's monitor, girlfriend, and fellow scientist. She is torn between her job at Dyad and her love for Cosima. After finding out about Cosima's illness she works with her in the Dyad to try to find a cure. She is promoted to the public leader of Dyad after Leekie's death and unintentionally helps Rachel kidnap Kira. Rachel then bans her from working with clones and tries to send her away to Frankfurt. However, Marion promotes Delphine to take over Rachel's position and Delphine enacts her revenge on Rachel. Delphine returns to Dyad, supposedly after learning that Sarah was kidnapped and has been missing for five days, but it is later revealed that her jealousy has led her to spy on Cosima and Shay's relationship, photographing and videotaping the two on their various dates. Delphine interrogates Shay, believing her to be the Castor mole. She is about to begin cutting Shay when Cosima calls to inform her that Gracie admitted to being the Castor mole. Delphine finds out that Dr. Nealon replaced Rachel with an induced Krystal and sent her to Vienna. She confronts him in an enclosed room, and he reveals that Rachel now belongs to Neolution, the group that he has been working for all along, attempting to procure the Leda and Castor original genomes for scientific advancement. Delphine calls for the guards to take Nealon away, but she receives no responses, and Dr. Nealon suddenly attacks her as he bleeds from the mouth. He leans over her, spilling blood onto her face, as a regurgitated worm spills from his mouth. Delphine shoots Nealon before the worm can reach her. As he dies, he proclaims that Delphine will be dead before morning. Delphine confronts Shay to apologize and tells her that she is giving Cosima permission to reveal everything to Shay, stating that the two are right for each other. She then visits Cosima at Bubbles, discreetly saying goodbye to Cosima and the other Leda clones. Delphine parks her car in a parking garage and is followed by an unseen pursuer. Delphine asks "what will happen to [Cosima]?" and receives no response; instead, the pursuer shoots Delphine, whose death is implied but not seen. Krystal confirms in season 4 that Delphine was picked up, alive, by after being shot. She has been on the Island in the north this whole time after being spared by P.T. Westmorland, she reunites with a hypothermic Cosima, and then proceeds to undress to share body warmth with her in the patient bed located inside of one of the houses on the Island. (recurring seasons 1 & 4–5; regular seasons 2–3)

=== Project Castor clones ===
- Portrayed by Ari Millen

A number of male clones (see here) were created as the result of Project Castor, a sister project to Project Leda and a top-secret military program. Unlike their Leda counterparts, the Castor clones have always been aware of what they are, being raised together by the US military; their caretaker was Virginia Coady, who they refer to as Mother. They suffer a mental defect, which basically turns their brains to, quoting Scotty, "Swiss cheese" after set amount of time; unfortunately the defect is also an STD, which sterilizes women. Coady studies this, often sending Rudy off on leave to infect new test subjects. The first Castor clone to be introduced to the viewers is Mark Rollins, coming off as a homicidal Prolethean, before being exposed as an undercover Castor agent; he marries fellow Prolethean Gracie Johanssen after running away from the Prolethean farm, wanting a normal life with her before his defect kills him. Other major Castor clones includes the menacing scar-faced Rudy, the tormented Seth, the crippled Miller and the Neolutionist Ira. All the Castor clones are now deceased, with Mark, the last, executed by Coady. (recurring season 2; regular season 3–5)

=== Donnie Hendrix ===
- Portrayed by Kristian Bruun

Donnie Hendrix (né Chubbs) is husband to Alison Hendrix. He was once Alison's monitor, working for Dyad. His and Alison's marriage was strained for a long time, especially after Alison cornered him and tortured him to find out if he was a monitor or not. He lied, and they reconciled. However, she then found out the truth: that he really was a monitor but was unaware of his true purpose and that Alison was a clone. He then cornered his boss, Dr. Leekie, in his car and killed him with an accidental pistol shot to the head. He fled back to Alison, begging her to help him do away with the body. They buried Leekie under their garage. This "bonding" helped to jump-start their relationship, giving it newfound passion, trust, and happiness. In season 3, he got fired after telling his boss Susan Teller that she was a bitch, something he found "frickin' glorious". He and Alison later briefly sold drugs for Pouchie, and got the Hendrix family soap store Bubbles from Ali's mother. Helena comes to live with them, and Donnie comes to see that she means well; he even helps find her boyfriend as a "thank you" present. After Pouchie's niece threatens Oscar and Gemma, Donnie is left with all the drug lords' money after Helena murders them to protect the children. (recurring seasons 1–2; regular season 3–5)

=== Scott Smith ===
- Portrayed by Josh Vokey

Scott Smith is a fellow student and friend of Cosima at the University of Minnesota, who helps with her research and later joins her and Delphine at the Dyad Institute. Always helping Cosima however he can, he becomes the only scientist of Dyad that the clones consistently trust. (recurring seasons 1–3; regular season 4–5)

== Recurring characters ==
=== Acquaintances of Sarah, Felix and Mrs. S ===
==== Kira Manning ====
- Portrayed by Skyler Wexler

Kira Manning (Tag #615C33) is Sarah's biological, naturally conceived, daughter. The only child of a clone, she has inherited the apparent accelerated healing ability demonstrated by Sarah and Helena, and has shown the ability to tell the clones apart even when they are posing as each other. It would seem that her intelligence is greater than a normal child's, being able to figure out Cal is her father within moments of meeting him, and that he needed a distraction to get rid of a suspicious cop. She also seems to have some of Sarah's skills as she was able to steal a nurse's phone during an examination without her notice and use it to call Cal. After Rudy threatens Kira, Sarah sends Kira to Iceland with her father Cal; they reunite in the third-season finale. In season four, Kira seems to have developed a latent psychic ability: She dreamed about her "aunts" killing Sarah because she was "changing". (seasons 1–5)

==== Bobby ====
- Portrayed by Diana Salvatore

Bobby is the owner of a bar that Sarah and Felix frequent. Cosima visits her bar for a date with Shay. (seasons 1–3)

==== Sherry and Rockabilly Bob ====
- Portrayed by Jamila Fleming and Marqus Bobesich

Sarah's friends, who attended her staged funeral. (season 1)

==== Colin ====
- Portrayed by Nicholas Rose

A morgue attendant, and sometimes lover of Felix. A night of romance between them was ruined by Paul under Rachel's orders. He returns in Season 5 to see Felix's art gallery, keeping the secret that Felix's sisters bit is more than performance art of one woman. (seasons 1–2 & 5)

==== Teddy ====
- Portrayed by Earl "Bubba" McLean

One of Felix's recurring clients. (seasons 1–2)

==== Amelia ====
- Portrayed by Melanie Nicholls-King

Sarah and Helena's surrogate birth mother. Helena, while still mentally unstable, stabs Amelia in revenge for the torture the Proletheans put her through because Amelia sent her to a church orphanage. She dies, telling Sarah that Siobhan knows about the Duncans. (season 1)

==== Benjamin Kertland ====
- Portrayed by Julian Richings

One of Mrs. S's most trusted allies who has no association with the Dyad Institute or the Proletheans. Most of his past history with Mrs. S is unknown, but he has been referred to as a "Birdwatcher", a term used to describe the network of individuals who helped shelter Mrs. S, Sarah, and Felix after they fled Brixton. (seasons 2 & 4)

==== Cal Morrison ====
- Portrayed by Michiel Huisman

One of Sarah's past con-victims and Kira's father; Sarah later told Cal it was hard to go through with the con as she was happy being with him. He used to make weapons for the military and became wealthy as a war profiteer. Within the short time he meets Kira, Cal becomes determined to be a good father to her. At the start season 3, he takes Kira to Iceland to protect her from Neolution. (seasons 2–3)

==== La Camerera ====
- Portrayed by Michelle Arvizu

The owner of a restaurant bar in Mexico that Sarah and Helena utilize as a rendezvous to reconnect with Mrs. S after their escape from the Castor compound. (season 3)

==== Kendall Malone ====
- Portrayed by Alison Steadman

Mrs. S's mother and genetic original to both the Castor and Leda clones. She absorbed her male twin in the womb and possesses her female DNA as well as her brother's male DNA. When she was an inmate in prison in the 1980s, Ethan Duncan ran tests on the inmates for supposed cancer research, and he found Kendall's DNA to be suitable for his cloning project. Five years later, Duncan returned to her out of grief to confess his true motivations for harvesting her DNA. He divulged his utilization of her DNA in order to produce a line of clones, and informed her of a female clone that had been lost in the foster system – Sarah Manning. Kendall managed to bring Siobhan and Sarah together due to her being a "regretful mother", in order to give Siobhan a piece of herself that is better than the person she turned out to be. Kendall and Siobhan eventually drifted apart but were brought back together in season 3, resulting in Kendall's part in Projects Leda and Castor being revealed to the Clone Club. Not long thereafter Kendall was captured and killed on the orders of Evie Cho and her corpse was incinerated. (seasons 3–4)

==== Adele ====
- Portrayed by Lauren Hammersley

Felix's Southern biological half-sister and disbarred lawyer with a drinking problem. Geneconnexion, the program Felix used to find Adele, is connected to Evie Cho's BrightBorn Corporation and Neolution. (seasons 4–5)

=== Acquaintances of Beth and Art ===
==== Detective Angela "Angie" Deangelis ====
- Portrayed by Inga Cadranel

Art's new partner, trying to uncover the clone conspiracy behind Art's back. After Donnie threatens her, she backs off, never to bother the clones again; he even notes Angie is dense as she can't figure out the identical women as clones.(seasons 1–2 & 4)

==== Lieutenant Gavin Hardcastle ====
- Portrayed by Ron Lea

Commanding officer of Beth, Art and Angie. (seasons 1, 4 & 5). (Referenced as "Mike" in episode 4.01.)

==== Dr. Anita Bower ====
- Portrayed by Elizabeth Saunders

Beth's psychiatrist who prescribed her conflicting drugs and later questions Sarah-as-Beth in regards to Beth's shooting of Maggie Chen. Sarah is able to force Dr. Bower to list her able to be on active duty by threatening to reveal the drugs and thereby implicate her. (season 1)

==== Janis Beckwith ====
- Portrayed by Jean Yoon

Coroner and co-worker of Beth, Art, and Angie. (seasons 1 & 4)

==== Raj Singh ====
- Portrayed by Raymond Ablack

A police technician smitten with Beth. (seasons 1 & 4)

==== Detective Martin "Marty" Duko ====
- Portrayed by Gord Rand

A detective at Beth's and Art's precinct, representing the police union in the investigation of her shooting of Maggie Chen; he is also associated with Neolution. (season 4)

==== Detective Lindstein and Troy Collier ====
- Portrayed by Kirsten Williamson and Joe Pingue

Officers at Beth and Art's precinct, investigating the three murders that Helena committed at Pouchy's garage, as well as the Hendrixes' dealing of narcotics out of Bubbles. Troy is revealed to be an agent of Evie Cho and feeds her information from his various police investigations. (season 4)

==== Detective Maddie Engers ====
- Portrayed by Elyse Levesque

A Neolution plant instructed by Rachel to investigate and pressure the Hendrixes, threatening Art's daughter to make him comply in helping her. Present for the final battle in Dyad, Art has his revenge by knocking her out. (season 5)

=== Acquaintances of Alison and Donnie ===
==== Oscar and Gemma Hendrix ====
- Portrayed by Drew Davis (seasons 1–2 & 4) and Millie Davis (seasons 1–5)

Alison's and Donnie's adopted children. As of Season 3, they are aware of the clones, but think they are simply Alison's sisters. Gemma has a knack for showing up at awkward moments, such as when Sarah (dressed as Alison) was trying to keep Paul from killing Vic, when her parents were burying Dr. Leekie's body, and when Alison and Donnie were having some time to themselves.

==== Aynsley Norris ====
- Portrayed by Natalie Lisinska

Alison's nosy neighbor and best friend. Believing Aynsley was her monitor, Alison slept with Chad; this ruined their friendship. Aynsley accidentally dies when her scarf catches in the food disposal; Alison didn't shut it off, leaving to question if it counts as murder or accident. (seasons 1–2, 5)

==== Charity Simms ====
- Portrayed by Kristi Angus

Neighbor of Alison and Aynsley. (seasons 1–2)

==== Meera Kumar ====
- Portrayed by Priya Rao

Neighbor of Alison and Aynsley. (seasons 1–2 & 5)

==== Mr. Kumar ====
- Portrayed by Azdin Zaman

Meera's husband. (seasons 1 & 3)

==== Chad Norris ====
- Portrayed by Eric Johnson

Aynsley's promiscuous husband. He divorces Aynsley as their marriage is nothing more than a sham held together for the sake of their kids. He initially intended to give Aynsley full custody, while he got the dog, but her death forces him to take in his kids. (seasons 1 & 5)

==== Mrs. Chubbs ====
- Portrayed by Louise Nicol

Donnie's mother. (seasons 1–2)

==== Reverend Mike ====
- Portrayed by Ryan Blakely

The Hendrix' clergyman. Felix found him attractive. (seasons 1–2 & 4)

==== "Pouchy" Pouzihno ====
- Portrayed by Tony Cianchino

Jason Kellerman's boss and drug supplier. He previously supervised Vic's deals and cut off his finger for withholding payment. When Donnie accidentally gives him the wrong envelope during a drug deal, Pouchy reacted most unreasonably by holding him hostage and nearly ruining Alison's chance to make a speech during the election for school trustee (as his niece wasted Alison's time to count the money when she went to get it). He and his gang are killed by Helena after threatening Alison's kids, and all his money ended up with the Hendrixes. (seasons 1 & 3)

==== João ====
- Portrayed by David Vena

One of Pouchy's bodyguards and enforcers. (seasons 1 & 3)

==== Ramone ====
- Portrayed by Alex Ozerov

Alison's drug and weapons dealer who assists Sarah in her initial confrontation with Rachel and later sells his drug supply to the Hendrixes. (seasons 2–5)

==== Sarah Stubbs ====
- Portrayed by Terra Hazelton

Alison's co-star in the community theatre production of the musical "Blood Ties." She is the only person to show friendship or support to Alison after the scandal in season 1. (seasons 2–4)

==== Alexander ====
- Portrayed by Alex Karzis

The director of "Blood Ties". He appears lecherous as he touches Alison inappropriately numerous times. (season 2)

==== Paul and Conrad ====
- Portrayed by Carter Hayden and Kent Sheridan

The supporting cast of "Blood Ties". (season 2)

==== Kelsey ====
- Portrayed by Barbara Johnston

Supporting cast for Blood Ties in season 2 and choreographer for Jesus Christ Superstar in season 4. (seasons 2 & 4)

==== Anika Johnson ====
- Portrayed by Anika Johnson

The pianist of Blood Ties and the vocal coach for Jesus Christ Superstar. (seasons 2 & 4) The actress Johnson is also the co-creator of Blood Ties, which exists in real life.

==== Yvonne ====
- Portrayed by Raven Dauda

Alison's therapist at the rehabilitation center. She is quite blunt and rude, believing Alison is no different from the other addicts. (season 2)

==== Marci Coates ====
- Portrayed by Amanda Brugel

A woman against whom Alison runs in the Bailey Downes's school trustee election. It seems many people dislike her, as Marci has been manipulating real estate prices for houses to gain votes. (season 3)

==== Vera ====
- Portrayed by Trenna Keating

A soccer mom who buys drugs from Alison and Donnie in exchange for her loyalty to Alison in the school trustee election. (season 3)

==== Lionel ====
- Portrayed by Gavin Fox

One of Pouchy's agents who works to recover drugs from defaulted dealers. (season 3)

==== Jason Kellerman ====
- Portrayed by Justin Chatwin

Alison's ex-boyfriend from high school and now hers and Donnie's new boss and supplier in the drug trade. (season 3)

==== Luisa ====
- Portrayed by Jessica Salgueiro

Pouchy's niece who works as Pouchy's English-to-Portuguese translator. She and Pouchy are likely murdered by Helena, who was covered in a lot of blood, after they threatened the Hendrixes' children. (season 3)

=== Acquaintances of Cosima and Scott ===
==== Painmaker ====
- Portrayed by Allen Keng

One of Scott's friends whom Cosima meets through the Runewars parties that are frequently held in her lab at the Dyad. (seasons 2–3)

==== Shay Davydov ====
- Portrayed by Ksenia Solo

A holistic healer whom Cosima meets through a dating app called Sapphire; however, she later admits to being a simple RMT. When the two first meet in Bobby's bar, an unknown person takes photographs of the two from a distance. This person is revealed to be Delphine, who is shown to have countless photographs and video footage of the two meeting for the first time. Shay quickly becomes intimate with Cosima only to break up with her after Delphine threatens her, believing she is a mole for Project Castor. Once this is disproved, Delphine apologizes and encourages her to give Cosima another chance, even letting her have permission to learn about the clones. (season 3)

==== Hell-Wizard ====
- Portrayed by Calwyn Shurgold

One of Scott's friends who plays Runewars in Cosima's lab and later allows the pair to utilize the basement space of his comic shop as a makeshift lab setting after the two get locked out of Dyad. (seasons 3–5)

=== Acquaintances of Helena ===
==== Jesse ====
- Portrayed by Patrick J. Adams

A man who Helena meets in a bar in Cold River. The two quickly develop an intimate relationship which is later interrupted by Helena's arrest. The two reconnect after Alison and Donnie arrange for the two to meet at their home. He has a similar mindset to Helena, although more stable. Helena has settled on Jesse as her boyfriend, wanting a life with him. (seasons 2–3)

==== Sister Irina ====
- Portrayed by Eileen Sword

A nun who protected Helena in Ukraine and later sheltered Helena, Sarah, and Mrs. S from Rachel and Neolution. (season 5)

=== Acquaintance of Krystal ===
==== Zoie ====
- Portrayed by Lucie Guest

Krystal's co-worker and confidant. (seasons 3–4)

=== Acquaintances of M.K. ===
==== Dizzy ====
- Portrayed by Joel Thomas Hynes

A hacker friend of M.K. He sees Sarah in Club Neolution and mistakes her for M.K. (season 4)

=== Project Leda (including The Dyad Institute, Topside, BrightBorn and Revival) ===
==== Olivier Duval ====
- Portrayed by David Richmond-Peck

Paul's handler within the Dyad Institute. He blamed Sarah (posing as Beth) for the deaths of the other Leda clones, even when she told him that Helena was responsible; he learned the truth the hard way. Dr. Leekie later has him poisoned for failure. (seasons 1 & 4)

==== Aldous Leekie ====
- Portrayed by Matt Frewer

Frontman of the Dyad Institute and the face of the Neolution movement. It's suggested Delphine was his lover. He is accidentally killed by Donnie, and buried under the Hendrix's garage; his head was later dug up for the mod worm. (seasons 1–2, 4 & 5)

==== Astrid ====
- Portrayed by Sarain Boylan

Olivier's lieutenant who often runs Club Neolution, a music club for civilians attracted to the Neolution movement. Astrid assists Olivier with problems relating to Paul's reluctance as a monitor. (seasons 1 & 4)

==== Daniel Rosen ====
- Portrayed by Matthew Bennett

A Dyad associated lawyer, assigned to do Rachel's shady work – or as Sarah calls him "Rachel's bloody doberman." He had a sexual relationship with Rachel and also acted as her monitor with her knowledge. Helena kills him to save Sarah. (seasons 1–2)

==== Young Rachel Duncan ====
- Portrayed by Cynthia Galan

Seen in the home videos from Rachel's childhood (season 2); and as Charlotte Bowles, the last living clone of the 400 attempts that were made to perpetuate Project Leda. (seasons 2–5)

==== Young Susan Duncan ====
- Portrayed by Christy Bruce

Rachel's adoptive mother and one of the scientists behind Project Leda. Thought to have been killed years prior to the series. Her young self only appears in video footage from Rachel's childhood. (seasons 2–3)

==== Ethan Duncan ====
- Portrayed by Andrew Gillies

Alias Andrew Peckham, Rachel's adoptive father and the other Leda scientist. Living off-grid since his wife's alleged death. Commits suicide in front of Rachel to prevent Dyad from getting the science to make more clones. As shown through Season 3, Rachel is still the little girl he cared for deep inside; his death actually causes her to cry at times.(seasons 2–3)

==== Marion Bowles ====
- Portrayed by Michelle Forbes

A high-ranking official within Topside – a group controlling Dyad – who outranks both Leekie and Rachel. She contacts Cal and Mrs. S to free Sarah and Kira from Dyad. It is revealed she is raising the youngest Leda clone, Charlotte, and is battling the military and their male clones of Project Castor, holding one of the male clones in her home. Her fate became unknown when Charlotte moved to the care of Susan Duncan but M.K. marked her as deceased on her Topside Chart in episode 4.04. (season 2)

==== Martin Funt ====
- Portrayed by Danny MacDonald

Assigned to assist/guard Ethan Duncan while he was being held at the Dyad institute. (season 2)

==== Alan Nealon ====
- Portrayed by Tom McCamus

A doctor who examined Sarah in her sleep when she was impersonating Beth. He is a high-ranking Dyad official who processes and interrogates Sarah after she surrenders and he then arranges her oophorectomy. After Rachel's trauma, he works to reconstruct her memories from before her brain injury. He is still loyal to Rachel even after Delphine is promoted and helps her con everyone to escape. He is revealed to be possessing a hidden agenda: attempting to acquire the original Leda and Castor genomes for Neolution. Delphine shoots him after he attacks her and attempts to regurgitate a bloody worm into her mouth, supposedly one of his adaptations from Neolution. As he dies, he warns Delphine that she will be dead before morning. (seasons 2–3)

==== Young Ethan Duncan ====
- Portrayed by Allan Turner

A younger version of Ethan Duncan who is seen in Rachel's childhood home videos. (seasons 2–3)

==== Ferdinand Chevalier ====
- Portrayed by James Frain

A Topside official who is conspiring with Rachel to eliminate the Leda clones; he was also in a sexual relationship with her and seemed to harbour some affection towards her as he flew into a rage at hearing that Neolution had taken her. After learning of the Neolutionists' manipulations he sides with Sarah and her allies. He hates Neolutionists, stating "They're like ticks! You never know when you have one on you." Rachel later manages to contact him, getting Ferdinand back on her side, despite his hatred of Neolution. (seasons 3–5)

==== Bulldog ====
- Portrayed by Earl Pastko

Ferdinand's right-hand man and bodyguard. He is revealed to be a Neolutionist mole and is then killed by Ferdinand via sulfuric acid. (season 3)

==== Susan Duncan ====
- Portrayed by Rosemary Dunsmore

Rachel Duncan's mother, who was believed to be dead. She is revealed to be alive in the season three finale when she confronts a recovering Rachel, whom she is caring for in her home; Kendall explains that Ethan told her that Neolution corrupted Susan's morals. She is connected to Neolution and arranged with Dr. Nealon for Rachel to be transferred to her personal care. (seasons 3–5)

==== Evie Cho ====
- Portrayed by Jessalyn Wanlim

A woman previously working under Dr. Leekie at the Dyad Institute. She is the CEO of the BrightBorn corporation, a Neolution-driven fertility company. (season 4)

==== Frank and Roxie ====
- Portrayed by Ian Matthews and Miranda Edwards

Neolution agents mainly answering to Evie Cho. M.K. sees them burying a body from which a cheek worm had been removed. Beth interrupts them as they remove a worm from Aaron, whose disappearance she is investigating. Later they attempt to grab M.K., but catch Sarah instead (and let her go). When Cosima investigates BrightBorn, Roxie is sent to catch her. Roxie later hunts the escaped BrightBorn surrogates, likely killing one and making it look like a suicide, she is arrested by Art. Meanwhile, Frank tries to kill Alison with a Maggot-Bot but he is killed by Helena. (season 4)

==== Henry Bosch ====
- Portrayed by Dmitry Chepovetsky

Leading physician at BrightBorn, interviewing applicants to their maternity program. (season 4)

==== Ian Van Lier ====
- Portrayed by Scott Wentworth

Evie Cho's doctor and confidant at BrightBorn. Also one of Westmorland's backers, aware that he is a fraud. His body washes up from a river when Westmorland's backers are to be killed. (seasons 4–5)

==== "The Messenger" ====
- Portrayed by Géza Kovács

A man that Rachel sees in visions through her implanted eye. (seasons 4–5)

==== Percival "P.T." Westmorland / John Paterick Mathieson ====
- Portrayed by Stephen McHattie

The supposedly 170 year old founder of Neolution and founder of the clone projects. He lives on a northern island with a village of followers called Revival, dedicated to the study of extending human life. He is revealed to be a fraudster named John Mathieson that met Susan Duncan in Cambridge as a rich young man, and is afraid to die. Forcing Helena's twins to come early in attempt to use their genes on himself, he is killed by Sarah, who crushes his skull using his own oxygen tank. (Season 5)

==== Simon Frontenac ====
- Portrayed by Andrew Moodie

Rachel's new assistant after she works with Westmorland, carrying out her requests like rounding up Sarah's family and interrogating the Hendrixes about Helena's whereabouts. He reports on her to Westmorland like a monitor, making Rachel realize she could never be free. Loyal to Neolution to the end he is killed by Art. (season 5)

==== Mud ====
- Portrayed by Jenessa Grant

A resident of Revival and devout believer in P.T. Westmorland. (season 5)

==== The Creature / Yanis ====
- Portrayed by Andrew Musselman

A feral man living in the woods on the island, scaring the residents of Revival. He was Westmorland's first experiment, a Latvian orphan with a healing factor pushed too far by Westmorland and Coady. Susan put his healing factor into the clones but it failed, though unexpectedly passed on to Kira. Westmorland shoots him dead in front of Cosima. (season 5)

==== Aisha Yasin ====
- Portrayed by Sirena Gulamgaus

A young girl with cancer whom P.T. Westmorland promised to cure. (season 5)

==== Aisha's mother ====
- Portrayed by Homa Kameh

(season 5)

==== Hashem Al-Khatib ====
- Portrayed by Elie Gemael

A member of Westmorland's board in charge of laundering millions of dollars for Neolution's purposes. He knew the truth about Westmorland and intends to proceed with their plans anyway. (season 5)

=== The Proletheans ===
==== Tomas ====
- Portrayed by Daniel Kash

Responsible for the kidnapping and training of Helena; as a result, she ended up "batshit crazy", but was later helped in becoming more mentally stable by her sisters. Believing that the LEDA clones are abominations, he has no respect for the fact they are living beings. He is later murdered by Henrik to gain control of Helena, for fertility experiments. (seasons 1-2 & 5)

==== Henrik "Hank" Johanssen ====
- Portrayed by Peter Outerbridge

A Prolethean leader, attempting to revalue their view on science and proliferate Helena's miraculous genes at the expense of everyone closest to him. Revealed to have been Ethan Duncan's lab assistant who produced a son, Abel, from the original Castor DNA. (season 2)

==== Bonnie Johanssen ====
- Portrayed by Kristin Booth

Henrik's devoted wife who travels to find more "breeding mares" for Henrik to artificially inseminate. She disowns Gracie because of her miscarriage of Henrik and Helena's baby, which wasn't her fault; Mark accidentally sterilized her. (seasons 2–3)

==== Grace Rollins (née Johanssen) ====
- Portrayed by Zoé de Grand'Maison

Henrik and Bonnie's teenage daughter who eventually rebels against the Prolethean way of life. After being artificially inseminated with Henrik and Helena's genetic offspring, she runs away from the Prolethean farm and marries Mark in an official ceremony. She suffers a miscarriage, and is disowned by her family; the reason for the miscarriage is due to Mark's genetic defect being an STD, which sterilizes women. Despite this, she still loves Mark and betrays the Leda clones in an effort to help the military cure the Castor clones. Reunited with Mark the two plan to spend as much time as they can together before he gets sick and dies although Gracie convinces Mark to help Sarah in the Season 3 finale. She returns in Season 5 intending to sell out Helena to Coady for Mark's cure but cannot go through with it. The Neolutionists find them anyway and Gracie is killed by Engers. (seasons 2–3 & 5)

==== Alexis McGann ====
- Portrayed by Kathryn Alexandre

A Prolethean midwife and preschool teacher who considers the Leda clones to be abominations; upon hearing her sister called this, Sarah retorts "If Helena's an abomination, I'm much worse" and Art warns her figuratively that Sarah would bite Alexis' head off next time. Art accidentally allows her to learn when Gracie fled as his radio reported the location of the Johanssen's stolen truck. (seasons 2–3) The actress, Kathryn Alexandre, is also Maslany's acting double when a scene requires more than one clone.

=== Project Castor and associated characters ===
==== Virginia Coady ====
- Portrayed by Kyra Harper

A doctor who is overseeing Helena at the military compound to which she was taken by Project Castor. She raised the Castor clones when they were boys. They refer to her as "mother", and she in turn sees them as her children, even keeping pictures of them in her office. She has been utilizing the contagious Castor disease in order to sterilize innocent civilian women (mainly prostitutes), collect data, and attempt to produce biological weapons for the military. Rudy loyally serves her in this task, being a mentally unstable "mama's boy". Paul confronts Coady so she shoots him. As he dies Paul releases a grenade, destroying her scientific research. She then pursues Sarah and Kendall for the original genome but is betrayed by Mark, resulting in her capture by Ferdinand. She is still alive in Season 5, hidden and drugged in a mental hospital by Susan Duncan. Loyal to Mathieson's cause, even killing her last son and Castor, Mark, under Mathieson's orders. Finally killed while trying to force Art to deliver Helena's twins; Helena stabs a metal rod into Coady's throat. (seasons 3 & 5)

==== Dr. Silva ====
- Portrayed by Carlos Gonzalez-Vio

A military doctor for Project Castor who is collecting data on Project Leda through the testing of Helena and also working to discover the original Castor gene sequence. (season 3)

==== Patty ====
- Portrayed by Natalie Krill

A woman assaulted by Castor clones Rudy and Seth. She is revealed to have contracted the same sexually transmitted disease as Gracie, which causes her eyes to appear red. She has a daughter, and seems to live with her mother. (season 3)

==== David Benchman ====
- Portrayed by Tom Barnett

A military informant in Arlington who transfers information from Paul to the military directors. He betrayals Paul to Rudy and Dr. Coady, getting him killed. He makes a deal with Dr. Coady after she learns he has a mole inside Project Leda. The mole is Gracie whom David reunites with Mark as a reward for her help. David meets with Dr. Coady again to send Rudy after Alison. (season 3)

=== Civilian Neolutionists ===
While the Neolution movement is most notable represented by the scientists and businesspersons connected to Projects Leda and Castor, the Neolution ideas and ideals are also shared by many civilians, hoping to improve their lives in one way or another using its methods and technique, ranging from body modification to medical treatment.

==== Trina ====
- Portrayed by Allie MacDonald

A woman at Club Neolution whose boyfriend is kidnapped by Frank and Roxie, body-mod Neolutionists who implanted and later removed a mod worm from his cheek. Beth investigates his abduction. She later mistakes Alison for Beth. And then Sarah for Beth. (season 4)

==== Alonzo Martinez ====
- Portrayed by Ivan Wanis-Ruiz

A man seen in a video shown to Sarah by Dizzy. He was a Neolutionist with a "Maggot-Bot" implant. Upon his attempt to have it removed, the fail-safe was triggered, and tentacles ejected from the Maggot-Bot, encapsulating his face and killing him. (season 4)

==== Tabitha Stewart ====
- Portrayed by Taylor Trowbridge

A woman assigned to BrightBorn's maternity program. She was eventually killed on Evie Cho's order, as a part of BrightBorn's plans to go public. (season 4)

=== Minor recurring cast ===
Additionally, real-life news anchor Janette Luu appeared as a reporter in the series' pilot episode as well as the fourth-season finale. Season one also included Dom Fiore as a police captain and Ivan Sherry as an agent of the Internal Affairs, both serving at Beth's precinct, as well as Joanne Reece as Beth's lawyer. In season two Allison Wilson-Forbes appeared as a trauma nurse caring for Helena, and in season three Monica Dottor portrayed as a soccer mom buying drugs from Alison. During season four Jonathan Purdon appeared as an associate of Benjamin Kertland, and Francisco Trujillo played the surgeon operating on Alonzo Martinez. While they all were credited for their roles, and appeared in two episodes each, their parts were very limited.

== Guest characters ==
=== Stephen Riggs ===
- Portrayed by Jean-Michel Le Gal

The manager of the bank at which Beth has a bank account. He accepts Sarah's bribe of sponsoring his charity run in exchange for expediting the withdrawal of Beth's $75,000 balance. (episode 1.01)

=== Madison ===
- Portrayed by Miriam McDonald

Paul's secretary at Trexcom Consulting. (episode 1.05)

=== Barry ===
- Portrayed by Rob deLeeuw

One of Mrs. S's birdwatchers who is later revealed to be connected with the Proletheans. (episode 2.02)

=== Carlton Redding ===
- Portrayed by Roger R. Cross

Another one of Mrs. S's birdwatchers. He was mentioned in episode 1.07 as the man who brought Sarah to Mrs. S. It is later revealed that he and Mrs. S had a romantic relationship which is temporarily rekindled. (episode 2.04)

=== Sammy ===
- Portrayed by Bishop Brigante

Tony's closest friend and likely monitor, who wishes to pass along a message to Beth Childs as he dies from a gun shot wound. It is revealed that, like Paul, he was a "ghost," a military mole infiltrating Leda. (episode 2.08)

=== Willard Finch ===
- Portrayed by Nicholas Campbell

An associate of Henrik's who is entrusted with the storage of important genetic samples. Gracie confronts Willard and asks for the samples that her father left in his possession. He gives her a locked box full of apparently useless files; Mark, likely due to his degenerating mind, wasn't able to deduce that they could hold valuable information. Mark tortures him in an attempt to recover the actual genetic samples, but Willard dies before he can divulge the information that Mark is seeking. (episode 3.03)

=== Jonah Appleyard ===
- Portrayed by David Fox

An elderly, blind, Prolethean who offers shelter to the Johanssen family following Henrik's death. (episode 3.04)

=== Connie Hendrix ===
- Portrayed by Sheila McCarthy

Alison's mother and the founder and owner of Bubbles, a soap store. She signs the store over to Alison, unknowingly helping Alison and Donnie continue their drug deals, and moves to Florida. She is conservative and constantly points out flaws in others, tending to babble a lot; she dislikes Donnie, who she keeps calling by his original last name "Chubbs". (episode 3.07)

=== Terrance ===
- Portrayed by Daniel Fathers

One of Mrs. S's old friends and contacts. (episode 3.09)

=== Kassov ===
- Portrayed by Nigel Bennett

Mrs. S's old connection who tracked down young Sarah Manning and moved her between safe houses. Felix and Sarah contact him in an attempt to find the Castor original. (episode 3.09)

=== Peaches ===
- Portrayed by herself

Seen singing the bar where Sarah has her bender. (episode 4.07)

=== A reporter ===
- Portrayed by George Stroumboulopoulos

A reporter interviewing Evie Cho. (episode 4.09)

=== Kendra Dupree ===
- Portrayed by Lisa Codrington

Another woman in BrightBorn's maternity program, her baby was born blind so they are both targets to be killed. Rachel is able to use her as a bargaining chip in her plan to overthrow Evie. (episode 4.09)

=== Mr. Mitchell ===
- Portrayed by Simu Liu

Kira's schoolteacher. (episode 5.02)

=== Brie ===
- Portrayed by Cara Ricketts

Krystal's girlfriend and beauty vlog partner whose hair begins falling out after using an experimental face cream she stole that turns out to be vital to Dyad's plan for Kira. (episode 5.06)

=== Len Snipp ===
- Portrayed by Tom Cullen

A source of Krystal's in the cosmetics world who recently sold his company to Dyad. When Krystal finds out that his company tested on animals, she rubs cream, which Brie stole that causes hair to fall out, all over his beard. Cullen was also Tatiana Maslany's partner for several years. (episode 5.06)

== Clones ==
By the end of the first season, 10 clones are revealed. They are of various nationalities and stations in life. Additional clones are revealed in the second season, including Jennifer, who died from the same respiratory illness that affected Katja and Cosima. In episode 8 of season 2, Tony, a transgender clone is introduced. In the season one finale, Cosima discovers each clone has a different DNA tag based on ASCII coded basepairs. In addition to the identification code is the text "THIS ORGANISM AND DERIVATIVE GENETIC MATERIAL IS RESTRICTED INTELLECTUAL PROPERTY" followed by a series of patent numbers. Sarah is given a photograph whose caption suggests that the cloning project that produced her was called "Project Leda". In the season 2 finale, Charlotte, an 8-year-old clone with a leg disability, is introduced. At the start of Season 3 a non-self-aware clone, Krystal, was almost kidnapped by the military. In Season 3 episode 8, a Polish clone is revealed to have recently died from the clone illness.

Season 2's finale reveals that the military carried on with a male cloning project called Project Castor, which created Mark (the Prolethean), Miller (the soldier clone), Rudy (a male clone held in the home of Marion Bowles), Seth (a mustachioed clone) and Parsons, a clone kept barely alive by the military to study the cognitive defect. All of the Project Castor clones are self-aware of their clone nature and were raised together in a military-like environment.

In the Season 3 premiere it is revealed in 2006 that Ferdinand of Topside was involved in the execution of six self-aware Project Leda clones in the Helsinki area. All were believed to be dead within 24 hours with another 32 people killed as collateral damage. Comics depicting the event would later clearly place it during 2001.

In the third episode of Season 3 it is revealed the originals for Projects Leda and Castor were brother and sister, making all the clones genetic siblings.

It is also revealed the DNA of the original Castor donor was stolen by Henrik Johanssen who wanted a son. This created Abel Johanssen who died as an infant.

The Castor and Leda original genetic source is revealed at the end of season three. It is Siobhan's mother, Kendall Malone, a genetic chimera who provided DNA for both the Leda and Castor lineages of clones, explaining the clones' relationship as genetic brother and sister.

In August 2015, at the conclusion of the Orphan Black comic book, a survivor of Helsinki was revealed: Veera Suominen. She starred in her comic series starting in November 2015 called Orphan Black: Helsinki and then appeared in Season 4 of the show in 2016.

In March 2016, the new Castor clone, Ira, was revealed on the website for the show.

The seventh episode of Season 5 mentions a Leda clone, Lisa Glynn, in Rachel's childhood flashback and reveals another, Miriam Johnson, in young adulthood. Miriam was a homeless artist sick with the Leda defect; Rachel arranged her death so research into the illness could progress. The ninth episode of the season shows an unnamed Leda clone praying in a church, the first one Helena killed.

The final episode of the series reveals there are 274 Leda clones in the world. Stephanie Loyd and Gillian West are mentioned directly while other names are seen briefly on a list. The final clone of the series is Camilla Torres, seen being cured by Delphine.
