= David Bohnett =

American philanthropist and technology entrepreneur

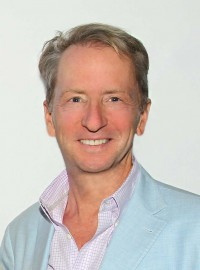
- Bohnett in 2011
- Born: April 2, 1956 (age 70); Chicago, Illinois, U.S.
- Education: University of Southern California (BS); University of Michigan (MBA)

David C. Bohnett (born April 2, 1956) is an American philanthropist and technology entrepreneur. He is the founder and chairman of the David Bohnett Foundation, a non-profit, grant-making organization devoted to improving society through social activism.

Bohnett founded the social networking site GeoCities in 1994; the highly successful site went public via an IPO in 1998, and was acquired by Yahoo in 1999. Since then he has invested in technology start-ups via Baroda Ventures, a Los Angeles–based venture capital firm he started in 1998.

== Early life, education, and early career ==
Bohnett was born in Chicago, Illinois in 1956, and grew up in Hinsdale, an affluent Chicago suburb, with Republican parents. His father was a business executive and his mother was a preschool teacher. His sister Wendy Bohnett Campbell is a past president of the board of the Dayton Philharmonic, and his brother William is a retired corporate attorney and was on the national board of the Smithsonian Institution from 2009 to 2018.

Bohnett was interested in business at an early age, selling Amway products and delivering newspapers. In high school he became fascinated by computers, and chose to attend college at the University of Southern California – where he received a BS in business administration – because it was one of the few universities at the time with a computer science program. He put himself through college by waiting tables, guiding tours at Universal Studios, and other service jobs.

In his youth, Bohnett experienced the isolation and pain of being gay, first in his conservative suburban hometown, and then in 1978 in college when his first lover, from a small-town Indiana Catholic family, committed suicide. Bohnett became active in gay rights at graduate school at the University of Michigan, beginning in the fall of 1978 as a hotline counselor at the Jim Toy–founded University of Michigan Lesbian and Gay Male Program Office, now called the Spectrum Center. As an openly gay MBA student, he volunteered to go to freshman psychology classes and, looking like an average Midwesterner, said to the students, "I'm gay, ask me anything." He received his MBA in finance from University of Michigan's Ross School of Business in 1980.

When he returned to Los Angeles after graduate school, he became involved with GLAAD and the Los Angeles Gay and Lesbian Center, came out to his parents, and in 1983 entered a longterm relationship with fellow activist and openly gay judge Rand Schrader, 11 years his senior. When Schrader died in the AIDS epidemic in 1993, Bohnett, like many surviving same-sex partners prior to marriage equality, was left with no legal spousal benefits and a significant estate tax bill. He did however receive $386,000 from Schrader's life insurance. Bohnett had been a staff information systems consultant at Arthur Andersen from 1980 to 1983 and, unable to be openly gay in that world, he had left to work at software companies instead. As his career in software was progressing, and shortly after Schrader's death, he searched for a way to tie together the software and activist sides of his life. Around this time the World Wide Web was just starting to be introduced, and he felt compelled to be a part of it.

== Internet career ==
=== GeoCities ===
In 1994 Bohnett's business and software expertise, and his interest in giving people a voice and a chance to meet people of similar interests, led him to develop GeoCities.com, with John Rezner as co-founder and chief technical officer. GeoCities was one of the first web hosting companies and one of the first social networking sites on the internet, an early forerunner of MySpace and Facebook. It allowed users to engage in a variety of innovative activities, such as creating their own free webpages, organized into communities of interest; connecting with others online; expressing their passions, creativity, and individuality; and engaging in e-commerce. The site grew very rapidly, receiving millions of users who set up webpages; at its peak it ultimately reached 38 million pages, created by individual users. GeoCities was the first large internet venture built on user-generated content, and in 2008 TechRadar cited it as #2 in its list of "20 websites that changed the world".

By 1997 it was the fifth most popular site on the internet, with over one million users. The company went public in 1998, nearly doubling its initial share price in its first day of trading; Bohnett used the increased funding to add various features including a search engine, numerous tools and templates which made page creation easy and which completely bypassed any need for HTML coding, and social tools which made it easy to interact. GeoCities also hosted business sites, sites for world news, and shopping sites. By December 1998 it was the third most visited internet site, and had 41 theme-based interest categories called "neighborhoods", whose topics ranged to areas as varied as fan fiction, fine dining, arts and literature, campus life, computers and technology, investing and finance, individual sports and recreational activities, education and philosophy, politics, family, kids' interests, chat and romance, the environment, travel, home life, cooking, health, fan pages, entertainment genres, women, and multiple international-interest pages. Yahoo! Inc. purchased GeoCities during the dotcom boom in 1999 for $3.57 billion, and Bohnett netted about $300 million.

=== Baroda Ventures ===
By 1998 Bohnett's success with GeoCities allowed him to begin investing in other technology companies, and he founded Baroda Ventures, a Los Angeles–based venture capital firm which makes early-stage investments in tech-related ventures. Baroda's investments focus mainly on consumer internet, e-commerce, mobile, SaaS, and digital media industries, with a particular interest in companies based in Los Angeles. Some of Baroda's investments have included SteelHouse, Retention Science, ID90T, Surf Air, DogVacay, and Gamesville.

Bohnett has become actively involved in many of Baroda's investment vehicles. These include NetZero, Stamps.com, Xdrive, LowerMyBills.com, Wireimage, OVGuide, FilmOn, and Online Partners (the parent company of Gay.com). In each of these he has maintained a significant investment stake, directorship, and active involvement with the entrepreneurs and management team. He has also been a board member of NCR Corporation.

== Philanthropic activities ==
=== David Bohnett Foundation ===
Immediately after selling his popular internet social-network company GeoCities to Yahoo! in 1999, Bohnett turned his attention to activism. He created the David Bohnett Foundation, "a nonprofit grant-making organization focused on providing resources for organizations pursuing societal change and social justice through activism", with an initial endowment of $32 million. According to the Los Angeles Times Magazine, he "invests where he can actually improve lives, empower individuals and build viable communities in meaningful ways". To serve as executive director and strategist for his foundation he hired Michael Fleming, who had been a media leader for the American Civil Liberties Union.

The David Bohnett Foundation is devoted to improving society through community-building and social activism, and it provides funding, state-of-the-art technology, and technical support to relevant innovative organizations and institutions. As of the end of 2025, the foundation had donated over $135 million. Its current primary funding areas are:

- The Fund for Los Angeles, which supports a broad spectrum of arts, educational, and civic programs in Los Angeles
- LGBT-related causes
- AIDS services and research
- Voting rights and voter registration
- Gun violence prevention
- Animal research and animal rights

The foundation also funds graduate-school civic internship and leadership programs at the John F. Kennedy School of Government at Harvard University (an LGBT-related program), the Gerald R. Ford School of Public Policy at the University of Michigan, the Robert F. Wagner Graduate School of Public Service at New York University, and the UCLA Luskin School of Public Affairs. In Detroit, New York City, and Los Angeles, the graduate students receive positions in the mayor's office, and their stipends and tuition are paid for by the Bohnett Foundation. These paid student interns have been involved in policy analysis and implementation, assisting speech writing, evaluating department heads, reducing homelessness, and other initiatives. Several former Bohnett mayoral fellows occupy management positions in the cities where they had interned, and in 2014 Stephanie Chang, a Bohnett fellow from the University of Michigan, became the first Asian-American woman elected to the Michigan state legislature.

In 2000, the foundation's first full year, it donated $2 million to LGBT organizations, AIDS services, gun control programs, and voter registration initiatives. Bohnett's initial grants included large donations to GLAAD, the Family Equality Council, and the Human Rights Campaign. A prime aim for Bohnett is to "create an environment which destigmatizes homosexuality", and to that end he has funded national gay rights organizations and local LGBT organizations and centers across the U.S. The nationwide LGBT centers he has funded and created include numerous LGBT CyberCenters – safe-haven internet cafes where LGBT young people and seniors, and disadvantaged, troubled, or closeted gays, can find support and resources, including computers and internet access. Bohnett created the first CyberCenter in 1998, and as of 2014 there were over 60 David Bohnett CyberCenters in the U.S., including locations in Atlanta, Tulsa, Orlando, Salt Lake City, Dallas, Tucson, Seattle, San Francisco, and New York City. Since 2004 each CyberCenter has been updated every three to four years. Bohnett's total non-political LGBT giving from 1999 through mid 2014 was $17 million. In 2018 the Bohnett Foundation, along with the Gill Foundation, partnered with the Biden Foundation and the YMCA of the US in a combined initiative, planned for three years, to improve the levels of inclusiveness and respect shown at YMCA locations around the nation towards LGBTQ individuals.

=== Additional philanthropy and directorships ===
Bohnett was a founding member of the Los Angeles chapter of the Gay and Lesbian Alliance Against Defamation (GLAAD). He focused its strategy on lobbying entertainment and media companies to produce positive representations of gays. His motivation in supporting positive media portrayals was in part to help people feel more comfortable about coming out.

Bohnett has been a trustee of amfAR (The Foundation for AIDS Research) since 2006, and was honored with an amfAR Award of Courage in 2006. He donated $1 million to amfAR's 2014/2015 Countdown for a Cure drive for an end to AIDS by 2020.

In addition to his personal and foundation philanthropy, Bohnett was the chairman of the Los Angeles Philharmonic Association from 2008 to 2013, and he was instrumental in recruiting Gustavo Dudamel to become the orchestra's music director. He was vice chairman of the LA Phil from 2013 to late 2015, and is currently on the orchestra's board of directors. His enthusiasm for involvement with the LA Phil was sparked by the opening of the Walt Disney Concert Hall in 2003, and he began major donations, totaling $3.5 million by July 2014, which helped the orchestra reach underserved communities and broaden and diversify its programming and activities. His chairmanship of the LA Phil brought music education, musical resources, and free instruments to LA's least-privileged areas. He has been a champion of the LA Phil's Youth Orchestra Los Angeles (YOLA) since its inception. In December 2014, Bohnett donated $20 million to the LA Philharmonic. $10 million of that endowed the David C. Bohnett Presidential Chair, ensuring that the orchestra will always have the funds to recruit and pay a first-rate president and chief executive officer. The other $10 million created the David C. Bohnett Presidential Fund for Discovery and Innovation, to make the LA Phil a "model" 21st-century orchestra through innovative programming; new audience development, including via digital routes; and social responsibility. In 2015, the Bohnett bequest co-funded a first-of-its-kind virtual reality (VR) mobile four-minute concert performance of Beethoven's Fifth Symphony, housed in a van and featuring an immersive experience of Dudamel conducting the symphony, which toured for two months to communities and young people who do not usually come to the Walt Disney Concert Hall; the VAN Beethoven experience was also made available as a free app called Orchestra VR in the Oculus Rift and Samsung VR app stores.

He is a trustee of the Los Angeles County Museum of Art (LACMA), and made a major gift to LACMA to name its Ahmanson Building atrium the David Bohnett Foundation Atrium. From 2001 through 2014, the Bohnett Foundation donated $8.8 million to LACMA. He is the former board chairman (2015–2017), and the current chairman of the executive committee, of the Wallis Annenberg Center for the Performing Arts. In 2012 he was appointed by President Barack Obama as a trustee of the John F. Kennedy Center for the Performing Arts, and President Joe Biden reappointed him as a trustee of the Kennedy Center in 2022. In 2015 the David Bohnett Foundation donated $5 million to the Kennedy Center for its Expansion Project. He is also a founding supporter of the Southampton Arts Center. He is on the board of trustees of the Museum of Science and Industry in Chicago.

In the film industry, through his foundation Bohnett funded the restoration and DVD of the landmark 1977 film Word Is Out: Stories of Some of Our Lives, which featured interviews with 26 gay men and women. It was the first feature-length documentary film about gay identity made by gay filmmakers, and there was no viable print of it remaining. The restoration and DVD were done for the film's 30th anniversary; the restored and remastered film premiered in 2008 and the DVD was released in 2010. He was executive producer of the 2005 documentary Little Man, about a micro-preemie boy who was born 100 days too early and weighed only one pound at birth. Bohnett also made a major financial contribution to the 2007 documentary For the Bible Tells Me So, about homosexuality and its perceived conflict with Christianity. He was the executive producer of Political Animals, a 2016 documentary about the struggles of openly gay politicians.

He co-funded and co-sponsored the drive to continue the manufacture of peel-apart instant film. The initiative, headed by photographer Florian Kaps and the group New55, is relaunching 4×5-inch color peel-apart film and will manufacture other types of packfilm.

Bohnett was on the board of trustees of the Brookings Institution. He was on the board of directors of the Los Angeles World Affairs Council, and is currently on the board of trustees of the University of Southern California. His directorship involvements also include having been a board member of the California Community Foundation.

In 2016 Bohnett donated $15 million to the USC Village at the University of Southern California. The endowment will fund the David C. Bohnett Residential College, which will focus on social justice and community service. The Bohnett College will be a student community that integrates living and learning for up to 320 students, plus faculty-in-residence and support staff. The $15 million donation also established a leadership fund at the USC's Price School of Public Policy for a two-year fellowship in public policy at the Los Angeles County Board of Supervisors. It will also endow a chair in social entrepreneurship at the USC Marshall School of Business.

Bohnett is also a co-founder of the Lake Agawam Conservation Association in Southampton, New York, dedicated to rehabilitation of Lake Agawam and promoting environmentally sensitive riparian stewardship. Bohnett is also a Board Member of The Sherry-Netherland Foundation.

== Political involvement ==
Through his foundation and his personal efforts, Bohnett has long been politically active nationally, supporting and donating to political causes, ventures, and people he believes in strongly. His main areas of political donation and support have included LGBT politics, gun violence prevention, diversity empowerment supporting African American and Latino political involvement, political leadership training, voter registration, and the Democratic Party.

His LGBT rights political activism and support has included being a pioneer proponent for same-sex marriage: In the fall of 2000, at a political fundraiser at his home in Los Angeles that included a number of U.S. senators, he called for full equality for gays and lesbians, including same-sex marriage, and in 2004 he co-funded the Civil Marriage Collaborative to support marriage equality. He has supported major initiatives and donations to boost openly gay political leadership. The Bohnett Foundation has in particular been a major and long-term supporter of the Gay & Lesbian Victory Fund, especially its LGBT Leadership Fellows aimed at training LGBT leaders for state and local governments; as of 2017 the Bohnett Leaders Fellowship at the Victory Institute has sent 118 LGBT leaders to the Harvard Kennedy School's Senior Executives in State and Local Government program since 2002. The David Bohnett LGBTQ Leaders Fellowship alumni have included Kyrsten Sinema, the first openly bisexual U.S. congressperson, and Annise Parker, one of the first openly gay mayors of a major U.S. city (Houston).

Bohnett has made numerous personal political donations at a state level in California politics. In 1999 he donated $300,000 to help defeat Proposition 22, a March 2000 California ballot measure to limit marriage to heterosexuals. He was among the top 40 donors to California politics from 2001 through 2011. He was the single biggest funder of efforts to stop Proposition 8 in 2008, donating more than $1 million to the campaign to defeat it. He has supported a campaign to amend the 1978 property tax–capping initiative Proposition 13, on the grounds that it has negatively impacted California's fiscal health, affecting its schools, universities, fire and police departments, and other public institutions.

Bohnett has also advocated for the FCC's 2016 proposal to implement open technologies for the current set-top box technologies, which would break the corporate monopoly on cable and satellite companies' high-priced and controlled content of television programming and other video content.

== Honors ==
Bohnett's technology business success and his philanthropic efforts have garnered him numerous honors and accolades. These include, among many others:

- Number 16 on Time's Top 50 Cyber Elite (1998)
- Upside magazine's Elite 100 (1998)
- Newsweek's "100 People to Watch in the Next Millennium"
- Ernst & Young Entrepreneur of the Year Award for Southern California (1999)
- Los Angeles Gay and Lesbian Center's Rand Schrader Award (1999)
- Los Angeles Business Journal's Technology Leader of the Year (2000)
- ACLU Citizen Advocate Award (2002)
- amfAR Award of Courage (2006)
- Los Angeles City of Angels Award (2008)
- GLSEN's Lifetime Achievement Award (2009)
- Honorary doctorate of Humane Letters from Whittier College (2012)
- American Jewish Committee Los Angeles' Ira E. Yellin Community Leadership Award (2014)
- Brady Bear Award from the Brady Center to Prevent Gun Violence (2016)
- Los Angeles Business Journal's LA 500: The Most Influential People in Los Angeles (2017)
- Honorary doctorate of Humane Letters, University of Southern California (2022)
- LGBTQ Community Trailblazer Award from CenterLink (2024)
- Time magazine TIME100 Philanthropy leader (2025)

In 2013, Out magazine listed Bohnett as one of the "Seven notables coming up fast" appended to its "Power 50" list. In 2014, Inside Philanthropy listed him as one of the 12 Most Generous Tech Leaders. In 2018, Interesting Engineering listed him in the "27 Most Successful LGBT+ Entrepreneurs, Executives and Opinion Leaders".

Earlier in his career, he was invited to the White House by President Bill Clinton as part of his administration's efforts to encourage the development of electronic commerce over the Internet. He was named a Regents' Lecturer at the University of California, Los Angeles for the 1999 to 2000 academic year.

== Personal life ==
Bohnett lives in Los Angeles, and maintains residences in Manhattan and Southampton, New York, and Gstaad, Switzerland. In the Hamptons he is on the advisory council of the non-profit i-Hamptons, a networking organization and hub for entrepreneurs, and is on the advisory board of its project The Spur, a private co-working space and innovation lab with two locations in the Hamptons.

From 1983 through Schrader's death in 1993, he lived with fellow activist and openly gay judge Rand Schrader. In the 2000s, he lived for over a decade with entertainment and socio-political commentator and columnist Tom Gregory; they are no longer together.

An accomplished bridge player, Bohnett achieved Life Master status in 2008 at a national bridge tournament in Las Vegas, Nevada. He is an active outdoor enthusiast, having competed in numerous 5K and 10K races, and the 2008 Breath of Life Ventura Triathlon.

=== Art collection and donations ===
Bohnett is an avid art collector, specializing in modern and contemporary art. His large collection includes works by David Hockney, Willem de Kooning, Keith Haring, Donald Judd, Ed Ruscha, Mark DiSuvero, George Rickey, Sam Francis, Agnes Martin, Catherine Opie, Tatsuo Miyajima, Robbie Conal, Lawrence Weiner, and John Chamberlain.

According to Bohnett, he is particularly interested in art and artists that reflect social justice, fairness, and equality. He also collects pieces that operate on the intersection between art and technology. He owns one of the rare remaining Enigma machines, the subject of the film The Imitation Game – purchased in part because of his fascination with Alan Turing, who like Bohnett was a computer technologist and gay. In 2014, he donated two early-1980s' personal computer systems by Apple and IBM to the Rhode Island Computer Museum.

In 2002, he donated Jonathan Borofsky's 1991 sculpture Walking Man to the Museum of Contemporary Art, Los Angeles. In 2007, he donated two original Winsor McKay production animation drawings of Gertie the Dinosaur (1914) to the Fales Library at New York University, and a Japanese calligraphy box and letter box to the Los Angeles County Museum of Art (LACMA). In 2008 he was one of a consortium of six donors who funded LACMA's acquisition of 46 rare and historic masterworks of the Pacific Islands, and together with Tom Gregory funded LACMA's acquisition of James Turrell's 1966 free-standing work Afrum (White).
