= Sick: Survive the Night =

- Film poster
- Directed by: Ryan M. Andrews
- Written by: Ryan M. Andrews; Chris Cull
- Produced by: Bruno Marino; Michael Jari Davidson
- Starring: Christina Annie Aceto; Richard Sutton; Robert Nolan; Debbie Rochon
- Cinematography: Michael Jari Davidson
- Edited by: Navin Ramaswaran
- Music by: Andrew Lauzon
- Production company: Hellfire Pictures
- Release date: November 30, 2012
- Country: Canada
- Language: English

Sick: Survive the Night is a 2012 Canadian horror film directed by Ryan M. Andrews, written by Andrews and Chris Cull, and starring Christina Annie Aceto, Richard Sutton, Robert Nolan, and Debbie Rochon. Survivors of a zombie apocalypse attempt to find a cure and stay alive overnight during a siege.

== Plot ==
Survivors in a military bunker recruit Dr. Leigh Rozetta, a scientist, to find a cure for the zombie plague that has ravaged humanity. When she retreats to her parents' house, several survivalists join her along the way. The group attempts to survive the zombie hordes while dealing with their interpersonal issues.

== Cast ==
- Christina Annie Aceto as Dr. Leigh Rozetta
- Richard Sutton as Seph Copeland
- Robert Nolan as Mckay Jacobs
- Jennifer Polansky as Claudia Silveira
- Debbie Rochon as Dr. Joselda Fehmi
- Rodrigo Fernandez-Stoll as Jackson

== Production ==
The film was originally intended to be a short. When the plot developed beyond these limits, it was converted into a feature-length production. Andrews wanted to create a unique mythology for his film, so he worked to differentiate his zombies from the ones that he had seen in other films. One of his ideas was to take a meme associated with zombie films, that zombies eat brains, treat it seriously, and add a scientific rationale.

== Release ==
Sick: Survive the Night premiered at the Blood in the Snow Canadian Film Festival in 2012, before being released by Midnight Releasing on home video on January 6, 2015.

== Reception ==
Lacey Paige of Diabolique Magazine called it "a decent little independent zombie film" that "offers a unique take" on a tired subgenre. Dominic Cuthbert of Starburst rated it 5/10 stars and wrote, "Given its low budget, Andrews taps into the indie spirit with gusto, putting drama over horror, and while the blood doesn't splatter every which way, the performances fail to ignite." C. Rachel Katz of Influx Magazine rated it C and wrote, "In the end, Sick is a mixed bag of creative potential and questionable plot lines." Matt Boiselle of Dread Central rated it 2.5/5 stars and wrote that it does not distinguish itself from the glut of other low-budget zombie films.
