= 24: Conspiracy =

Television series

- Created by: Marc Ostrick and Eric Neal Young
- Starring: Dylan Bruce; Beverly Bryant; Steve Kramer; Amy Rider
- Composer: John Massari
- Country of origin: United States

Production
- Running time: 24 minutes total, 1 minute each episode

Original release
- Network: Verizon
- Release: January 30, 2005

24: Conspiracy is a low-budget, mobile-only spin-off of the television drama program 24. It was released on January 30, 2005, after the premiere of the fourth season and was released in three-day intervals. It is the first mobisode FOX released.

Set in Washington, D.C., it takes place over twenty-four non-linear one-minute episodes, and it appears to take place during Day 4, as indicated by a reference to the Heller kidnapping by James Sutton happening that day. The 24 minutes of the show do not happen in real time; instead each minute takes place at a different given time in the day.

== Product history ==
Conspiracy was first announced on November 10, 2004, revealing that new actors and characters would be used, set during the show's fourth season.

== Availability ==
Originally released as a mobisode, Conspiracy is available in various countries, but has been made available online through digital download and piracy. In DVD Regions 1 and Regions 4, the full 24 episodes are available on DVD, and are also available on cell phone providers, Vodafone 3G in the United Kingdom, Vodafone K.K. in Japan, Orange in Israel, CTI Movil in Argentina and Verizon Wireless in the United States.

== Cast ==
- Dylan Bruce as Martin Kail
- Beverly Bryant as Susan Walker
- Steve Kramer as James Sutton
- Amy Rider as Kelly

== Producers and directors ==
- Gary Newman (Producer)
- Steven Melnick (Producer)
- Mitch Feinman (Producer)
- Lucy Hood (Producer)
- Eric Young (Director)
- Marc Ostrick (Director)
