= First Round Down =

2016 film by the Butler Brothers

- Directed by: The Butler Brothers
- Written by: Brett M. Butler; Jason G. Butler
- Produced by: Brett M. Butler; Jason G. Butler; Marina Cordoni
- Starring: Dylan Bruce; Rachel Wilson; Rob Ramsay; Peter MacNeill; John Kapelos; Kristian Bruun
- Cinematography: Michael Jari Davidson
- Edited by: The Butler Brothers
- Distributed by: Unobstructed View
- Release dates: 2 October 2016 (Edmonton International Film Festival); 7 May 2017
- Running time: 96 minutes
- Country: Canada
- Language: English

First Round Down is a 2016 Canadian action comedy film written and directed by the Butler Brothers. The film stars Dylan Bruce as Tim Tucker, a former junior hockey star that disappeared after he blew out his knee in the Sterling Cup Championship final and returns home ten years later to look after his younger brother after his parents die. Trying to keep a low profile Tim takes a job as a pizza delivery driver but it doesn't take long for word to get around that he's back in town, especially after he delivers pizza to his ex-girlfriend, Kelly (played by Rachel Wilson), the daughter of his former coach, who is also in town for the Championship reunion. Through a series of twists and turns, it's revealed that Tim worked as a hitman the last ten years and the coach is actually targeted by his old mob boss. Tim enlists the help of his best friend, Bobby (played by Rob Ramsay) to hatch a plan that will save himself and the coach by stealing $50,000 from the reunion, and win Kelly back once and for all.

The film premiered at the 2016 Atlantic Film Festival. The US premiere was at the 2017 Gasparilla Film Festival. The film was released theatrically in Canada on May 5, 2017, by Unobstructed View, landing in the top five box office for Canadian films during its opening week and the number one film at the Carlton theater in Toronto.

== Cast ==
- Dylan Bruce as Tim Tucker
- Rachel Wilson as Kelly Quinn
- Rob Ramsay as Bobby Finkelman
- Peter MacNeill as Coach Quinn
- John Kapelos as Sonny
- Kristian Bruun as Winston
- Percy Hynes White as Matthew Tucker
- Joel Thomas Hynes as Jon
- Boomer Phillips as Steel Mill Bill
- Pedro Miguel Arce as Ron
- Sugith Varughese as Navin
