= Rand Schrader =

American judge

Judge of the Los Angeles Municipal Court
- In office 1980 – April 1993
- Appointed by: Jerry Brown

Personal details
- Born: May 11, 1945 Los Angeles, California, U.S.
- Died: June 13, 1993 (aged 48) Century City, California, U.S.
- Domestic partner: David Bohnett
- Education: University of California, Berkeley; UCLA School of Law

Rand Schrader (May 11, 1945 – June 13, 1993) was an American AIDS and gay rights activist who also served as a judge of the Los Angeles Municipal Court.

== Early life and education ==
Schrader was born in Los Angeles, California. He graduated from the University of California, Berkeley and then from the University of California, Los Angeles School of Law in 1973.

== Professional career and judicial service ==
After graduating from law school, Schrader was hired by Los Angeles City Attorney Burt Pines. He was the first openly gay staffer to work in the Los Angeles City Attorney's office.

In 1980, Schrader was appointed to the Los Angeles Municipal Court by Governor Jerry Brown. Schrader was recommended to Brown by gay rights activist Sheldon Andelson. Schrader served on the bench until April 1993.

== AIDS-related advocacy and death ==
Los Angeles County Supervisor Ed Edelman appointed Schrader to the Los Angeles County AIDS Commission when it was established in 1987. Schrader served as chairman of the commission from 1989 to 1991.

In 1991, Schrader announced that he had been recently diagnosed with AIDS. He disclosed that he had tested positive for HIV in 1989 and had developed pneumocystis pneumonia in October 1991. Schrader went public with his diagnosis in an attempt increase AIDS awareness and to combat discrimination and misinformation associated with AIDS.

Schrader died from AIDS-related complications on June 13, 1993, in Century City, California.

Shortly before his death, in May 1993, the 5P21 HIV/AIDS clinic at Los Angeles County – USC Medical Center was named in honor of him. Schrader had previously advocated for the establishment of the clinic.

== Personal ==
Schrader's long-time partner was entrepreneur David Bohnett, who after Schrader's death used his own entire life savings and the $386,000 benefits from Schrader's life insurance to create the pioneering website GeoCities. At the time of Schrader's death, they had been partnered for 10 years.

== See also ==
- List of LGBT jurists in the United States
