= Starsuckers (2026 film) =

2026 Canadian horror film

- Directed by: Brett and Jason Butler
- Written by: Brett and Jason Butler
- Produced by: Brett and Jason Butler
- Starring: Jacob Stickles; Jersey Anderson; James Alex; Manon Ens-Lapointe; Steven Hobé
- Cinematography: Matthew X. Wiewel
- Edited by: Brett and Jason Butler
- Production company: Substance Production
- Release date: August 29, 2026 (FrightFest)
- Running time: 86 minutes
- Country: Canada
- Language: English

Starsuckers is a Canadian satirical horror film, directed by Brett and Jason Butler and released in 2026. A satire of modern celebrity culture, the film stars Jacob Stickles and Jersey Anderson as Chuck and Eileen, a couple who win an exclusive weekend getaway with celebrities Bjorg Everglow (James Alex) and Sasha Nightshade (Manon Ens-Lapointe), only to be drawn into a spiral of murder and manipulation.

The cast also includes Steven Hobé as Belvedere.

The film was shot in September 2025 in Sudbury, Ontario.

The film premiered at the 2026 edition of FrightFest, followed by its Canadian premiere at the 2026 Cinéfest Sudbury International Film Festival.
