= Robert Nolan =

Canadian actor

Robert Nolan is an English-speaking Canadian actor working in the region of Toronto. He is mainly known in the world of web series, to be Steven LeMay, one of the main roles of many-times-awarded LGBT webseries, Out With Dad (Seasons 1 & 2). In 2014 Nolan portrayed the character of Warren Gabriel in Director Jeffrey W. Pike's short film Playground Rules which was screened internationally to a warm audience reception that citied Nolan's performance convincing as an intimidating and money hungry CEO.

== Filmography ==
=== Cinema ===
==== Movies ====
- 1991 - Tiger Claws: Roberts
- 2009 - The Red Pearl
- 2010 - Severance: Tom Braddock
- 2011 - Lucky 7: Brian
- 2011 - Searching for Angels: Doctor
- 2011 - Night Express
- 2012 - Skeleton Lake: Logan
- 2012 - Sick: Mckay Jacobs
- 2012 - The Prospector's Curse: The Prospector
- 2013 - Antisocial: Priest
- 2013 - Mourning Has Broken: Husband
- 2013 - Silent Retreat (2013 film): Doctor
- 2014 - Tension(s): Karl Fisher
- 2014 - Berkshire County: Glen Harrison
- 2014 - Late Night Double Feature: Night Clown
- 2015 - Canswer: Cillian

==== Short movies ====
- 2006 - The Universal Hanging Together of all Things: Deusecks
- 2006 - Nothing Shocks Anyone Anymore: Gambler
- 2007 - The Restore: The Politician
- 2007 - Please Stand By...: PSA Host
- 2007 - Scalped: Ned
- 2007 - The Good Son: Agent Davidson
- 2007 - Lost Little Girl: The Suspect
- 2008 - Title Match: Dr. Campbell
- 2008 - Rescue: Boss
- 2008 - Kill Your Television: Doctor
- 2008 - Hard Time: Mr. Tick
- 2008 - Coldplay: Lost?: French Imperial Guard #1
- 2008 - Scent of Rosemary: Lawrence
- 2009 - Homeless Yoga: Alan
- 2009 - MK Ultra: Narrator
- 2009 - Chop Chop... You're Dead: Thug
- 2009 - The Seventh Shadow: The Mobster
- 2009 - Reverie Three: Hanley Wortzik
- 2009 - This Movie Sucks: Jeremy Buckingham
- 2009 - The Man Machine: Gerhard
- 2009 - God's Acre: Father
- 2009 - Babykiller: Debate Host
- 2010 - Worm: Geoffrey Dodd
- 2010 - Lavender Fields: Man
- 2010 - Crossword Dreaming: Detective
- 2010 - Water Babies: Philip
- 2010 - Restaurant Etiquette: Brick Tomly
- 2010 - Machiavelli's The Prince: Mr. Harvey
- 2010 - Janus: Mark - Businessman
- 2010 - Eyes Beyond: Henry Rogers
- 2011 - A Date with Fear: David
- 2011 - Call of Duty: Find Makarov: Soldier 3
- 2011 - Stealin' Home: Officer Finley
- 2011 - Call of Duty: Operation Kingfish: Helicopter Pilot (voice)
- 2011 - Daddy's Little Girl: Michael
- 2011 - The Devil Walks Among You: The Tall Man
- 2011 - Teach'er: Professor
- 2011 - Symbiosis: Roy
- 2011 - Stereography Experiment No.1: Dominic
- 2011 - Roachfar: Mr. Smith
- 2012 - Familiar: John Dodd
- 2012 - Your Sample, Please
- 2012 - Eviction: Father Grimes
- 2012 - The Rising Cost of Medicine: Doctor
- 2013 - Killing Love: Driver
- 2013 - Dead All Night: Officer #1
- 2014 - The Resurrections of Clarence Neveldine: Dr. Elliott Fleming
- 2014 - Playground Rules: Warren Gabriel

==== Animated films ====
- 2009 - Archon Defender: Alan / Soldats d'Echelon / Garde d'Echelon

=== Television ===
==== TV films ====
- 2010 - Red: Werewolf Hunter: Homme du Moyen Âge (Middle Age Man)
- 2012 - The Real Inglorious Bastards: Walter Guettner / Narrateur (voix)

==== TV series ====
- 2007 - Zero Hour: Don McCormack (Épisode S3E04)
- 2007 - Life or Death: Dr. ND #1 (Épisode 2 "Brain Attack")
- 2009 - Psychic Investigators: Laborentin (Lab Technician, Épisode S3E13)
- 2010 - Outlaw Bikers: Hilmaire Sousmire (Épisode 9 "Fallen Angels")
- 2010 - Breakout: John Moriarty (Épisode S1E01)
- 2011-2012 - Paranormal Witness: Électricien (Épisode S1E04) & Rob Graves (Épisode S2E09)
- 2012 - Motives & Murders: Cracking the Case: Gordon Rondeau (Épisode S1E09)
- 2013 - Breakout: Rondell Reed (Épisode S2E07)
- 2013 - Surviving Evil: Michael Holsapple (Épisode S2E02)

=== Internet ===
==== Web series ====
- 2011–present - Out With Dad: Steven LeMay
- 2011 - Dominion: The Web Series: Trevor
- 2012-2013 - Out of Time: Dr. Harold Osborn
- 2013 - Gay Nerds: Rendez-vous mystère (Mystery Date, Épisode S1E04)
- 2013-2014 - Improbabilia: Dr. Snowdon
- 2013-2014 - Pete Winning and the Pirates: Remy
- 2015 - Haphead: Patron (Boss)

== Awards and nominations ==
He was nominated and received the following awards:

=== 2012 ===
LA Web Series Festival 2012 (prix multiples dans la même catégorie)

- Awards = Outstanding Ensemble Cast in a Drama for " Out with Dad " :
  - Kate Conway, Will Conlon, Lindsey Middleton, Corey Lof, Laura Jabalee, Darryl Dinn, Jacob Ahearn, Wendy Glazier, Robert Nolan.

Academy of WebTelevision Awards

- Nomination: Best Ensemble Performance for " Out with Dad "

=== 2014 ===
5th Indie Soap Awards (2014) (1 only winner in a category)

- Nominations: Best Supporting Actor, Drama for " Out with Dad "

FilmQuest Film Festival, US

- Nomination: Best Actor for " Familiar " (2012)

Queens World Film Festival

- Award: Best Actor in a Feature Film for " Mourning Has Broken " (2013)

=== 2015 ===
Academy of WebTelevision Awards 2015

- Award: Best Ensemble Performance for " Out with Dad "
