= Dylan Bruce =

Canadian actor

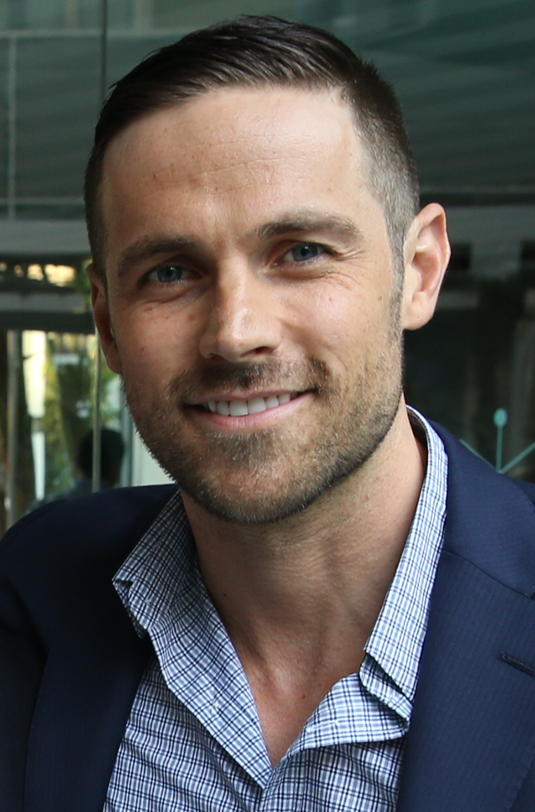
- Bruce in March 2015
- Born: April 21, 1980 (age 46); Vancouver, British Columbia, Canada
- Education: University of Washington
- Occupation: Actor
- Years active: 2005–present

Dylan Bruce (born April 21, 1980) is a Canadian actor known for his roles as Chris Hughes on the CBS daytime soap opera As the World Turns and Paul Dierden on BBC America and Space's Orphan Black.

== Early life ==
Bruce was born on April 21, 1980, in Vancouver, British Columbia, and raised in Boundary Bay. Bruce attended University of Washington in Seattle, Washington, and graduated with a degree in Drama and Economics before moving to Los Angeles, California. He launched his career by modeling in Seattle through Seattle Models Guild. He appeared on the cover of the November 10, 2004, issue of Daily Variety.

== Career ==
In 2005, Bruce landed his first role as Counter Terrorist Unit (CTU) Agent Martin Kail on 24: Conspiracy, a mobile-only spin-off of the television series 24. That same year, he guest-starred for two episodes on the NBC daytime soap opera Passions and appeared as a waiter on the television sitcom Joey. In 2006, he appeared on The Sopranos and on the reality television series Breaking Up with Shannen Doherty. He appeared as Sam Marquez (Vanessa Marcil)'s secretary, Anthony, on Las Vegas in 2007.

In 2007, Bruce landed his most notable role of Chris Hughes on the CBS daytime soap opera As the World Turns. Bruce became the eighth actor to play the role, succeeding Bailey Chase, who played the role from January 29, 2003, to January 20, 2005. Bruce made his debut on October 25, 2007. In August 2008, it was announced that Bruce was downgraded to recurring status. He made his final appearance on October 15, 2008.

In 2011, Bruce starred in Hallmark Channel's original film Love's Christmas Journey. In the following year, he had the role of Mark Hanson in Lifetime's thriller film Willed to Kill.

As of 2013, Bruce co-stars as Paul Dierden on the sci-fi television series Orphan Black, co-produced by Space and BBC America. He also guest-stars as Adam Donner on The CW series Arrow.

In 2014, Bruce starred as Bart Winslow in the modern remake of V.C. Andrews's Flowers in the Attic, and its sequel, Petals on the Wind. In January 2015, Bruce starred in the television movie A Novel Romance on the Hallmark Channel.

In May 2015, after leaving Orphan Black, Bruce said: "I count my lucky stars every day to have been blessed with this experience. Paul was definitely a fun character to play, I really had fun researching him and researching military guys and how they operate and how they think. It was just a really, really life-altering experience that I'll never forget."

In October 2015, Bruce appeared in Heroes Reborn as Captain James Dearing in recurring role. In 2016, Bruce starred in the action comedy movie First Round Down. He starred in the NBC series Midnight, Texas, where he played Bobo Winthrop.

== Filmography ==
=== Film ===
Year	Title	Role	Notes
2010	Unstoppable	Michael Colson	
2016	First Round Down	Tim Tucker	

=== Television ===
Year	Title	Role	Notes
2005	Passions	Dream Guy	2 episodes
2005	Joey	Waiter	2 episodes
2005	24: Conspiracy	Martin Kail	Main role; 24 episodes
2006	The Sopranos	Doorman	Episode: "Luxury Lounge"
2007	Las Vegas	Anthony	Episode: "Junk in the Trunk"
2007	CSI: NY	Young Man	Episode: "Down the Rabbit Hole"
2007–2008	As the World Turns	Chris Hughes	Contract role; 100 episodes
2010–2012	The Bay	Brian Nelson	Recurring role; 22 episodes
2011	NCIS	Justin Fanniker	Episode: "Engaged (Part I)"
2011	Love's Christmas Journey	Michael	Television film
2012	Willed to Kill	Mark Hanson	Television film
2014	Matador	Gabriel	Episode: "Quid Go Pro"
2013–2014	Arrow	Adam Donner	Recurring role; 8 episodes
2013–2016	Orphan Black	Paul Dierden	Main role (seasons 1–4)
2014	Flowers in the Attic	Bart Winslow	Television film
2014	Petals on the Wind	Bart Winslow	Television film
2015	Heroes Reborn	James Dearing	Recurring role; 5 episodes
2015	A Novel Romance	Liam Bradley	Television film
2016	Motive	Scott	Episode: "The Dead Hand"
2016	American Gothic	Tom Price	Recurring role; 7 episodes
2017–2018	Midnight, Texas	Bobo Winthrop	Main role
2019	The Murders	Nolan Wells	Main role
2021	The Christmas Promise	Joe Roberts	Television Film Hallmark Movies & Mysteries
2022	Francesca Quinn PI	Detective Wynton Rousseau	Television Film Hallmark Movies & Mysteries
2024	The Spiderwick Chronicles	Tanner Kent	Recurring role
2025	Tracker	Nate Riggins	Episode: "Man's Best Friend"
2025	We Were Liars	Brody Sheffield	Recurring role, 5 episodes
