= Dr. Seuss bibliography =

Theodor Seuss Geisel, better known as Dr. Seuss, published over 60 children's books over the course of his long career. Though most were published under his well-known pseudonym, Dr. Seuss, he also authored a number of books as Theo. LeSieg and one as Rosetta Stone.

As one of the most popular children's authors of all time, Geisel's books have topped many bestseller lists, sold over 600 million copies and had been translated into more than 20 languages by the time of his death. In 2000, when Publishers Weekly compiled their list of the best-selling children's books of all time, 16 of the top 100 hardcover books were written by Geisel, including Green Eggs and Ham at number 4, The Cat in the Hat at number 9, and One Fish Two Fish Red Fish Blue Fish at number 13. In the years following his death in 1991, several additional books based on his sketches and notes were published, including Hooray for Diffendoofer Day! and Daisy-Head Mayzie. Although they were all published under the name Dr. Seuss, only My Many Colored Days, originally written in 1973, was entirely by Geisel.

== Dr. Seuss books ==
The bulk of Geisel's books were published under the name Dr. Seuss. The exceptions include Great Day for Up!, My Book about ME, Gerald McBoing Boing, The Cat in the Hat Beginner Book Dictionary (credited to the Cat himself), 13 books credited to Theo. LeSeig, Because a Little Bug Went Ka-Choo! and I Am Not Going to Get Up Today!, though all were in fact illustrated and written by Geisel. Note only first edition information is given.

The rights to the books and related media (films, TV shows, stage productions, exhibitions, digital media, licensed merchandise and other strategic partnerships) are owned by Dr. Seuss Enterprises.

No.	Title	Year	Publisher
1	The Pocket Book of Boners	1931	Viking Press
This book is a collection of humorous anecdotes and illustrations representing some of the earliest work credited to Dr. Seuss. The 1941 printing of The Pocket Book of Boners compiles four separate books that were issued in 1931. The first book was illustrated by Dr. Seuss.
2	And to Think That I Saw It on Mulberry Street	1937	Vanguard Press (original issue)/Random House (reissue)
Marco watches the sights and sounds of people and vehicles traveling along Mulberry Street and dreams up an elaborate story to tell to his father at the end of his walk. The first book written, created and originated by Dr. Seuss. Made into an Oscar-nominated short in 1943 as part of George Pal's Madcap Models series distributed by Paramount Pictures.
3	The 500 Hats of Bartholomew Cubbins	1938	Vanguard Press (original issue)/Random House (reissue)
In the kingdom of Didd, King Derwin is riding through a street past Bartholomew Cubbins, a poor boy in the market. Bartholomew removes his hat according to the laws, but another hat mysteriously appears; when he attempts to remove this one too, another one appears again, and this continues, even as he removes more and more hats, each growing in extravagance and beauty. This is the first book for which Dr. Seuss did not write any words in rhyme. Made into an Oscar-nominated short in 1943 as part of George Pal's Madcap Models series distributed by Paramount Pictures.
4	The King's Stilts	1939	Random House
The story of King Birtram of Binn, who dedicates himself to safeguarding his kingdom, which has a precarious existence. It is surrounded by water, which is held back from flooding the land by a ring of dike trees, which are in turn subject to attack from flocks of Nizzards. To protect the kingdom, a legion of Patrol Cats is organized to keep the Nizzards at bay, and King Birtram sees to their care personally.
5	The Seven Lady Godivas	1939	Random House
The seven Lady Godivas each learn a moral while taking care of a horse.
6	Horton Hatches the Egg	1940	Random House
An elephant named Horton is convinced by an irresponsible bird named Mayzie to sit on her egg while she takes a short break, which proves to last for months. Made into an animated short in 1942 as part of Warner Bros.' Merrie Melodies series.
7	McElligot's Pool	1947	Random House
A Caldecott Honor Book. A boy named Marco is ridiculed for fishing in a small, polluted pool, and tries to justify himself by imagining the fish he might catch. It is one of the few books by Geisel to use paintings as the medium for its illustrations, rather than his common use of pen and ink.
8	Thidwick the Big-Hearted Moose	1948	Random House
Thidwick, a moose who lives in a herd of "about sixty or more", accepts a bug living on his antlers for free, who tells a spider of the free housing, and both accept a "Zinn-a-zu" bird, and this leads to a whole host of freeloaders taking up residence.
9	Bartholomew and the Oobleck	1949	Random House
A Caldecott Honor Book. Bartholomew must rescue the kingdom from a sticky substance called Oobleck. The sequel to The 500 Hats of Bartholomew Cubbins.
10	If I Ran the Zoo	1950	Random House
A Caldecott Honor Book. Gerald McGrew visits a zoo and finds that the animals are "not good enough" and describes how he would run the zoo. He would let all of the current animals free and find new, more bizarre and exotic ones.
11	Gerald McBoing-Boing	1952	Simon & Schuster/Random House (current reissue)/Golden Books (former reissue)
Based on the Academy Award-winning 1950 short film of the same name. First Dr. Seuss book not illustrated by Geisel.
12	Scrambled Eggs Super!	1953	Random House
A young boy named Peter T. Hooper spins a tale of an incredible meal he created by harvesting the eggs of fantastically exotic birds.
13	Horton Hears a Who!	1954	Random House
Horton the Elephant of the Jungle of Nool hears a speck of dust talking to him. The speck of dust is actually a tiny planet, home to a city called Who-ville, inhabited by microscopic-sized inhabitants known as Whos and led by a character known as the Mayor. The sequel to Horton Hatches the Egg. Adapted into a 1970 television special and a 2008 animated feature-length film.
14	On Beyond Zebra!	1955	Random House
The young narrator, not content with the confines of the ordinary alphabet, invents additional letters beyond Z, with a fantastic creature corresponding to each new letter.
15	If I Ran the Circus	1956	Random House
Behind Mr. Sneelock's ramshackle store, there is an empty lot. Little Morris McGurk is convinced that if he could just clear out the rusty cans, the dead tree, and the old cars, nothing would prevent him from using the lot for the amazing, world-beating, Circus McGurkus. The sequel to If I Ran the Zoo.
16	The Cat in the Hat	1957	Random House/Houghton Mifflin
The Cat in the Hat brings his companions, Thing One and Thing Two, to a household of two young children one rainy day. Chaos ensues while the children wonder how they are going to explain what happens to their mother. The first Beginner Books entry written and illustrated by Dr. Seuss and the book that started the line, Geisel wrote it using only 236 words in response to a concern that the primers popular at the time, such as those featuring the characters Dick and Jane, were too dull to effectively teach children to read. Decades later, Geisel would call this the book he was most proud of, as it helped end the use of those primers. Adapted into a 1971 television special, a PC game from Living Books, a 2003 live-action feature-length film, and a 2026 animated feature-length film.
17	How the Grinch Stole Christmas!	1957	Random House
The Grinch, a bitter, cave-dwelling creature, raids the town of Who-ville, where he tries to steal everything related to Christmas by impersonating Santa Claus. Eventually, he realizes he has a heart for Christmas after all. Adapted into a 1966 television special, a 2000 live-action feature-length film, a 2018 animated feature-length film, and an annual musical. The 2020 COVID-19 pandemic shut down the theater and the production created a free radio drama show.
18	Yertle the Turtle and Other Stories	1958	Random House
Consists of three stories: Yertle the Turtle: Unsatisfied with the stone that serves as his throne, the king turtle commands the other turtles to stack themselves beneath him so that he can see further and expand his kingdom.; Gertrude McFuzz: The "girl-bird" Gertrude McFuzz has one small, plain tail feather and envies Lolla-Lee-Lou, who has two fancy tail feathers.; The Big Brag: A rabbit and a bear both boast that they are the "best of the beasts", because of the range of their hearing and smelling abilities, respectively.
19	The Cat in the Hat Comes Back	1958	Random House
The Cat in the Hat returns, bringing along Little Cat A nested inside his hat. Little Cat A doffs his hat to reveal Little Cat B, who in turn reveals Little Cat C, and so on down to the microscopic Little Cat Z. Together they try to get rid of a pink ring that has spread from the bathtub to the dress, to the wall, into some shoes, and finally out onto the snow where they work to get rid of it.
20	Happy Birthday to You!	1959	Random House
Deals with a fantastic land, called Katroo, where the Birthday Bird throws everyone an amazing party on their special day.
21	One Fish, Two Fish, Red Fish, Blue Fish	1960	Random House
A simple rhyming book for learner readers with a freewheeling plot about a boy and a girl and the many amazing creatures they have for friends and as pets.
22	Green Eggs and Ham	1960	Random House
Sam-I-Am tries to offer an unnamed man (who is also the narrator; later named Guy-Am-I in the 2019 animated series) a plate of green eggs and ham. The man refuses to eat the food, insisting that he would not like it until the end. Following a series of successful Dr. Seuss books intended for beginning readers and using limited vocabularies, the book was the result of a $50 bet between Geisel and his editor Bennett Cerf that Geisel could not write a book using only 50 unique words; it contains exactly 50. Adapted into a 1973 television special and a 2019 animated series, both by Warner Bros. Animation. Also adapted into a PC game by Living Books.
23	The Sneetches and Other Stories	1961	Random House
Consists of four stories: The Sneetches: Because the Star-Bellied Sneetches are being prejudicial to the Plain-Bellied Sneetches, a "fix-it-up chappie" named Sylvester McMonkey McBean appears and offers the Sneetches without stars a chance to have them by going through his Star-On Machine. Adapted into a 1973 television special.; The Zax: A North-Going Zax and a South-Going Zax meet face to face in the Prairie of Prax. They refuse to move out of the way for one another and end up staying there. Teaches the value of compromise. Adapted into a 1973 television special.; Too Many Daves: A mother, Mrs. McCave, who named all 23 of her sons Dave and has trouble telling them apart.; What Was I Scared Of?: The tale of a character who repeatedly meets up with an empty pair of pale-green pants and has to learn to accept them.
24	Dr. Seuss's Sleep Book	1962	Random House
A small bug yawn spreads contagiously and though various creatures, including two Foona Lagoona Baboona, the Collapsable Frink, the Chippendale Mupp, two Offt, and the Curious Krandles.
25	Dr. Seuss's ABC	1963	Random House
An alphabet book which features many strange creatures from Aunt Annie's Alligator to the Zizzer-Zazzer-Zuzz. Adapted into a PC game by Living Books. In the 2008 animated film Horton Hears a Who!, Yaks (including Katie (voiced by Joey King), which resembled the Yawning Yellow Yak) appear as residents of The Jungle of Nool.
26	Hop on Pop	1963	Random House
Hop on Pop provides simple rhymes to help beginner reading, such as a character named Pat who sits on a hat, a cat, a bat and must not sit on that (which is a cactus). Shows a variety of characters and teaches sentence composition.
27	The Cat in the Hat Beginner Book Dictionary	1964	Random House
This dictionary book was written and illustrated by P. D. Eastman (and Peter Eastman in the additional in 2007). This is the very first Beginner Books special written by Dr. Seuss (credited as the Cat himself). The signature credit that said, "Dr. Seuss", was in the original and seen on the first page.
28	Fox in Socks	1965	Random House
A fox in socks challenges Mr. Knox with ever-more complex rhyming tongue-twisters, which begins to get on Knox's nerves.
29	I Had Trouble in Getting to Solla Sollew	1965	Random House
A tale of a young person who discovers the "troubles" of life and wishes to escape them.
30	The Cat in the Hat Song Book	1967	Random House
A book exploring a wide variety of Dr. Seuss songs. Piano score and guitar chords by Eugene Poddany.
31	The Foot Book	1968	Random House
Introduces many different creatures with different feet. The first Bright and Early Books entry written and illustrated by Dr. Seuss and the book that started the line.
32	I Can Lick 30 Tigers Today! and Other Stories	1969	Random House
The title story concerns a boy who brags that he can fight 30 tigers and win. However, he makes excuse after excuse, finally disqualifying all the tigers until he must fight no tigers at all. The illustrations are notable for their use of gouache and brush strokes rather than the usual pen and ink. Other stories include King Looie Katz, another warning against hierarchical society advocating self-reliance, and The Glunk That Got Thunk about the power of run-away imagination.
33	My Book about ME	1969	Random House
This book is deliberately incomplete as there are blanks on every page where the child is meant to fill in answers specific to them.
34	I Can Draw It Myself	1970	Random House
A coloring book featuring rhyming instructions to help children complete various pictures, culminating in a challenge to the child to draw his or her own "Big Something". The full title of the book is I Can Draw It Myself by Me, Myself.
35	Mr. Brown Can Moo! Can You?	1970	Random House
The book shows the sounds "Mr. Brown" can make, such as a cow's "moo", a frying pan's "sizzle", and a hippo's "grum". It was written so children would be able to learn about onomatopoeia and the sounds that they hear every day.
36	The Lorax	1971	Random House
The Lorax chronicles the plight of the environment and the Lorax (a mossy, bossy man-like creature resembling an emperor tamarin), who speaks for the trees against the greedy Once-ler. Adapted into a 1972 television special, a 2012 animated feature-length film, and a 2018 musical.
37	Marvin K. Mooney Will You Please Go Now!	1972	Random House
Marvin K. Mooney is asked to leave in many ways.
38	Did I Ever Tell You How Lucky You Are?	1973	Random House
Discusses an amusing litany of terrible predicaments which could befall a person, with the repeated admonishment that "you're really quite lucky".
39	The Shape of Me and Other Stuff	1973	Random House
Explores the adventures of two kids and their journey to learn about all the shapes and sizes that make up our world.
40	There's a Wocket in My Pocket	1974	Random House
A little boy talks about the strange creatures that live in his house, such as the Yeps on the steps, the Nooth Grush on his toothbrush, the Yottle in the bottle and the Jertain in the curtain. The last Bright and Early Books entry illustrated by Dr. Seuss.
41	Great Day for Up!	1974	Random House
Every new day starts a new adventure. Illustrated by Quentin Blake.
42	Oh, the Thinks You Can Think!	1975	Random House
About the many amazing 'thinks' one can think and the endless possibilities and dreams that imagination can create.
43	The Cat's Quizzer	1976	Random House
The Cat in the Hat asks many, sometimes ridiculous, questions of the reader. This is the only Beginner Books reissue (B-75) written and illustrated by Dr. Seuss.
44	I Can Read with My Eyes Shut!	1978	Random House
The Cat in the Hat shows a Young Cat the fun he can get out of reading. Also shows that reading is a useful tool to acquire knowledge.
45	Oh Say Can You Say?	1979	Random House
A collection of 25 tongue-twisters such as "Oh my brothers! Oh my sisters! These are Terrible Tongue Twisters!" The last Beginner Books entry illustrated by Dr. Seuss.
46	Hunches in Bunches	1982	Random House
A boy is approached by numerous strange creatures with enormous gloved hats on their heads. Each "hunch" points out a different possible course of action, with some even contradicting themselves.
47	The Butter Battle Book	1984	Random House
The conflict between the Yooks and the Zooks over which side of bread to spread butter on leads to an arms race, each competing to make bigger and nastier weapons to outdo the other, which results in the threat of mutual assured destruction. Adapted into a 1989 television special.
48	You're Only Old Once!	1986	Random House
An old man journeys through a medical clinic and sees its inefficiency.
49	I Am Not Going to Get Up Today!	1987	Random House
A lazy boy chooses to stay in bed despite media coverage and the arrival of the U.S. Marines. Illustrated by James Stevenson; the last Beginner Books entry written by Dr. Seuss.
50	The Tough Coughs as He Ploughs the Dough	1987	Random House
A collection of Dr. Seuss's early writings and cartoons, edited by Richard Marschall.
51	Oh, the Places You'll Go!	1990	Random House
Dr. Seuss's last book published before his death, about life and its challenges.

== Posthumous ==
Geisel also wrote several books that were posthumously published under his most recognizable pen name, Dr. Seuss.

Title	Year	Published By
Daisy-Head Mayzie	1995	Random House
The book is about a warmhearted schoolgirl named Mayzie who one day suddenly sprouts a bright yellow daisy from her head. This makes her famous and she starts to miss her normal life. The book was originally not illustrated by Geisel but rather by an uncredited Joe Mathieu. The book was re-published with Geisel's illustrations in 2016.
My Many Colored Days	1996	Alfred A. Knopf
A rhyming story, written in 1973, which describes each day in a particular color which is in turn associated with a specific emotion. Book paintings by Steve Johnson and Lou Fancher.
The Big Green Book of Beginner Books	1997	Random House
The first two Dr. Seuss Bright and Early Books and the final four Dr. Seuss Beginner Books are in one volume. Final Dr. Seuss book not illustrated by Geisel.
Oh, Baby, the Places You'll Go!	1997	Life Favors/Random House
A story meant to be read to babies in utero, bringing a large number of Dr. Seuss characters to print, showing the baby all the creatures and adventures they will get to meet and experience once they are born. It is considered a baby-fied version of Oh! The Places You'll Go! Original release was a miniature version. It was released in a regular-sized hardcover format on July 28, 2015, to coincide with the release of What Pet Should I Get?, the newest Seuss book that was released at the same time. Adapted by Tish Rabe from the works of Dr. Seuss.
Hooray for Diffendoofer Day!	1998	Random House
The story surrounds a school that is well liked by its students, notably because of its many eccentric teachers. Expanded and completed by Jack Prelutsky and illustrated by Lane Smith.
Your Favorite Seuss	2004	Random House
Only a dozen Dr. Seuss classics with artists by his others.
The Bippolo Seed and Other Lost Stories	2011	Random House
This book collects seven stories published in Redbook from 1948 to 1959: "The Bippolo Seed"; "The Rabbit, The Bear, and the Zinniga-Zanniga"; "Gustav, the Goldfish"; "Tadd and Todd"; "Steak for Supper"; "The Strange Shirt Spot"; and "The Great Henry McBride". Book introduction by Charles D. Cohen.
My Big Book of Beginner Books about Me	2011	Random House
His work with others is included in this book. This is the only Beginner Book without the Beginner Books label.
Horton and the Kwuggerbug and More Lost Stories	2014	Random House
Four more stories originally published in Redbook from 1950 to 1955: "Horton and the Kwuggerbug" (January 1951); "Marco Comes Late" (September 1950); "How Officer Pat Saved the Whole Town" (October 1950); and "The Hoobub and the Grinch" (May 1955). Book introduction by Charles D. Cohen.
The Big Orange Book of Beginner Books	2015	Random House
The first four Dr. Seuss Bright and Early Books and the final two Beginner Books are in one volume. This book was illustrated by Dr. Seuss and others.
What Pet Should I Get?	2015	Random House
A story written sometime between 1958 and 1962, featuring the same brother and sister from One Fish Two Fish Red Fish Blue Fish. Book manuscript and illustrations were rediscovered by Audrey Geisel in 2013. This Dr. Seuss book was later re-released in 2019 as a Beginner Book edition.
The Big Aqua Book of Beginner Books	2017	Random House
His work with others is included in this book.
Dr. Seuss's Book of Animals	2018	Random House
An easy-to-read book about animals appearing in other works by Dr. Seuss, illustrated with artwork from his books.
Dr. Seuss's Book of Colors	2018	Random House
An easy-to-read book about color, inspired by Dr. Seuss and illustrated with artwork from his books.
Dr. Seuss's 123	2019	Random House
This simple, rhymed riff about counting is illustrated with art from some of the most beloved works by Dr. Seuss.
Dr. Seuss's Horse Museum	2019	Random House
A horse leads a tour group of students through an art museum. Illustrated by Andrew Joyner.
The Big Violet Book of Beginner Books	2023	Random House
His work with others is included in this book.
Dr. Seuss's If You Think There's Nothing to Do	2024	Random House
Features the Cat in the Hat.
Sing the 50 United States!	2026	Penguin Random House
Based on a recovered manuscript, narrated by the Cat in the Hat. Illustrated in the style of Seuss by Tom Brannon. Released to coincide with the United States Semiquincentennial.

== Theo. LeSieg and Rosetta Stone ==
Geisel also authored several books under the pen name Theo. LeSieg (Geisel spelled backward) and one book under the name Rosetta Stone. These books were written but not illustrated by Geisel.

Title	Year	Illustrator
Ten Apples Up On Top!	1961	Roy McKie
Three anthropomorphic animals, a lion, a dog, and a tiger, who consistently pile apples on their heads for fun. This is the first Dr. Seuss book credited as one of his different names.
I Wish That I Had Duck Feet	1965	B Tobey
A boy wishes that he could have many different animal and mechanical body parts, finding fantastic uses for each, along with their problem areas.
Come over to My House	1966; 2016	Richard Erdoes; Katie Kath
The illustrations of this book portray the various styles of homes that kids from around the world live in.
The Eye Book	1968; 1999	Roy McKie; Joe Mathieu
This super-simple, super-sturdy board book edition of The Eye Book--Dr. Seuss's hilarious ode to eyes--gives little ones a whole new appreciation for all the wonderful things to be seen.
I Can Write! A Book by Me, Myself	1971	Roy McKie
This is the first Bright and Early Book special.
In a People House	1972	Roy McKie
A mouse shows a bird all the amazing things one can find in the everyday home.
Wacky Wednesday	1974	George Booth
Shows the adventures of a certain kid (the narrator) and how the kid learns to cope with an abnormal day.
The Many Mice of Mr. Brice a.k.a. The Pop-Up Mice of Mr. Brice	1974	Roy McKie
This sturdy, abridged board-book adaptation of Dr. Seuss's The Many Mice of Mr. Brice shows twenty-six mice in action, introducing the youngest readers to fun words and word play, from dancing and singing, to trombone playing and whisker growing.
Would You Rather Be a Bullfrog?	1975	Roy McKie
Poses questions for pondering: "Would you rather be a dog or be a cat?", "Would you rather live in igloos or in tents?", "Would you rather be a mermaid with a tail instead of feet?".
Because a Little Bug Went Ka-Choo!!	1975	Michael K. Frith
A bug sneezes, which sets off a series of larger and larger consequences, in the end nearly sending a whole town into chaos. Geisel wrote this book under the pen name Rosetta Stone.
Hooper Humperdink...? Not Him!	1976; 2006	Charles E. Martin; Scott Nash
A certain kid (the narrator) invites all his friends – whose names begin with all 26 letters of the alphabet - to a party at his house, except for Hooper Humperdink, but changes his mind as soon as the others are already having fun.
Please Try to Remember the First of Octember!	1977	Art Cummings
If someone wants a green kangaroo, a skateboard TV or a Jeep-a-Fly kite -- they must wait till the first of Octember. This delightful exercise in wish-fulfilment introduces children to the months of the year and the idea that they may not always get what they want.
Maybe You Should Fly a Jet! Maybe You Should Be a Vet!	1980; 2020	Michael J. Smollin; Kelly Kennedy
Exposes the reader to many different types of careers.
The Tooth Book	1981; 2000	Roy McKie; Joe Mathieu
Shows people and animals that have teeth, and ones that do not. Explains that they only get two sets of teeth, and briefly how to care for them. This is the final Dr. Seuss book credited as one of his different names, and the final Bright and Early Book written by Dr. Seuss.

== Works withdrawal from publication ==
On March 2, 2021, Seuss's birthday, Dr. Seuss Enterprises ceased publishing and licensing six Dr. Seuss books because of imagery they deemed racist and insensitive. The six books are And to Think That I Saw It on Mulberry Street, If I Ran the Zoo, McElligot's Pool, On Beyond Zebra!, Scrambled Eggs Super!, and The Cat's Quizzer.

The controversy dated back several years. The National Education Association's "Read Across America Day" moved away from Seuss's books and Seuss-themed activities in 2017, instead emphasizing works by and about people of color. Philip Nel of Kansas State University published Was the Cat in the Hat Black?: The Hidden Racism of Children's Literature, and the Need for Diverse Books in 2014, criticizing racial stereotypes in that and other Seuss books.

Many conservative media sources and public figures condemned the move, citing it as an example of cancel culture and literary censorship. The Wall Street Journal and National Review were among such critics, while Republican House Minority Leader Kevin McCarthy posted a video of him reading Green Eggs and Ham, in a reference to the news. Several non-conservative outlets also reacted negatively, with The Week referring to the move as "chilling".

The books' removal caused a surge in sales for other works by Seuss that impacted Amazon's charts in the United States. It was reported by CTV News that nine of the top ten best sellers were all books by Seuss, excluding the books that were removed. As the collectors value of the withdrawn books rose substantially, eBay also delisted the books.

== See also ==
- List of works based on Dr. Seuss stories
