= List of works based on Dr. Seuss stories =

Theodor Seuss Geisel, more commonly known as Dr. Seuss, was an American children's author, illustrator, animator, and cartoonist. He is known for his work writing and illustrating more than 60 books. His work includes many of the most popular children's books of all time, selling over 600 million copies and being translated into more than 20 languages by the time of his death.

== Theatrical ==
While Geisel was most famous for his literary works, he helped write several propaganda films, several cartoon shorts, and a feature-length film. Many of his literary works have also been adapted for the television and as feature-length films.

#	Title	Release date
1	'Neath the Bababa Tree	June 1, 1931
2	Put on the Spout	June 1, 1931
Series	Private Snafu	June 28, 1943–1946
3	Your Job in Germany	1945
4	Our Job in Japan	1945
5	Design for Death	1947
6	The 5,000 Fingers of Dr. T.	July 1, 1953

=== Theatrical short films ===
Year	Film	Format	Director	Writer	Distributor	Length	Budget	Ref(s)
1942	Horton Hatches the Egg	traditionally animated	Bob Clampett	Michael Maltese and Rich Hogan	Warner Bros. Pictures	10 min.	–	–
1943	The 500 Hats of Bartholomew Cubbins	stop motion	George Pal		Paramount Pictures	10 min.	–	–
1944	And to Think That I Saw It on Mulberry Street	stop motion	George Pal		Paramount Pictures	10 min.	–	–
1950	Gerald McBoing-Boing	traditionally animated	Robert Cannon	Phil Eastman and Bill Scott	UPA and Columbia Pictures	10 min.	–	–

=== Feature film adaptations ===
#	Title	Release date	Production company	Distributor(s)	Rotten Tomatoes	Budget	Gross
1	How the Grinch Stole Christmas	November 17, 2000	Imagine Entertainment	Universal Pictures	50%	$123 million	$345.1 million
2	The Cat in the Hat	November 21, 2003	Imagine Entertainment	Universal Pictures (United States and Canada); DreamWorks Pictures (International)	11%	$109 million	$133.9 million
3	Horton Hears a Who!	March 14, 2008	20th Century Fox Animation; Blue Sky Studios	20th Century Fox	80%	$85 million	$297.1 million
4	The Lorax	March 2, 2012	Illumination	Universal Pictures	53%	$70 million	$348.8 million
5	The Grinch	November 9, 2018	Illumination	Universal Pictures	60%	$75 million	$540 million
6	The Mean One	December 9, 2022	Sleight of Hand Productions; Amy Rose Productions; Kali Pictures	Atlas Film Distribution	22%	—N/a	$612,260
7	The Cat in the Hat	November 6, 2026	Warner Bros. Pictures Animation	Warner Bros. Pictures	—N/a	—N/a	—N/a
8	Oh, the Places You'll Go!	March 17, 2028	Warner Bros. Pictures Animation	Warner Bros. Pictures	—N/a	—N/a	—N/a
9	Thing One and Thing Two	TBA	Warner Bros. Pictures Animation	Warner Bros. Pictures	—N/a	—N/a	—N/a

=== Musicals ===
#	Title	First production year	Music	Lyrics
1	Dr. Seuss' How the Grinch Stole Christmas! The Musical	1994	Mel Marvin	Timothy Mason
2	Seussical	2000	Stephen Flaherty	Lynn Ahrens
3	The Lorax	2018	Charlie Fink	Charlie Fink

== Television ==
=== Specials ===
#	Title	Release date	Director	Studio	Network
1	How the Grinch Stole Christmas!	December 18, 1966	Chuck Jones	MGM Animation/Visual Arts	CBS
2	Horton Hears a Who!	March 19, 1970	Chuck Jones	MGM Animation/Visual Arts	CBS
3	The Cat in the Hat	March 10, 1971	Hawley Pratt	DePatie-Freleng	CBS
4	The Lorax	February 14, 1972	Hawley Pratt	DePatie-Freleng	CBS
5	Dr. Seuss on the Loose (Consists of three shorts: The Sneetches, The Zax, and Green Eggs and Ham)	October 15, 1973	Hawley Pratt	DePatie-Freleng	CBS
6	The Hoober-Bloob Highway	February 19, 1975	Alan Zaslove	DePatie-Freleng	CBS
7	Halloween Is Grinch Night	October 29, 1977	Gerard Baldwin	DePatie-Freleng	ABC
8	Pontoffel Pock, Where Are You?	May 2, 1980	Gerard Baldwin	DePatie-Freleng	ABC
9	The Grinch Grinches the Cat in the Hat	May 20, 1982	Bill Perez	Marvel Productions	ABC
10	The Butter Battle Book (final TV special aired in Dr. Seuss's lifetime)	November 13, 1989	Ralph Bakshi	Bakshi Animation	TNT
11	In Search of Dr. Seuss	November 6, 1994	Vincent Patterson	Turner Home Entertainment	TNT
12	Daisy-Head Mayzie	February 5, 1995	Tony Collingwood	Hanna-Barbera; Tony Collingwood Productions	TNT
13	Dr. Seuss's The Sneetches	November 3, 2025	Bronagh O'Hanlon	Dr. Seuss Enterprises; Brown Bag Films; Netflix	Netflix
14	Thidwick the Big-Hearted Moose	TBA	TBA	Dr. Seuss Enterprises; Brown Bag Films; Netflix	Netflix

=== Series ===
#	Title	Premiere date	End date	Network
1	The Gerald McBoing-Boing Show (only TV series aired in Dr. Seuss's lifetime)	December 16, 1956	March 10, 1957	CBS
2	The Wubbulous World of Dr. Seuss	October 13, 1996	May 15, 1998	Nickelodeon
3	Gerald McBoing-Boing	August 22, 2005	November 28, 2007	Cartoon Network (US); Teletoon (Canada)
4	The Cat in the Hat Knows a Lot About That!	September 6, 2010	October 14, 2018	PBS Kids (US); CITV/Tiny Pop (UK); Treehouse TV/CBC Kids (Canada)
5	Green Eggs and Ham	November 8, 2019	April 8, 2022	Netflix
6	Dr. Seuss's Red Fish, Blue Fish	September 8, 2025	TBA	Netflix
7	Dr. Seuss's Horton!	October 7, 2025	TBA	Netflix
8	Wacky Wednesday	TBA	TBA	Netflix

== Direct-to-video ==
This Dr. Seuss collection was a series released by Random House. They are a video version of a "book on tape". None of these productions are animated. This section does not contain duplicate entries. While Horton Hatches The Egg, How The Grinch Stole Christmas, Horton Hears a Who, The Cat in the Hat, Green Eggs and Ham, and Because A Little Bug Went Ka-Choo! were adapted into full animation, they were also adapted into a non-animated production for this Dr. Seuss collection.

=== Dr. Seuss Beginner Book Video ===
- Dr. Seuss's ABC plus I Can Read with My Eyes Shut! and Mr. Brown Can Moo! Can You?
- Hop on Pop plus Oh Say Can You Say? and Marvin K. Mooney Will You Please Go Now!
- One Fish, Two Fish, Red Fish, Blue Fish plus Oh, the Thinks You Can Think! and The Foot Book
- The Cat in the Hat Comes Back plus Fox in Socks and There's a Wocket in My Pocket!
- I Am Not Going to Get Up Today! plus The Shape of Me and Other Stuff, Great Day for Up! and In a People House
- 2 Dr. Seuss Favorites: Green Eggs and Ham and The Cat in the Hat
- The Cat in the Hat plus Maybe You Should Fly a Jet! Maybe You Should Be a Vet!
- Green Eggs and Ham plus The Tooth Book and Ten Apples Up On Top!

=== Dr. Seuss Video Classics ===
- Circus Classics/Horton Hatches the Egg (narrated by Billy Crystal) plus If I Ran the Circus
- Treasury Classics/Yertle the Turtle and Other Stories (narrated by John Lithgow)
- Holiday Classics/How the Grinch Stole Christmas! (narrated by Walter Matthau) plus If I Ran the Zoo
- Big Animal Classics/Horton Hears a Who! (narrated by Dustin Hoffman) plus Thidwick the Big-Hearted Moose
- Lucky Classics/Did I Ever Tell You How Lucky You Are? (narrated by John Cleese) plus Scrambled Eggs Super!
- Bedtime Classics/Dr. Seuss's Sleep Book (narrated by Madeline Kahn) plus Hunches in Bunches

=== Other ===
- Notes Alive! Dr. Seuss's My Many Colored Days (1998)
- Read with Me DVD! Green Eggs and Ham (2005)

== Video games ==
- Dr. Seuss' Fix-Up the Mix-Up Puzzler (1984)
- Dr. Seuss's ABC (1995)
- Green Eggs and Ham (1996)
- The Cat in the Hat (1997)
- Dr. Seuss Toddler (1999)
- Dr. Seuss Preschool (1999)
- Dr. Seuss Kindergarten (1999)
- Dr. Seuss Reading (1999)
- The Grinch (2000) – Game Boy Color
- The Grinch (2000) – PlayStation, Dreamcast, Windows
- Green Eggs and Ham (2003)
- The Cat in the Hat (2003) - PS2, Xbox
  - The Cat in the Hat (2003) - Game Boy Advance
- The Cat in the Hat (2005)
- How the Grinch Stole Christmas! (2007) – Nintendo DS
- The Grinch: Christmas Adventures (2023)

== See also ==
- Dr. Seuss bibliography
