= Fox in Socks =

1965 children's book by Dr. Seuss

- Author: Dr. Seuss
- Illustrator: Dr. Seuss
- Cover artist: Dr. Seuss
- Language: English
- Genre: Children's literature
- Publisher: Random House
- Publication date: January 12, 1965
- Publication place: United States
- Media type: Print (hardcover and paperback)
- ISBN: 978-0-39-490038-4
- OCLC: 304375
- Preceded by: Hop on Pop
- Followed by: I Had Trouble in Getting to Solla Sollew

Fox in Socks is a children's book by Theodor Seuss Geisel under the pen name Dr. Seuss. It was published by Random House on January 12, 1965. The book features an anthropomorphic red fox named Mr. Fox as he tries to convince Mr. Knox to repeat tongue twisters about the things happening around them while Knox becomes increasingly frustrated with Fox's efforts. The wording of Fox in Socks emphasizes the sounds and structure of the words more than their intended meanings, leading the book to include many nonsense phrases and complex arrangements of similar-sounding words. Geisel was working on Fox in Socks when he met his future wife Audrey Dimond, and found she was able to repeat the tongue twisters that others could not. In 2001, Fox in Socks was listed as the 31st best-selling hardcover children's book in the United States.

== Summary ==
Fox in Socks begins with a note that the book is dangerous and should be read slowly. It then introduces Fox and Knox, who interact with socks and a box. Fox sees chicks with bricks, blocks, and clocks. He suggests that he and Knox do tricks with them, and he stacks them in different arrangements while speaking in rhyme. Knox complains that his tongue cannot manage the rhymes that Fox is asking him to say. Fox tries a new rhyme about Sue and Slow Joe Crow sewing, but this too frustrates Knox. Fox then rhymes about chewing goo with a Goo-Goose, but Knox refuses to chew the goo or repeat the rhyme.

Fox rhymes about Ben and Bim fighting with brooms and accompanying a pig band, but this further upsets Knox. Knox also rejects Fox's rhyme about Luke Luck and his duck licking a lake, then about fleas, cheese trees, and a freezy breeze. When Fox describes tweetle beetles battling with paddles in a bottle on a poodle eating noodles, Knox expresses his anger by shoving Fox into the bottle and giving his own rhyming description of Fox's predicament. Knox then leaves, thanking Fox for the fun. The book ends with another note asking whether the reader's tongue is numb.

== Writing and publication ==
Fox in Socks was written by Theodor Seuss Geisel, using his pen name Dr. Seuss. He wrote the book through most of 1964, also working on I Had Trouble in Getting to Solla Sollew at the same time. Geisel met Audrey Dimond while he was working on Fox in Socks, and she was the only one of the adults who could read the tongue twisters aloud. He married Dimond in 1968.

The main characters Geisel created for Fox in Socks are Mr. Knox and Mr. Fox, also called Mr. Socks Fox. Other named characters include Ben and Bim, Luke Luck, Slow Joe Crow, and Sue. They are accompanied by several animals, including chicks, a duck, pigs, a poodle, and fictional animals Goo-Goose and tweetle beetles.

To test his editor Bennett Cerf, Geisel added the inappropriate line "Moe blows Joe's nose, Joe blows Moe's nose" to his manuscript of Fox in Socks. This followed a similar incident two years prior when he added the word "contraceptive" to his manuscript of Hop on Pop. Fox in Socks was published by Random House on January 12, 1965, as part of its Beginner Books series. Geisel dedicated the book to Audrey Dimond and Mitzi Long, describing them as members of the Mt. Soledad Lingual Laboratories despite no such place existing.

== Analysis ==
Fox in Socks was one of two tongue twister books written by Dr. Seuss, alongside Oh Say Can You Say? (1979). When writing Fox in Socks, Geisel prioritized the sound and structure of the tongue twisters over coherence, resulting in heavy use of nonsensical phrases. In one instance, Fox in Socks describes a "tweetle beetle noodle poodle bottled paddled muddled duddled fuddled wuddled fox in socks". Such phrases retain appropriate word order. When describing a "tweetle beetle puddle paddle battle", Geisel couples paddle and battle to describe a "paddle battle" within the larger phrase. The word puddle then describes the setting of the battle, and tweetle beetle adds a descriptor for the type of "puddle paddle battle". The rhymes are accompanied by a challenge on the front cover for readers to "read aloud to find out just how smart your tongue is". In the story, Mr. Knox describes the tongue twisters as "blibber blubber".

Fox in Socks presents readers with the change of words' meanings in different contexts. This includes how a list of stacked items is harmless when stacked on the ground, but that they indicate a negative consequence when stacked on a character's head. The book expresses a common Seuss theme of optimism. The phrase "you can make" appears as a refrain at the beginning of several sentences. It also features Seuss's respect for manners, having Mr. Knox refer to the Fox as "Mr. Fox, sir". Like many books by Dr. Seuss, Fox in Socks includes joyous feasting, in this case portrayed with the Gooey Gluey Blue Goo being chewed on by the Goo-Goose. Philosophy professor Sharon Kaye comments on the relationship of the characters Sue and Slow Joe Crow, suggesting they are an example of a friendship of utility as described by Aristotle, as they have little in common but both benefit from sewing one another's clothes.

The book is one of several by Dr. Seuss in which younger characters teach older ones, along with books like Horton Hatches the Egg (1940), Green Eggs and Ham (1960), and Hop on Pop (1963). In this case, Mr. Fox is more skilled with tongue twisters and tries to instruct Mr. Knox. The end of the book subverts this theme when Mr. Knox grows frustrated with Mr. Fox and strikes back at him. Literary scholar Philip Nel likened this to the moral of Sam and the Firefly by P. D. Eastman and Geisel's earlier Private Snafu cartoons, which teach that knowledge should not be flaunted or abused. Nel considered Fox in Socks to be an example of a book that is avant-garde for adults but not for children. Under his reasoning, the deconstruction of language present in the book only works for those familiar with more typical linguistic structure, but young children lack the literary experience to be confused by this. Conversely, adults will expect the simple words to be easily read and be taken by surprise. A child will read the tongue twisters more carefully than adults, causing the book to be easier for children in a relative sense.

Children's literature professor David Rudd likened the use of words' construction in Fox in Socks to its contemporaries The Wonderful O by James Thurber and The Phantom Tollbooth by Norton Juster. He described these works as successors of Lewis Carroll and Edward Lear in the genre of literary nonsense.

== Reception and legacy ==
Fox in Socks ranked 31st in a 2001 list of best-selling children's hardcover books in the United States by Publishers Weekly and was the 8th best-selling book by Dr. Seuss. By this time, it had sold over three million copies. The Oxford Companion to the English Language (1992) cites fourteen lines of Fox in Socks in its coverage of "compounds in context".

Kirkus Reviews considered Fox in Socks an "amusing exercise for beginning readers" as it requires focus on each word, but it said that the tongue twisters made little sense when removed from the context of their illustrations. Roderick Nordell wrote for the Christian Science Monitor that the book is sufficiently enjoyable to read that it encourages children to work with more challenging material. However, Donald Barr of Book Week criticized the book for being charmless and unnecessarily elaborate.

Journalist Jonathan Cott listed Fox in Socks among Dr. Seuss's best examples of books that balance entertainment with educational value. Children's literature professor Francelia Butler praised the book as having the best examples of Geisel's nonsense rhymes.
