= Berton Braley =

American writer

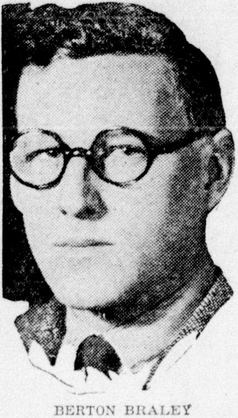
Berton Braley ca 1923

Berton Braley (January 29, 1882 – January 23, 1966) was an American poet. His best-known poem is "The Will to Win", written in a motivational tone.

== Life and work ==
Braley was born in Madison, Wisconsin. His father, Arthur B. Braley, was a judge; he died when Berton Braley was seven years old. At 16, Braley quit high school and got a job working as a factory hand at a plow plant. After a few years, Braley went back to school and received his high school diploma. Shortly thereafter he discovered Tom Hood's poetry instructional book The Rhymester. He spent some time after 1905 living in Butte, Montana, working as a staff journalist on the Butte Evening News (published 1905–1911).

Braley was first published at the age of 11 when a small publication printed a fairy tale he wrote. He was a prolific writer, with verses in many magazines, including Coal Age, American Machinist, Nation's Business, Forbes magazine, Harper's Magazine, Atlantic Monthly, and the Saturday Evening Post. His work appeared in numerous pulp magazines, including Adventure, Breezy Stories, Complete Stories, The Popular Magazine, Short Stories and Snappy Stories. He published twenty books, about half of them being poetry collections.

His poetry was given national newspaper syndication, including some that were serialized with cartoon illustrations by Virginia Huget for newspaper Sunday color sections.

In 1917, John Philip Sousa composed a marching song for the University of Wisconsin, titled Wisconsin Forward Forever with lyrics by Berton Braley. In 1934, Braley published the autobiographical Pegasus Pulls a Hack: Memoirs of a Modern Minstrel.

His poem "Do It Now" became widely reprinted after 1915. The poem begins:

If with pleasure you are viewing any work a man is doing, If you like him or you love him, tell him now.

The poem was also set as a hymn in Presbyterian hymnbooks and sung by glee clubs.

His other popular poems include "Start where you stand"

== Selected list of works ==
Braley was a prolific author of poems, prose, plays, and humorous non-fiction articles

- Sonnets of a Freshman (1904). Illustrated by C. R. Freeman. Madison, WI: Wisconsin State Journal.
- The Oracle on Smoke: being a few utterances in a simple and not at all delphic style, with certain so-called poems there among scattered (1905). Madison, WI: The Sphinx, printed by the Parsons Printery. (Slim volume on tobacco smoking)
- Thoughtful Captain Jenkins, illustrated by Reginald Birch. The Century Magazine, March 1912, pp. 796–7
- Sonnets of a Suffragette (1913). Chicago: Browne & Howell Company
- Songs of the Workaday World (1915). New York: George H. Doran Company
- Things As They Are (1916). New York: George H. Doran Company
- A Banjo at Armageddon (1917). New York: George H. Doran Company
- In Camp and Trench: Songs of the Fighting Forces (1918). New York: George H. Doran Company
- Buddy Ballads: Songs of the A.E.F. (1919). New York: George H. Doran Company
- The Sheriff Of Silver Bow (1921). New York: Jacobsen Publishing Co. (Short stories)
- Hurdy-Gurdy on Olympus (1927). Illustrated by D'Alton Valentine. New York, London: D. Appleton and Co.
- The World's One Thousand Best Poems (10 volumes) (1929) (as editor-in-chief). New York: Funk & Wagnalls Company. (Encrypted text, needs key from US National Library Service)
- Pegasus Pulls a Hack : Memoirs of a Modern Minstrel (1934). New York: Minton, Balch & Company. (Autobiography)
- Morgan sails the Caribbean (1934). New York: Macmillan. (Verse. Includes incidents from The Cup of Gold by John Steinbeck)
- New Deal Ditties; or, Running in the red with Roosevelt (1936). New York: Greenberg

== Poetry collections ==
- Abrams, Linda Tania (editor). Virtues in Verse: The Best of Berton Braley. California, The Atlantean Press. 1993.start where you stand ISBN 0-9626854-3-7.
