= The Cat in the Hat Comes Back =

1958 book by Dr. Seuss

- Front cover
- Author: Dr. Seuss
- Illustrator: Dr. Seuss
- Language: English
- Genre: Children's literature
- Publisher: Random House
- Publication date: September 12, 1958 (renewed in 1986)
- Publication place: United States
- Media type: Print (hardcover and paperback)
- Preceded by: How the Grinch Stole Christmas! The Cat in the Hat (plot wise)
- Followed by: Yertle the Turtle and Other Stories

The Cat in the Hat Comes Back is a 1958 children's book written and illustrated by American author Theodor Geisel under his pen name Dr. Seuss. Published by Random House as one of its five original Beginner Books, it is the sequel to The Cat in the Hat (1957). In the book, the Cat in the Hat leaves a pink stain in the bathtub and spreads it around the house while cleaning it. He unveils a series of increasingly small cats from beneath his hat until the smallest one lifts his hat and unleashes a force called Voom that cleans away the pink stain. The book uses under 300 distinct words with a plot inspired by Geisel's earlier story "The Strange Shirt Spot" (1951). It reuses several aspects of The Cat in the Hat, such as poor weather preventing the children from playing and the absence of an adult figure. The children are quicker to confront the Cat compared to the first book, and the character of Sally engages more with other characters instead of staying silent.

The Cat in the Hat Comes Back was well-received, but did not garner as much critical praise as the original book. A live-action film adaptation was planned, but was ultimately canceled after the critical failure of the 2003 Cat in the Hat film.

== Plot ==
A boy and his sister Sally are shoveling snow while their mother is out. The Cat in the Hat arrives, and Sally reminds her brother about the tricks the Cat played during his last visit. The Cat promises he only wants to go inside to get out of the snow, but they find him eating cake in a bathtub. The boy turns off the water, but a pink stain is left along the side of the bathtub. The Cat uses their mother's dress to clean it, staining the dress pink. The Cat tries various methods to clean the pink spot, wiping it onto a wall, their father's shoes, a rug, and a bed.

To get help cleaning the stain from the bed, the Cat lifts his hat and a smaller version of himself, Little Cat A, comes out. Little Cat A lifts his hat to let out a smaller cat, Little Cat B, who then lifts his hat to let out Little Cat C. They move the pink spot to a broom and a television set before blowing it out of the house with a fan. It stains the snow, so Little Cat C takes off his hat to let out Little Cats D through G. They try to clean up the snow, but make a bigger mess of the pink spot, so they let out Little Cats H through V, each smaller than the last. They try to clean up the stain until all of the snow is pink, so they let out Little Cats W, X, Y, and the microscopic Little Cat Z. Little Cat Z lifts his hat to let out the Voom, a powerful, mysterious, and unseen force hidden under it which cleans the pink from the snow and puts the Little Cats back in the Cat's hat.

== Writing and publication ==
The Cat in the Hat Comes Back is a sequel to the book The Cat in the Hat by Theodor Geisel. He did not wish to write a sequel, especially as he was more focused on his work running the Beginner Books imprint, but there was an unspoken implication from his publisher that a sequel was expected for such a popular book. Geisel wrote The Cat in the Hat Comes Back at his home in La Jolla, California. He incorporated elements of his short story "The Strange Shirt Spot" (1951) when writing The Cat in the Hat Comes Back. The images of the Cat in the bathtub are reminiscent of his political cartoons from the early-1940s which feature vulnerable characters in bathtubs. Geisel discarded six drafts of possible sequels for The Cat in the Hat before settling on what became The Cat in the Hat Comes Back. Little of his draft work was preserved, with no existing color-pencil sketches.

Geisel drew from a list of 348 words, selecting them from a list of words appropriate for early readers with the exception of Voom. Depending on how a distinct word is defined, the final draft uses 253, 266, or 290 words. (Note: Warren T. Greenleaf gives the number 253. Philip Nel gives the number 266 if individual letters, numbers and symbols besides A and I are excluded, or 290 if they are included.) There are only four three-syllable words in The Cat in the Hat Comes Back: anything, somebodies, somebody, and W. Another 26 words were two-syllables. (Note: The two-syllable words in The Cat in the Hat Comes Back are about, after, again, alone, away, bedroom, before, clever, eating, ever, happy, hurry, into, little, mother, mother's, never, over, Sally, today, T.V., very, water, working, and $.) The most common words are the with 87 uses followed by and and cat with 54 uses each. While no words beginning with Q or Z appear in The Cat in the Hat, The Cat in the Hat Comes Back features the letters as standalone names of two characters along with the other letters.

The Cat in the Hat Comes Back was published in 1958. It was one of the original five books published in the Beginner Books line, along with A Big Ball of String by Marion Holland, The Big Jump and Other Stories by Benjamin Elkin and Katherine Evans, A Fly Went By by Michael McClintock, and Sam and the Firefly by P. D. Eastman. Geisel's book was the most popular of the group. He immediately began working on Yertle the Turtle and Other Stories while The Cat in the Hat Comes Back was prepared for publication. To promote the two books, Geisel went on a book tour, which was an unusual marketing strategy for children's books at the time.

The Cat in the Hat Comes Back was the first of Geisel's books to feature the "I can read it all by myself" logo of the Beginner Books series, which was then added to future printings of The Cat in the Hat. The original cover art featured an image on page six where the Cat walks up a snowy hill, but it was tilted so that the Cat appeared to walk on level ground. This design had the title printed in blue text, used the original Beginner Books logo, and erroneously had the Cat wearing a white bowtie instead of a red one. After it had already sold 100,000 copies, Geisel decided that a line on the cover was drawn too dark and that a new cover needed to be printed. Subsequent editions used a solid blue background and the updated Beginner Books logo, which itself featured the Cat. Seuss was unhappy with the first printing, feeling that the colors bled too much in some places and that the black lines were not crisp enough. Geisel made use of S-shaped curves throughout the book, including the Cat's path when skiing, the rug as it is moved, and the tails of the little cats. The title page of The Cat in the Hat Comes Back includes an exclamation point in the title, but the cover does not. This contrasts with On Beyond Zebra! and How the Grinch Stole Christmas!, where exclamation points appeared on the cover but were omitted on the title page.

== Literary analysis ==
The Cat in the Hat Comes Back mirrors and contrasts with its predecessor. Both take place at the same house, but the first takes place entirely indoors on a rainy day while the second moves in and out of the house on a snowy day. Like the original, The Cat in the Hat Comes Back begins with the children unable to play, but it is because they are busy shoveling snow outside instead of rain keeping them inside. The Cat's tone shifts from one of carelessness in the first book, saying that their mother will not mind his antics, to deception as he tells the children their parents will never know of his actions. The plot of The Cat in the Hat Comes Back is dependent on the absence of an adult figure—a common theme in Dr. Seuss books, including its predecessor The Cat in the Hat. The two children are more alert to chaos caused by the Cat in The Cat in the Hat Comes Back relative to the original, telling him off immediately instead of waiting until the end of the book. Sally takes on what would be the mother's role, warning the narrator about the Cat. Here she replaces the Fish, who played this role in the first book. This deviates from the first book, in which Sally was a silent observer. The Cat's possession of hats underneath his hat is reminiscent of Geisel's earlier book The 500 Hats of Bartholomew Cubbins (1938), which centers on this premise.

The Cat in the Hat Comes Back teaches the letters of the alphabet. This foreshadows one of Geisel's later books, Dr. Seuss's ABC, which also demonstrates the alphabet in a whimsical fashion. English professor George R. Bodmer categorizes these, along with Geisel's On Beyond Zebra! (1955), as examples of "anti-alphabet" books. The Cat in the Hat Comes Back explores how different spellings can produce the same sounds with the words "news", "shoes", "use", and "whose". Geisel used the removal of the spot from various objects to add several nouns into the book, borrowing the technique from the first book where the cat juggles several objects.

Children's literature professor Philip Nel noted the frequent refrain of "work to be done" in The Cat in the Hat Comes Back and suggested that it came from Geisel's own beliefs about hard work. Nel said descriptions of the Cat's mischief in The Cat in the Hat Comes Back were drawn from a passage in The Bad Child's Book of Beasts (1896) by Hilaire Belloc, whom Geisel described as an influence on his work. Literature professor Lois Einhorn cited the Cat's return and the title of the book as an example of circularity found in the works of Dr. Seuss that represent unity and cycles of change, as well as his plot structure of order, disorder, and then return to order.

The nature of Voom is not described in the book and has been central to analyses of the book's meaning. The Red Scare was underway when Geisel wrote The Cat in the Hat Comes Back, and academics such as Robert Coover, Louis Menand, and Philip Nel have compared the pink spots to communism, either in the context of the Cat spreading communism or using the Voom as an atomic weapon to destroy it.

Feminist professor Naomi Goldenberg suggested that the Cat removing the spot from their father's bed was analogous to removing their mother's role in their conception, and the creation of his own little cats as putting men's production of language above women's birth of children. Engineer Akhlesh Lakhtakia suggested that the small cats are an example of fractals, but mathematician Michael Frame challenged this because each layer has only a single new iteration of the cat and instead likened them to Matryoshka dolls. As one of several examples of physically small characters making the most difference in his stories, Geisel depicts Z, the smallest character in the book, as the one with the solution that resolves the story.

Geisel incorporated a conversational tone into The Cat in the Hat Comes Back. He used contractions and exclamations, and he spoke directly to the reader with the phrase "Now, don't ask me what Voom is, I never will know." The picture of the Cat entering the home uses its composition to build tension. The children are drawn at a distance from the Cat as he enters so that it is a greater challenge to stop him, and Sally's shovel is positioned in a way that snow is about to drop from it onto her head. The mother and father have separate bedrooms in the characters' home, which drew from how couples in television sitcoms were portrayed at the time of publication. The father has a double bed with a blue headboard, while the first book shows the mother has a single bed with a pink headboard. The Cat in the Hat Comes Back is the first of Geisel's children's books to depict a television set, corresponding with the increasing popularity of television at the time.

An earlier draft of the book had the little cats act as extensions of the original Cat, repeating what he says. Geisel changed this by having the little cats say they would think on the issue, implying independence from the Cat. The little cats are quicker to express their mischievous nature as well, with a draft showing them leap over Sally's head out the door before they begin playing in the snow. One of the playing cats uses a device identical to the FLIT insecticide for which Geisel had created a popular advertising campaign in 1928. The scene escalates as it goes on, with the white snow turning entirely pink, a smiling snowman adopting a frowning face as it is destroyed, and a bird being almost entirely covered in the pink snow. The bird becomes happy again after the snow is cleaned, presenting a common technique of Geisel's to have silent observers indicate the emotional tone of the scene. The imagery of the cats playing in the snow draws from The Brownies as drawn by Palmer Cox.

== Reception and legacy ==
The Cat in the Hat Comes Back was positively received. Critics viewed it as an excellent book for early readers, though it was considered slightly inferior to the first. Booklist and E.C. Mann of The Chicago Sunday Tribune celebrated the book for its humor. The New York Herald Tribune praised both its humor and its rhythm, complimenting how it combined this with a simple vocabulary. Warren T. Greenleaf of the National Association of Elementary School Principles said that The Cat in the Hat Comes Back is among Geisel's strongest books in terms of plot structure. Ellen Lewis Buell of The New York Times commented positively on how the action builds throughout the story. Literature professor Donald E. Pease criticized the book as a rehash of The Cat in the Hat. Geisel himself felt that it was not as good as the original. A list published by The New York Times placed The Cat in the Hat Comes Back as the 7th best-selling children's book in the year of its release. The Cat in the Hat Comes Back ranked 26th in a 2001 list by Publishers Weekly of all-time best-selling children's hardcover books in the United States. It was the 7th best-selling book by Dr. Seuss on this list.

Although the Cat indicates he may return again at the end of the story, Geisel never wrote a sequel to The Cat in the Hat Comes Back. Instead, the Cat was used in a variety of other projects such as The Cat in the Hat Songbook (1967), The Cat's Quizzer (1976), and I Can Read with My Eyes Shut! (1978), as well as adaptations of Seuss's characters in other media. The song "The Sidewinder Sleeps Tonite" (1992) by R.E.M. references The Cat in the Hat Comes Back with the line "The Cat in the Hat came back, wrecked a lot of havoc on the way, always had a smile and a reason to pretend". A live-action film adaptation of The Cat in the Hat Comes Back was planned as a sequel to the 2003 film, but after the first film got bad reviews from critics and didn't do very well at the box office, Geisel's widow Audrey decided not to allow any more live-action film adaptations of her husband's works, causing the planned sequel to be cancelled.
