= Great Day for Up! =

1974 book by Dr. Seuss

- Author: Dr. Seuss
- Illustrator: Quentin Blake
- Language: English
- Publisher: Random House
- Publication date: August 28, 1974
- Publication place: United States
- Media type: Print (hardcover and paperback)
- ISBN: 9780394829135
- Preceded by: There's a Wocket in My Pocket!
- Followed by: Oh, the Thinks You Can Think!

Great Day for Up! is a children's book written by Dr. Seuss and illustrated by Quentin Blake. It was published by Random House on August 28, 1974. It is the first book credited to Seuss not illustrated by the author himself, though Seuss had previously collaborated with illustrators on other books under the pen name Theo LeSieg.

== Plot ==
The narrator says that today is a good day for things to go up. As more things are described as getting up, at the very end, the narrator is revealed to be a boy who does not want to get up and wants to sleep in. This ending would later be expanded into I Am Not Going to Get Up Today!.

== See also ==
- List of Dr. Seuss books
