= I Had Trouble in Getting to Solla Sollew =

Children's book by Dr. Seuss

- Author: Dr. Seuss
- Illustrator: Dr. Seuss
- Language: English
- Genre: Children's literature
- Publisher: Random House
- Publication date: August 12, 1965 (renewed in 1993)
- Publication place: United States
- Media type: Print (hardcover and paperback)
- OCLC: 1425583
- Preceded by: Fox in Socks
- Followed by: The Cat in the Hat Song Book

I Had Trouble in Getting to Solla Sollew is a 1965 children's book by Dr. Seuss. The story features classic Seuss rhymes and drawings in his distinctive pen and ink style.

== Plot ==
The young protagonist lives a happy and carefree life before tripping over a rock one day and being bitten and stung by various creatures. A passing traveler says that he is bound for Solla Sollew, a city of "very few" troubles, so the protagonist joins him. The journey itself is beset by many more troubles, including a draft animal that falls sick, a bus that breaks down, a flood, and a general who conscripts the protagonist into his army. The army retreats during battle, leaving the protagonist alone against a pack of wild Poozers. Escaping into a dark tunnel, the protagonist finally reaches an exit door that opens near Solla Sollew.

The protagonist discovers that Solla Sollew is surrounded by a wall with only one door. The doorman explains that there is only a single trouble with Solla Sollew, which is that the door cannot be opened due to a Key-Slapping Slippard that recently nested in the key hole, preventing anyone from getting into the city. Since the city no longer needs a doorman, he has decided to set off for Boola Boo Ball, another untroubled city that he has heard about, and he offers to take the protagonist with him. The protagonist declines, reasoning that avoiding troubles only led to worse ones, and instead returns home, determined to face troubles rather than run away from them.

== In Seussical ==
In Seussical, Solla Sollew is the subject of a song in which the main characters yearn for a happy resolution to their problems. It is referred to as "a faraway land, so the stories all tell / somewhere beyond the horizon". It is said that "troubles there are few" and that "maybe it's something like heaven".

Solla Sollew is described as a place of hope and wonder, where "breezes are warm" and "people are kind". The characters seek to find this place, where they believe they will find each other and be happy. However, they cannot ever find it, saying in the song "when I get close, it disappears".

== See also ==
- Bildungsroman
