= There's a Wocket in My Pocket! =

Book by Dr. Seuss

- Author: Dr. Seuss
- Illustrator: Dr. Seuss
- Language: English
- Genre: Children's literature
- Publisher: Random House
- Publication date: August 12, 1974 (renewed in 2002)
- Publication place: United States
- Media type: Print (hardcover and paperback)
- Preceded by: Did I Ever Tell You How Lucky You Are?
- Followed by: Oh, the Thinks You Can Think!

There's a Wocket in My Pocket! is a short children's book by Dr. Seuss, published by Random House in 1974. It features a little boy talking about the strange creatures that live in his house whose names rhyme with their specific locations, such as the "yeps" on the steps and the "nooth grush" on his toothbrush.

== Summary ==
A boy walks through his house, speculating that different creatures live behind each object. He describes creatures that he likes, such as the Yot in the pot, the Zable on the table, the Ghair under the chair, Nink in Sink, some Nupboards in cupboards, some Yeps on steps through the stairway, and the Zillow on the pillow. He also describes creatures that he doesn't like, such as the Yottle in the bottle, the Bofa on the sofa, the Nooth Grush on his toothbrush, the Vug underneath the rug, the Quimney up the chimney, and the Zall past the hall. He thinks of many more creatures whom he considers his friends, and he expresses gratitude for the home he lives in.

== Writing ==
There's a Wocket in my Pocket! is one of the Dr. Seuss books that depends on nonce words. Seuss constructed each rhyme to pair one English word and one nonce word. The nonce words are contrasted from the English words with a substitution of the initial phoneme. The book's exploration of the house teaches readers about the names for common household objects. The creatures in the book are reminiscent of those in other Dr. Seuss books.

The Vug under the rug was originally intended to be the Uug under the rug, but secretary Claudia Prescott misread the U as a V when transcribing the book, and Seuss decided that he preferred her version.

Along with Great Day for Up!, There's a Wocket in My Pocket! was the final book that Seuss wrote for the Beginner Books series before he reduced his involvement with the imprint, handing over editorial control to Walter Retan.

== Analysis and reception ==
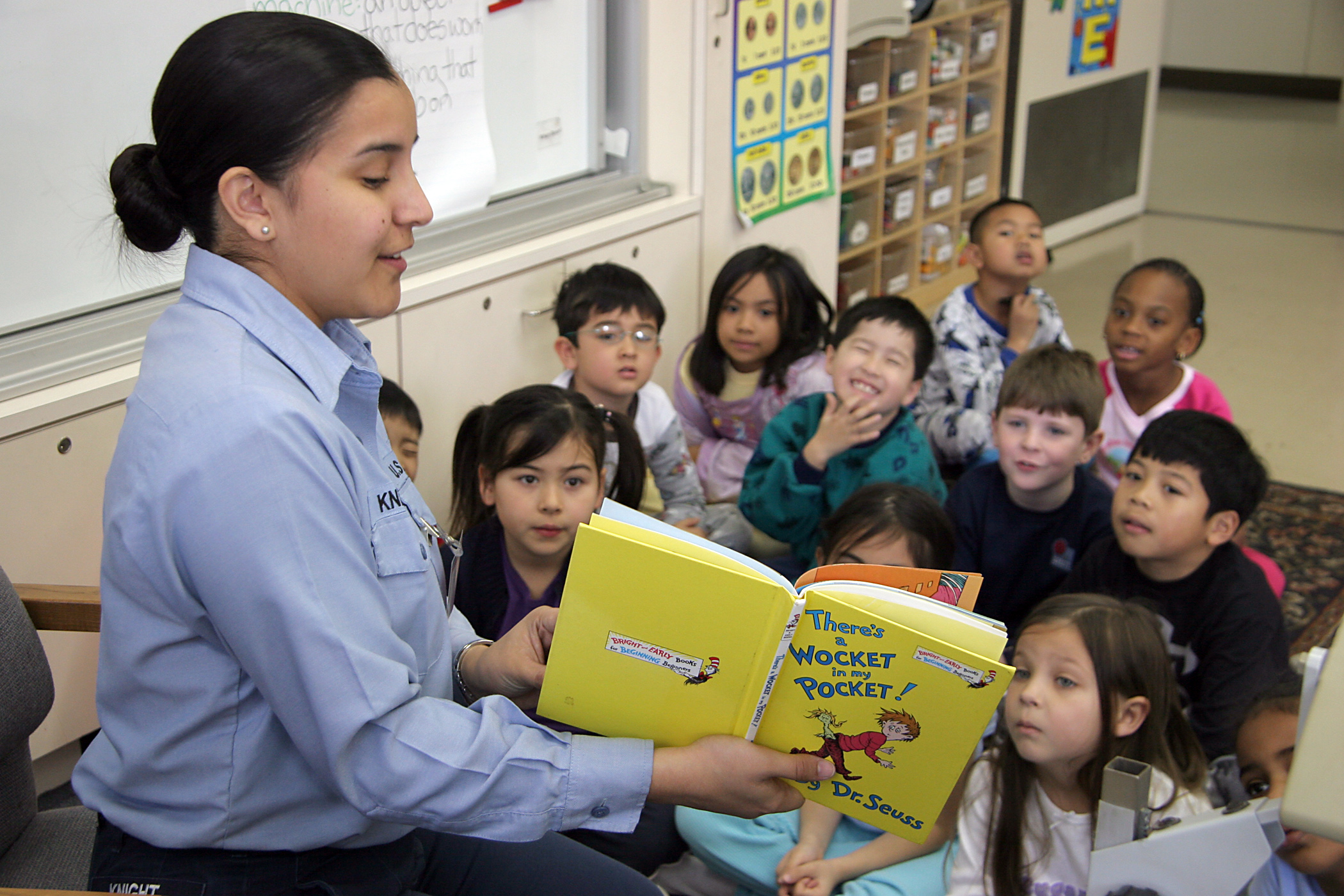
A yeoman of the U.S. Navy reading to a 1st grade class

Jonathan Cott cited There's a Wocket in My Pocket! as an example of Seuss's ability to produce "remarkable animal creations". A reviewer for the School Library Journal said that the book is "strained in its silliness". Robyn Ramer of Common Sense Media gave There's a Wocket In My Pocket! four out of five stars, praising the illustrations for their color palette and for their use as visual aids when reading more difficult words.

There is no coherent plot in There's a Wocket on My Pocket!. Instead, its main appeal is its use of language and its poetic style. Paul Di Filippo compared Seuss's work in this regard favorably to that of James Joyce, arguing that Seuss is able to use this technique without alienating readers. Elizabeth B. Moje and Woan-Ru Shyu described it as one of Seuss's "most language-conscious works", saying that it allowed for children to engage with language using humor.

Professor of early learning Barbara A. Wasik likened the book's vocabulary to a child's experience learning new words. When adults read There's a Wocket in My Pocket!, they encounter words they have never seen before and must use the illustrations to determine what they mean.

The book's ending demonstrates a common Dr. Seuss theme of independence and self-confidence, as the boy says he is happy with his situation regardless of whether the reader believes him or not.

== Legacy ==
There's a Wocket In My Pocket! was adapted as a read-and-learn mobile app by Oceanhouse Media, including a digital copy of the book and ten educational minigames. It has been speculated that the real estate website Zillow derived its name from the book's Zillow on the pillow, but the company has denied this. In 2018, rapper Win Nevaluze rapped the words of There's A Wocket In My Pocket!' to the beat of the Migos song "Walk It Talk It", causing it to become an internet hit.
