= The Twelve Days of Christmas (Correspondence) =

1998 book by John Julius Norwich

The Twelve Days of Christmas [Correspondence]
- Author: John Julius Norwich
- Illustrator: Quentin Blake
- Publisher: Atlantic Books
- Publication date: 1998
- Publication place: United Kingdom
- ISBN: 9780312201630

The Twelve Days of Christmas [Correspondence], also called Twelve Days of Christmas, A Correspondence, is a 1998 monologue book by John Julius Cooper, 2nd Viscount Norwich, and illustrated by Quentin Blake. It was published by Atlantic Books and is based upon the Christmas carol "The Twelve Days of Christmas". The monologue is based upon letters written by a woman to her lover who sends her each of the gifts mentioned in the song, resulting in mayhem in her village house and the breakdown of the lovers' relationship.

== Plot ==
The monologue is performed by the reading out of letters written by Emily Wilbraham to her lover Edward. Each day for twelve days, Edward sends her one of the gifts mentioned in "The Twelve Days of Christmas" carol and Emily responds with a letter for each day. The gifts eventually cause a breakdown in their relationship, with Emily's house and gardens being ruined by all the birds, animals, and personnel that Edward sends. For the final letter, after Edward has sent members of the Royal Liverpool Philharmonic to her, Emily's solicitor G. Creep writes to inform Edward that Emily is seeking an injunction against him for harassment and would be seeking to return all the animals that were sent.

== Publication history ==
The book was first published in 1998 and has been reprinted several times. In 2002, it was recorded and set to music. The monologue has been read out at public British Christmas celebrations and festivals. In 2012, The Independent newspaper named it as one of the best books for Christmas. They also considered that it was a way of dropping hints about the consequences of poorly idealised Christmas presents.
