= One Fish, Two Fish, Red Fish, Blue Fish =

1960 children's book by Dr. Seuss

- Front cover, designed by Dr. Seuss
- Author: Dr. Seuss
- Illustrator: Dr. Seuss
- Language: English
- Genre: Children's literature
- Publisher: Random House, The Living Books Company (1998)
- Publication date: March 12, 1960 (renewed in 1988)
- Publication place: United States
- OCLC: 184473
- Preceded by: Happy Birthday to You!
- Followed by: Green Eggs and Ham

One Fish, Two Fish, Red Fish, Blue Fish (stylized as One fish two fish red fish blue fish) is a 1960 children's book by Dr. Seuss. It is a simple rhyming children's book designed for beginner readers. As of 2001, over six million copies of the book had been sold, placing it 13th on a list of "All-Time Bestselling Children's Books" from Publishers Weekly. The book is widely praised for its rhythmic language and imaginative characters, which help engage young readers and make early reading enjoyable and memorable. Based on a 2007 online poll, the United States' National Education Association labor union listed the book as one of its "Teachers' Top 100 Books for Children".

== Plot ==
The plot consists of short vignettes in which a boy and a girl describe fantastical creatures they have as friends and pets. The vignettes include short scenes featuring characters such as Ned, whose bed is too short for him, a mouse-like creature with a bird in his ear, and a character named Joe, who is unable to hear another phoning him due to a mouse cutting the wire.

== Audio and video versions ==
Rik Mayall narrated this story as part of a HarperCollins audiobook that also includes The Lorax, Dr. Seuss's ABC and How the Grinch Stole Christmas!.

On video streaming services like YouTube, there are animated read-alongs that focus on the story's illustration on top of the sing-song nature of the rhyme and rhythm of the text.

== In other media ==
In the animated adaptation of Green Eggs and Ham, the titular fish are featured in the beginning of the episode "Train". When Sam, Guy, and the Chickeraffe make their escape from a car barreling down a cliff, the car lands in a lake where it promptly crushes a house belonging to a family of fish. Later in the episode as the mother checks on her own children, she specifically lists them off as "one fish, two fish, red fish and blue fish".

A 2D animated preschool series based on the book, simply named “Red Fish, Blue Fish” was released on September 8, 2025, on Netflix. It was co-produced with Atomic Cartoons. An episode of the series was previewed as part of Netflix's Summer Playlist in June 2025.

In the 2022 horror film adaptation The Mean One, based on How the Grinch Stole Christmas!, the red fish and blue fish made an appearance in a fishbowl at the hospital.

Oceanhouse Media created an app on iOS named "One Fish Two Fish - Dr. Seuss" that serves as an interactive platform for young children to learn the children's book.

== Theme park attraction ==
One Fish, Two Fish, Red Fish, Blue Fish
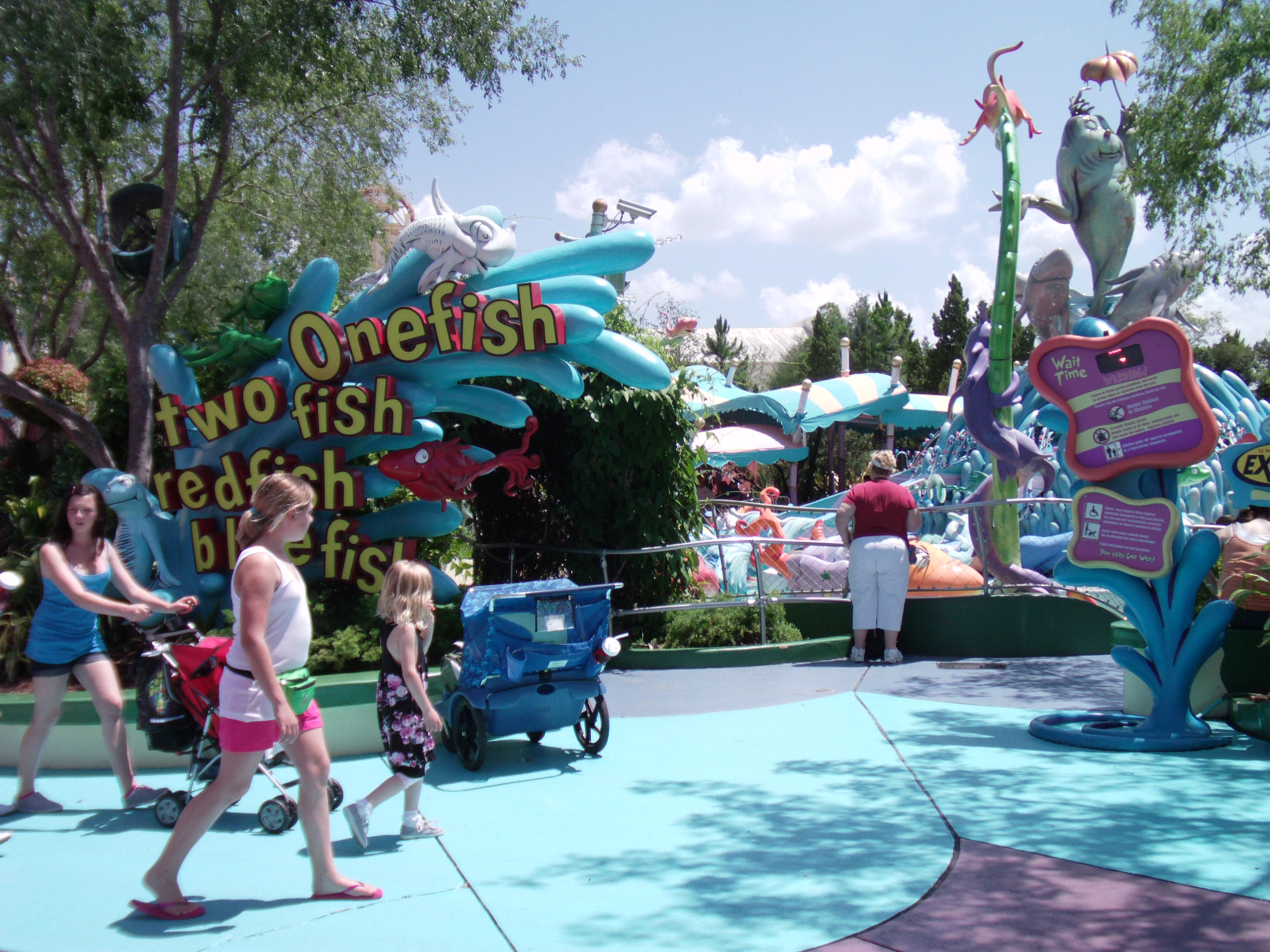
- Entrance of the One Fish, Two Fish, Red Fish, Blue Fish ride at Islands of Adventure.

Universal Islands of Adventure
- Area: Seuss Landing
- Soft opening date: March 1999
- Opening date: May 28, 1999

Ride statistics
- Attraction type: Water Ride
- Theme: One Fish, Two Fish, Red Fish, Blue Fish
- Vehicle type: Fish
- Duration: 3 min
- Universal Express available

The book was the basis of a theme park attraction located at the Universal Islands of Adventure in the Seuss Landing area of the park, called "One Fish, Two Fish, Red Fish, Blue Fish". Guests are able to ride a fish that spins and can move up or down to avoid water sprays from other fish while also listening to cues in the background music. "Climb inside your very own Dr. Seuss flying fish. Its equipped with easy-to-use controls that let you maneuver up, up, up and down, down, down as you gently glide around an array of fountains that squirt water in time to a musical rhyme. Make sure you pay attention to the words and do what they say or you just might get wet."

== Selected translations ==
- Visje een visje twee visje visje in de zee (1972, Dutch, ISBN 9024002958)
- דברים מוזרים קורים בספרים (1980, Hebrew)
- 一条鱼，两条鱼，红色的鱼，蓝色的鱼 (1992, Chinese (Simplified), ISBN 9573211246)
- Un pez, dos peces, pez rojo, pez azul (2006, Spanish, ISBN 1930332831)
- Eyn fish, tsvey fish, royter fish, bloyer fish (2007, Yiddish, ISBN 9780972693936)
- Poisson un, poisson deux, poisson rouge, poisson bleu (2011, French, ISBN 9781612430294)
