= The Grinch (GBC video game) =

2000 video game

- Developer: Konami Computer Entertainment Nagoya
- Publisher: Konami
- Director: Gen S.
- Producer: Jiro Nemoto
- Designer: Gen S.
- Programmer: Kuninori Yabashi
- Composer: Rie Fukuda
- Platform: Game Boy Color
- Release: NA: November 7, 2000; EU: December 2000
- Genres: Maze, stealth
- Mode: Single-player

The Grinch is a 2000 video game developed and published by Konami for the Game Boy Color. A maze video game with stealth elements, the player controls the Grinch and his dog Max, who must navigate mazes and steal presents while avoiding detection from citizens. The game, as well as its console and PC counterpart, was the result of a partnership between Konami and Universal Interactive that allowed Konami to distribute and market video games based on Universal Studios franchises. The game received mixed reviews from critics, who widely noted its similarities to Pac-Man and Metal Gear Solid and approved of its premise and presentation, with individual criticisms directed at its short length, repetitive gameplay, low difficulty, and lack of features.

== Gameplay ==
In this example of gameplay from The Grinch, the Grinch saunters through the bottom path of a room whilst a Who citizen surveys his surroundings. The presents that the Grinch must steal are littered about the area.

The Grinch is a maze video game that combines Pac-Man-style collection with Metal Gear Solid-inspired stealth mechanics. The player controls the Grinch or his dog Max to steal Christmas presents scattered across maze-like levels in Whoville while avoiding detection by citizens (Whos). Children who spot the Grinch will pursue him in an attempt to embrace him, which costs a life if he is caught. Adults, unlike children, shriek upon seeing the Grinch, attracting children as well as constables, who have been ordered to arrest the Grinch. Constables are armed with "freezers" which can immobilize the Grinch, requiring rapid presses of the B button to escape. Some doors in a level require the Grinch to collect a key of the same color to open. A level is cleared when all presents have been collected within the time limit, which can be increased by collecting tokens. The Grinch can crouch, crawl, and hide (e.g., under tables) to avoid Whos' field of vision, though presents increase in score value if they are collected while the Grinch is being chased.

By default, the Grinch is armed with bad breath that can stun Whos at close range. If the Grinch is standing in snow, he can create snowballs that he can toss from a distance. The Grinch's dog Max is playable in some levels, and can jump over Dobermanns who try to catch him or bark to startle them. The player can trick pursuing Whos into colliding with each other, causing them to drop items for extra points. Later levels introduce driving a bumper car and hurling rotten eggs at Whos. The game is made up of 40 levels across 7 chapters (taking place in Whoville, a forest, a carnival, a mountain, a garbage dump, and a private home), supported by a password system for saving progress.

== Plot ==
In Whoville, the Whos adore Christmas, but the Grinch, living just north of town, despises it. Determined to end the holiday, he devises a plan to steal all the Whos' presents, believing this will stop Christmas. After frightening the young Cindy Lou Who at the post office and wreaking havoc on a bumper car, the Grinch crafts a sleigh from assorted junk and enacts his plan. Disguised as Santa Claus, he sneaks into homes on Christmas Eve, taking gifts and decorations. When interrupted by Cindy Lou Who, he lies about fixing her Christmas tree and sends her back to bed. After stealing everything, he takes the loot to Mount Crumpit to destroy it. However, he hears the Whos singing joyfully despite their loss, realizing Christmas is not about material gifts. His heart grows three sizes, and, filled with newfound warmth, he returns all the presents and joins the Whos' celebration, embracing the true spirit of Christmas.

== Development and release ==
On December 16, 1999, Universal Studios and Konami announced a global strategic alliance that would allow Konami to distribute and market video games produced and developed by Universal Interactive Studios based on Universal Studios franchises, including the film How the Grinch Stole Christmas. The game was developed by Konami Computer Entertainment Nagoya, with Jiro Nemoto serving as producer and with direction and game design credited to "Gen S.". Kuninori Yabashi programmed the game, and Rie Fukuda composed the music. The game was released in North America on November 7, 2000, and in Europe in December 2000.

== Reception ==
Reception

Aggregate score
Aggregator	Score
GameRankings	67%

Review scores
Publication	Score
Computer and Video Games	2/5
Gamekult	5/10
IGN	9/10
Nintendo Power	6.7/10
Pocket Games	8/10
Total Game Boy	90%

The Grinch received mixed reviews from critics, with an aggregate score of 67% on GameRankings. Critics widely compared the game's blend of maze and stealth mechanics to Pac-Man and Metal Gear Solid. Craig Harris of IGN praised the gameplay as fun and unique, highlighting the satisfying combination of sneaking, collecting, and using abilities like throwing snowballs or driving bumper cars. He compared it to classic arcade games, emphasizing its pick-up-and-play appeal and replay value despite the low amount of levels. Jem Roberts of Total Game Boy regarded the game as "a pretty cool part of the Christmas Grinch craze", deriving particular enjoyment from pelting Whos with snowballs. However, he criticized the cumbersome passwords and lack of gameplay and sound options. Pocket Games commended the "brilliant" match of the game's engine with the Grinch license, appreciating the variety of actions and increasing level complexity, but suggested that a random maze and enemy generator could have improved the game's replay value. Usul of Gamekult said that the simple but effective gameplay was suitable for younger players, with varied levels like bumper car sections adding some diversity, though he noted that the repetitive levels and low difficulty may bore older players. Computer and Video Games, deeming the game a disappointing cash-in, found the gameplay dull and repetitive, criticizing the clunky controls and the strain of tracking tiny enemy sprites, with only occasional satisfaction from outsmarting enemies.

The festive presentation and premise were met positively. Harris emphasized the appeal of playing the villain, offset by the ironic twist of Whos wanting to hug the Grinch, making it a "charming" and fun role. Roberts described the "bright Christmassy graphics and perky game tunes", making it ideal for holiday play. Pocket Games and Nintendo Power appreciated the game's faithfulness to its license, with the latter citing the "Dr. Seuss spin" as a major draw. Usul noted that the "cute" graphics would appeal to younger players.

The game was a runner-up for the "Action Game of 2000" award in Editors' Choice at IGN's Best of 2000 Awards for Game Boy Color.
