= The Pocket Book of Boners =

1931 book by Dr. Seuss

- 1941 Readers' League of America printing
- Author: Dr. Seuss
- Cover artist: Dr. Seuss
- Language: English
- Genre: Humor
- Publisher: The Viking Press
- Publication date: June 23, 1931
- Publication place: United States
- Media type: Print (paperback)
- Pages: 120

The Pocket Book of Boners is a book illustrated by Theodor Seuss Geisel (Dr. Seuss), originally published as four separate books in 1931–32 by The Viking Press. In 1941, Readers' League of America compiled these four books and published the Pocket Book of Boners. It was one of the bestselling paperback books of World War II, with 1.34 million copies in print by 1945. "The Pocket Book of ___" was the proprietary title cliché of the publisher.

The Pocket Book of Boners contains 22 illustrations of boners (howlers, blunders), drawn by Dr. Seuss. The rest of the volume consists of short jokes and humorous observations with most being no more than four lines long. It is notable for being an early example of Dr. Seuss' distinct illustration style.

All boners in the book are anonymous. Harry Hansen writes that "presumably these lines come out of the mouths of babes". Gary K. Wolfe concludes that these are humorous schoolboy mistakes.

== Boners series ==
The first book was released in February 1931. A short positive review in The New York Times described Dr. Seuss's illustrations as "hilarious". The pseudonym "Alexander Abingdon" was used as the author of the series, which was originally released in order as follows.

- Boners (102 p.) (copyright February 7, 1931) (illustrated by Dr. Seuss)
- More Boners (copyright April 13, 1931) (illustrated by Dr. Seuss)
- Still More Boners (copyright August 4, 1931) (illustrated by Virginia Huget)
- Prize Boners for 1932 (copyright March 4, 1932) (illustrated by Virginia Huget).

Many compilations of Boners content were subsequently released, including The Omnibus Boners (1931), The 2nd Boners Omnibus (1938) (pictures by Galdone), and Bigger & Better Boners (1952).
