= Virginia Huget =

American cartoonist

Virginia Clark (December 22, 1899 – June 27, 1991), better known as Virginia Huget, was a prolific and versatile American comic strip artist and writer. She is known for her comic strips depicting flappers and for broadening the flapper image by depicting them as young working women as opposed to freewheeling and carefree, which was the commonly used stereotype at the time.

== Career ==
Gentleman Prefer Blondes was Huget's first work and was sold to Bell Syndicate in 1926. In 1927 Huget created Babs in Society, a full-page Sunday color strip. Other strips she produced in this form were: Flora's Fling (1928), Campus Caper (1928), Babs (1929), Double Dora (1929) Miss Aladdin (1929). She also drew the black-and-white strips Molly the Manicure Girl (1928, written by John P. Medbury) and Campus Capers (1929). Strips from Molly the Manicure Girl are kept in the Library of Congress. In 1931 and 1932 Huget illustrated Dr. Seuss' Still More Boners (1931) and Prize Boners for 1932. She later won first prize from the Art Director's League of New York for her Lux soap ads that were created in comic strip format. In 1937 she successfully imitated Percy Crosby's style, drawing his comic strip Skippy when he was unable to because of his alcoholism. Huget began drawing Don Flowers' Oh, Diana!, an adventure strip, in 1944 under the name Virginia Clark, eventually transforming it into a teen strip, which was a more popular genre at the time.

== Personal life ==
Huget was born in Dallas, Texas, in 1899. There she met and married Coon Williams Hudzietz. She changed her last name to Huget when she sold her first comic in 1926. She studied at the Art Institute of Chicago.
