= James Stevenson (illustrator) =

American illustrator (1929–2017)

- Born: July 11, 1929; New York City, New York, U.S.
- Died: February 17, 2017 (aged 87); Cos Cob, Connecticut, U.S.
- Education: Yale University; Hackley School
- Occupations: Cartoonist, illustrator, writer
- Employer: The New Yorker (1956–2017)
- Spouse(s): Josephine Merck (1993–2017); Jane Walker
- Children: Charles, Sucie, James, Walker, Harvey, Peter, Jane, Edwina, Emily
- Parent(s): Harvey Stevenson; Winifred (Worcester) Stevenson

James Stevenson (July 11, 1929 – February 17, 2017) was an American illustrator and author of over 100 children's books. His cartoons appeared regularly in The New Yorker magazine. He usually used a unique comic book style of illustration that is very recognizable. His books, like What's Under My Bed, have been featured on the Reading Rainbow television series.

== Biography ==
James Stevenson was born in New York City and educated at Yale University, where he was the feature editor of campus humor magazine The Yale Record.

He contributed his first cartoon to The New Yorker on March 10, 1956.

James Stevenson wrote and illustrated his first book, Walker, the Witch, and the Striped Flying Saucer, in 1969. He had previously illustrated the children's book If I Owned a Candy Factory (1968) written by his then eight-year-old son, James Walker Stevenson.

== Awards ==
- Could Be Worse! (1977) - was awarded the New York Times' "Outstanding Children's Book of the Year", and School Library Journal's "Best Books for Spring"
- The Sea View Hotel (1978) - ALA Notable Book
- Monty (1979) - School Library Journal's "Best Books for Spring"
- Fast Friends: Two Stories (1979) - ALA's Notable Book designation
- The Worst Person in the World (1979) - Children's Choice Award (International Reading Association)
- Howard (1980) - New York Times' "Best Illustrated Book" and New York Times' "Outstanding Book"
- That Terrible Halloween Night (1980) - ALA's Notable Book designation and Children's Choice Award (International Reading Association)
- The Wish Card Ran Out! (1981) - School Library Journal's Best Books of 1981
- The Night after Christmas (1982) - Children's Choice Award (International Reading Association) and Boston Globe/Horn Book honor list
- We Can't Sleep (1982) - Christopher Award
- Oliver, Clarence, and Violet (1982) - Parents' Choice Award
- What's Under My Bed? (1983) - Boston Globe/Horn Book's honor list, ALA's Notable Book designation, and School Library Journal's Best Books of 1983
- Grandpa's Great City Tour: An Alphabet Book (1982) - Garden State Children's Book Award (New Jersey Library Association)
- Higher on the Door (1987) - Parents' Choice designation and Redbook award
- Georgia Music (1987) - Boston Globe/Horn Book honor list
- Granddaddy's Place (1987) - Parents' Choice Picture Book award
- The Supreme Souvenir Factory (1989) - Children's Choice Award (International Reading Association)
- Oh No, It's Waylon's Birthday! (1990) - Children's Choice Award (International Reading Association)
- Something Big Has Been Here (1992) - Kentucky Bluegrass Award
- Don't You Know There's a War On? (1992) - Parents' Choice Picture Book award

== Select bibliography ==
=== Children's books ===
- If I Owned a Candy Factory (1968)
- Walker, the Witch, and the Striped Flying Saucer (1969)
- Here Comes Herb's Hurricane! (1973)
- Monty (1980)
- Howard (1980)
- Clams Can't Sing (1980)
- The Wish Card Ran Out! (1981)
- The Night After Christmas (1981)
- Cully Cully and the Bear (1983)
- Barbara's birthday (1983)
- Are We Almost There? (1985)
- When I Was Nine (1986)
- Higher On the Door (1987)
- No Need for Monty (1987)
- July (1990)
- Mr. Hacker (1990)
- Quick! Turn the Page! (1990)
- The Stowaway (1990)
- Rolling Rose (1992)
- Don't You Know There's a War On? (1992)
- Fun No Fun (1994)
- I Had a Lot of Wishes (1995)
- Yard Sale (1996)
- I Meant to Tell You (1996)
- The Oldest Elf (1996)
- Heat Wave at Mud Flat (1997)
- A Village Full of Valentines (1998)
- Sam the Zamboni Man (1998)
- The Most Amazing Dinosaur (2000)
- The Castaway (2002)

==== Grandpa, Mary Ann and Louie series ====
A series of tales told by a grandfather character to his grandchildren. Usually containing outrageous and unbelievable tales:

1. Could Be Worse! (1977)
2. That Terrible Halloween Night (1980)
3. We Can't Sleep (1982)
4. The Great Big Especially Beautiful Easter Egg (1983)
5. Grandpa's Great City Tour: An Alphabet Book (1982)
6. What's Under My Bed? (1983)
7. Worse Than Willy (1984)
8. That Dreadful Day (1985)
9. There's Nothing to Do! (1986)
10. No Friends (1986)
11. Will You Please Feed Our Cat? (1987)
12. We Hate Rain! (1988)
13. Grandpa's Too-Good Garden (1989)
14. Brrr (1991)
15. That's Exactly the Way It Wasn't (1991)

==== Emma series ====
Featuring Emma, a good witch, and her nemeses Dolores and Lavinia:

1. Yuck! (1984)
2. Emma (1985)
3. Fried Feathers for Thanksgiving
4. Happy Valentine's Day, Emma! (1987)
5. Un-Happy New Year, Emma!
6. Emma at the Beach (1990)

==== The Worst series ====
Featuring a crotchety old man:

- The Worst Person in the World (1978)
- The Worst Person in the World at Crab Beach (1988)
- The Worst Person's Christmas (1991)
- Worse than the Worst (1994)
- The Worst Goes South (1995)

==== Mr. Frimdimpny series ====
These books feature the alligator Mr. Frimdimpny who has rules about no laughing:

- Don't Make Me Laugh (1999)
- No Laughing, No Smiling, No Giggling (2004)

==== Mud Flat Friends series ====
- The Mud Flat Olympics (1994)
- Yard Sale (1996)
- Heat Wave at Mud Flat (1997)
- The Mud Flat Mystery (1997)
- Mud Flat April Fool (1998)
- Mud Flat Spring (1999)
- Christmas at Mud Flat (2000)
- Flying Feet: A Mud Flat Story (2004)

==== Autobiographical and reminiscent picture book series ====
A series of books illustrated in a softer watercolor style:

- When I Was Nine
- Higher on the Door (1987)
- July
- Don't You Know There's a War On?
- Fun No Fun (1994)
- I Had a Lot of Wishes (1995)
- I Meant to Tell You (1996)
- Lost and Found New York: Oddballs, Heroes, Heartbreakers, Scoundrels, Thugs, Mayors, and Mysteries (2007)

=== Young Adult novels ===
- The Bones in the Cliff
- The Unprotected Witness

=== Poetry ===
Collections of James Stevenson's poetry, illustrated by himself.

- Candy Corn
- Popcorn
- Cornflakes
- Sweet Corn
- Corn Chowder
- Corn-Fed
- Just Around the CORNer

=== Cartoons collections ===
- Sorry, Lady. This Beach Is Private! (1963)
- Let's Boogie! (1978)

=== Novels ===
- Do Yourself a Favor, Kid (1962)
- The Summer Houses (1963)
- Sometimes, But Not Always (1967)
- Something Marvelous Is About to Happen (1971)
- Cool Jack and the Beanstalk (1976)
- Uptown Local, Downtown Express (1983)

=== Illustrations for other authors ===
- The McLandress Dimension (1968) by John Kenneth Galbraith
- If I Owned a Candy Factory (1968) by James Walker Stevenson (James Stevenson's son)
- "Encyclopedia Brown Saves the Day" by Donald J. Sobol
- Tony's Hard Work Day (1972) by Alan Arkin
- Cully Cully and the Bear (1983) by Wilson Gage
- I Know a Lady (1984) by Charlotte Zolotow
- I Am Not Going to Get Up Today! (1987) by Dr. Seuss
- Percy and the Five Houses by Else Holmelund Minarik
- Loop the Loop (1992) by Barbara Dugan
- The Royal Nap (1995) by Charles C. Black
- Rocks in His Head (2001) by Carol Otis Hurst
- Happily Ever After (2001) by Anna Quindlen

==== Illustrations for Judy Blume ====
The following books by Judy Blume feature cover artwork and inner illustrations by James Stevenson:

- Soupy Saturdays with the Pain and the Great One (August 28, 2007) ISBN 0-385-73305-4
- Cool Zone! with the Pain and the Great One (May 13, 2008) ISBN 0-385-73306-2
- Going, Going, Gone! with the Pain and the Great One (August 12, 2008) ISBN 0-385-73307-0
- Friend or Fiend? with the Pain and the Great One (May 12, 2009) ISBN 0-385-73308-9

==== Illustrations for Janet Schulman ====
James Stevenson illustrated three of Janet Schulman's Jack the Bum series:

- Jack the Bum and the Halloween Handout (1977)
- Jack the Bum and the Haunted House (1977)
- Jack the Bum and the UFO (1978)

==== Illustrations for Helen V. Griffith ====
James Stevenson illustrated a few of Helen V. Griffith's books:

- Georgia Music (1986)

===== Helen V. Griffith's Grandaddy trilogy =====
All illustrated by James Stevenson:

1. Grandaddy's Place (1987)
2. Grandaddy and Janetta (1993)
3. Grandaddy's Stars (1995)

- Grandaddy and Janetta Together: The Three Stories in One Book (2001) (anthology that collects the three previous Grandaddy books)

==== Illustrations for Jack Prelutsky ====
The following books of children's poetry by Jack Prelutsky are illustrated by James Stevenson:

- The Baby Ugs are Hatching (1982)
- The New Kid on the Block (1984)
- Something BIG Has Been Here (1990)
- A Pizza the Size of the Sun (1996)
- It's Raining Pigs and Noodles (2000)
- My Dog May Be a Genius (2008)
