= I Am Not Going to Get Up Today! =

Book by Dr. Seuss

- Hardcover cover
- Author: Dr. Seuss
- Illustrator: James Stevenson
- Language: English
- Genre: Children's literature
- Publisher: Random House
- Publication date: October 12, 1987
- Publication place: United States
- Media type: Print (hardcover)
- Pages: 48
- ISBN: 978-0394892177
- Preceded by: You're Only Old Once!
- Followed by: The Tough Coughs as He Ploughs the Dough

I Am Not Going to Get Up Today! is a children's book written by Dr. Seuss and illustrated by James Stevenson. It was published by Random House on October 12, 1987. It is one of only two books initially credited to Dr. Seuss, along with Great Day for Up!, not to be illustrated by Seuss himself. The book is told from the perspective of a boy who decides not to get out of bed as his family and neighbors try to convince him to get up. Audio versions have been released, including a cassette tape in 1988 and an audiobook read by Jason Alexander in 2003.

== Plot ==
A boy lies in bed and announces that he is not going to get up today, ignoring his alarm clock and chirping birds. He muses that all of the children of the world will get up, but he stays in bed, saying that his breakfast egg can be returned to the hen. His family and his neighbors try various things to disturb him and lure him out of bed, but he refuses to get up. A police officer and the United States Marines arrive to help, and his refusal to get out of bed appears in newspapers. They finally accept that he is serious, so his mother offers the egg to the police officer.

== Background and release ==
I Am Not Going to Get Up Today! was written by Theodor Seuss Geisel, using the pen name Dr. Seuss. By the time Seuss began work on this book, his health had begun to fail. Lacking the energy to do the illustrations himself, he gave the job to James Stevenson. He worked on the book while he was developing the idea for his final book, Oh, the Places You'll Go!. I Am Not Going to Get Up Today! was published by Random House as the 74th book in Random House's Beginner Book imprint. It was the first Beginner Book published by Seuss in eight years, and it proved to be his final entry under the imprint. It was released on October 12, 1987.

I Am Not Going to Get Up Today! was adapted as a cassette tape in 1988 as part of the Young Imaginations Series, featuring a nine-year-old rapping the lines of the narrator. The book was released as an audiobook in 2003 as part of the Green Eggs and Ham and Other Servings From Dr. Seuss collection. It was voiced by Jason Alexander.

== Reception and legacy ==
Raymond Teague of the Fort Worth Star-Telegram said that the book "merrily romps through the language", and he praised Stevenson's drawings, saying that they complemented the story's tone. The School Library Journal featured a review from St. Catherine's School librarian Laura McCutcheon in 1988, who found the story to be "a disappointment", criticizing the rhymes as forced in a way that makes the book unsuitable for early readers. She felt that the drawings were "loose and fluid but border on messy" and that they did not suit the text. Common Sense Media gave I Am Not Going to Get Up Today! four out of five stars, describing it as "vibrant and direct" and praising it for its momentum and wordplay. It also gave a positive review of Stevenson's illustrations, complimenting them for being "frisky" and describing the pastel color palette as "soothing to the eye". Librarian Jody Risacher of the Clermont County Public Library praised the 1988 cassette version for its rhythm and sound effects.

In 2000, Publishers Weekly listed I Am Not Going to Get Up Today! as number 135 in its list of all-time best-selling hardcover children's books in the United States.

== Analysis and themes ==
Biographer Charles D. Cohen speculated that the plot of I Am Not Going to Get Up Today! was Seuss's way of expressing his own tiredness in his ill health. Philosophy professors Robert Main and Matthew Pierlott describe the boy's desire to stay in bed as relatable, comparing it to the philosophy of Socrates, who said that rest and ultimately death are not things that should be seen negatively.

I Am Not Going to Get Up Today! presents a common theme in Dr. Seuss books where the character challenges norms. The narrator is steadfast in his decision to stay in bed, and he ignores both physical and social pressure to make him get up. It is also one of several Dr. Seuss books in which the images at the end are reminiscent of those at the beginning. In this case, both feature the narrator laying in his bed in the same way.

When analyzing the wording of several Dr. Seuss books, communications professor Lois Einhorn determined that 72% of the words in I Am Not Going to Get Up Today! have positive connotations and 28% have negative connotations. This was a higher proportion of positive words than most of the other Dr. Seuss books she analyzed. Einhorn concluded that its unpopularity relative to other Dr. Seuss books was because of this ratio, which indicated a lack of interesting conflict.

As with many books by Dr. Seuss, there are several nonce words created for I Am Not Going to Get Up Today!. These include a fictional dish to entice the narrator, a Pineapple Butterscotch Ding Dang Doo, and various descriptors for sleep: zazz, zizz, zizz-zizz, zuzz, and woozy-snoozy.

== See also ==
- List of Dr. Seuss books
