= Oh Say Can You Say? =

1979 book by Dr. Seuss

- Author: Dr. Seuss
- Illustrator: Dr. Seuss
- Language: English
- Genre: Children's literature
- Publisher: Random House
- Publication date: October 12, 1979
- Publication place: United States
- Media type: Print (hardcover)
- Preceded by: I Can Read with My Eyes Shut!
- Followed by: Hunches in Bunches

Oh Say Can You Say? is a children's book written and illustrated by American author and illustrator Theodor Geisel under the pen name Dr. Seuss, published in 1979 by Random House. It is a collection of 22 tongue-twisters. It was Dr. Seuss's last beginner book to feature his own illustrations.

It was read by Miranda Richardson for HarperCollins along with Scrambled Eggs Super!, Horton Hatches the Egg and The Sneetches and Other Stories.

== Plot ==
=== Introduction ===
In the introduction, Hooey the parrot reads from a copy of "Oh Say Can You Say" and states that the words in it are all phooey, and when one says them, one's lips will make slips and backflips, and one's tongues may end up in St. Looey.

=== Fresh, Fresher, Freshest ===
In the first one, a diner owner Finney sells three platters of fish which are fresh, fresher, and freshest to which he considers French-fried.

=== Dinn's Shin ===
In the second one, a skeletal Apatosaurus Dinn at a museum loses his left front shinbones, but with his handy shinbone pin bin, Pinner Blinn appears and fixes Dinn up by pinning his shinbones right back in.

=== Bed Spreader, Bread Spreader ===
In the third one, while a bed spreader spreads his bedspread on his bed, a bread spreader spreads butter on slices of bread. However, if the bed spreader doesn't pay attention to how he's doing so, the bread spreader ends up buttering his entire bedding when he's covered by his bedspread.

=== Ape Cakes, Grape Cakes ===
In the fourth one, a hungry monkey sits on a palm tree wolfing down a plate of green grape cakes and states that the keener keen apes are to gobble the cakes - they're great! This is followed by a short poem in which a dog-like creature, resembling Marvin K. Mooney, looks in his handheld mirror and sees what he says and then just says what he sees.

=== Money ===
In the fifth one, a man should leave his pet called a Grox home when he travels by air. However, if he takes him with him, they doubly charge costs, and he must pack up and lock up the Grox in a Grox box which costs much, much more than any fox boxes. So, to fly with his foxes, it's a lot cheaper than spend a lot of money on boxes for Groxes.

=== Thimble or Shingle ===
In the sixth one, the dog-like creature asks one which will cost more and to choose between a thimble and a shingle.

=== Eat at Skipper Zipp's ===
In the seventh one, Skipper Zipp invites his customers to lunch at his ship called "Skipper Zipp's Clipper Ship Chip Chop Shop" where he serves delicious pork chops and crispy potato chips.

=== Fuddnuddlers ===
In the eighth one, the Fuddnuddler Brothers (consisting of Bipper, Bud, Skipper, Jipper, Jeffery, Jud, Horatio, Horace, Hendrix, Hud, Dinwoodie, Dinty, Dud, Fitzsimmon, Fredrick, Fud, Slinky, Stinky, Stuart, and Stud), piling up on each other's head, stand on top of their brother Lud. However, a dog watches as Lud sneezes, and his name will be changed to "mud" when he apparently falls down.

=== Quack Quack ===
In the ninth one, a couple of colorful ducks (blue and black) quack at each other.

=== Schnack ===
In the tenth one, the dog-like creature, carrying a creature called a Schnack in his backpack, lives in a shack that's got cracks and a smokestack.

=== West Beast, East Beast ===
In the eleventh one, a boy on an uncharted island chooses between a couple of giant beasts sitting, pouting, on each side of the beach which will be the best one ever. Then, he picked the East which seems to be the best, much to the East's extreme shyness.

=== Pete Pats Pigs ===
In the twelfth one, Pete Briggs the pig keeper pats every single pig until after he gets done with them, he puts them away in their pigpen.

=== Fritz Food, Fred Food ===
In the thirteenth one, Fritz, resembling Mr. Brown from Mr. Brown Can Moo! Can You?, feeds some green morsels to his dog Fred, and Fred feeds some orange ones to Fritz.

=== How to Tell a Klotz From a Glotz ===
In the fourteenth one, a boy, peering through a spyglass, looks up at a couple of deer-like creatures known as a Glotz (with spots) and a Klotz (with dots). The dots on a Klotz are said to be exactly the same size as the spots on a Glotz.

=== What Would You Rather Be When You Grow Up? ===
In the fifteenth one, there are a trio of dog-like creatures (a police officer, a cupcake baker, and a pancake maker) as one's asked what occupation will become and to choose between the police officer in a cap, the cupcake baker in a baker hat, and the pancake maker in a pancake-like cap in the shape of a beret. Otherwise, if not as another one shows up which is a captain soldier in a weird-looking cap, then one will probably like that of his.

=== More About Blinn ===
In the sixteenth one, as a sequel to "Dinn's Shin", Pinner Blinn goes home exhausted from work, and when he gets plenty of rest, his twin sons play violins to play their father a lullaby thereby putting him to sleep.

=== Gretchen von Schwinn ===
In the seventeenth one, a young blonde Gretchen von Schwinn of Berlin walks down the street with her six-stringed tin mandolin with mechanical legs.

=== Rope Soap, Hoop Soap ===
In the eighteenth one, with "Skrope" rope detergent, a lady creature scrubs a stain off a rope that the dog-like creature is holding. As for "Skrope", its slogan says, "Skrope is so strong that no rope is too long." On the next one, he holds a giant red hoop with stains just before she pours "Soapy Cooper's Super Soup-Off Hoop Soak Suds" hoop detergent into a giant vat to dissolve the stubborn stains off of it which will be squeaky clean.

=== Merry Christmas Mush ===
In the nineteenth one, at Christmas brunch, Santa Claus serves a boy and his dog a bowl full of sickening green mush, much to their disgust.

=== And Speaking of Christmas.... ===
In the twentieth one, the boy sees his father Jim floating in the water, wearing a pair of swim fins which is his perfect Christmas gift. Then, a man (and one's father) named Dwight, outside at night, looks at some birds with a Bright Dwight Bird Flight Night Sight Light on his head which is his Christmas gift, also.

=== But Never Give Your Daddy a Walrus ===
In the twenty-first one, a blonde girl brings her father a walrus which is a bad and worse pet even yet. The walrus with his tough, rough, wet whiskers whispers something to his ear which really burns red hot, with blispers and bliskers.

=== Storm Starts (Final Tongue Twister from Hooey) ===
In the twenty-second and final one, Hooey, walking tired and depressed and losing a few feathers, declares that's almost enough of those silly tongue twisters for one simple day. He also says that there's one more left to go just before one's done: There he is, holding beneath his umbrella, in a thunderstorm when the raindrops start pouring, and when it stops, so does the storm.
