= Quentin Blake =

British cartoonist, illustrator and children's writer (born 1932)

Sir Quentin Blake CH CBE FRSL FCSD RDI
- Born: Quentin Saxby Blake; 16 December 1932 (age 93); Sidcup, Kent, England
- Education: Downing College, Cambridge; UCL Institute of Education; Chelsea School of Art; Camberwell College of Art
- Known for: Illustration
- Awards: Kate Greenaway Medal (1980); Hans Christian Andersen Award (2002); CBE (2005); Knight Bachelor (2013)

Sir Quentin Saxby Blake (born 16 December 1932) is an English cartoonist, caricaturist, illustrator and children's writer. He has illustrated over 300 books, including 18 written by Roald Dahl, which are among his most popular works. (Note: WorldCat reports the twenty works by Blake that are most widely held by participating libraries. They are seventeen books written by Roald Dahl, Great Day for Up! by Dr. Seuss (rank 5), Michael Rosen's Sad Book (rank 14), and Wizzil by William Steig (rank 18).: "Blake, Quentin". WorldCat. Retrieved 2012-08-30.) For his lasting contribution as a children's illustrator, Blake won the biennial international Hans Christian Andersen Award in 2002, the highest recognition available to creators of children's books. From 1999 to 2001, he was the inaugural British Children's Laureate. Blake is a patron of the Association of Illustrators.

== Early life ==
Blake was born on 16 December 1932 in Sidcup, Kent, son of William Blake and Maud Evelyn (Legerton) Blake. His father was a civil servant, and his mother a housewife. Blake was evacuated to the West Country during the Second World War.

Blake attended Holy Trinity Lamorbey Church of England Primary School and Chislehurst and Sidcup Grammar School, where his English teacher, J. H. Walsh, influenced his life's work. Blake's artistic development during his school years was also helped by contact with the painter and cartoonist Alfred Jackson, the husband of Blake's Latin teacher, who encouraged his first submissions to Punch, resulting in his first publication at the age of 16. In the sixth form, the school's art teacher, the painter Stanley Simmonds, recognized Blake's talents and provided support and exposure to the work of other artists.

From 1953 to 1956, Blake read English Literature at Downing College, Cambridge, under F. R. Leavis. He has since denied that studying at the University of Cambridge contributed to his artistic or creative talent. Blake received his postgraduate teaching diploma from the University of London Institute of Education. Later, Blake studied part-time at the Chelsea School of Art and subsequently Camberwell College of Art.

== Career ==
=== Teaching ===
During the 1960s, Blake taught English at the Lycée Français de Londres which cemented his long association with France and culminated in the award of the Legion of Honour.

Blake taught at the Royal College of Art for over 20 years. From 1978 to 1986, he was head of the Illustration department.

=== Illustration ===
The first book Blake illustrated was The Wonderful Button by Evan Hunter, published by Abelard-Schuman in 1961. He illustrated the first Dr. Seuss book that Seuss did not illustrate himself, Great Day for Up! (1974), as well as other Dr. Seuss books.

As his career progressed, Blake gained a reputation as a loyal, reliable and humorous illustrator of children's books. By 2006, he had illustrated 323 books, of which he had written 35 and Roald Dahl had written 18. He has also illustrated for books by Joan Aiken, Elizabeth Bowen, Sylvia Plath, Nils-Olof Franzén, William Steig, and two of David Walliams' books. He has illustrated Folio Society Limited Editions such as Don Quixote, Candide and 50 Fables of La Fontaine.

In the 1970s, Blake was an occasional presenter of the BBC children's storytelling programme Jackanory, when he would illustrate the stories on a canvas as he was telling them. In the 1980s, Blake was the artist behind the comic strip Waldo and Wanda, written by John Yeoman.

In 1993, Blake designed the five British Christmas issue postage stamps featuring episodes from A Christmas Carol by Charles Dickens.

Besides children's books, Blake is also the designer of Ben, the logo of the shop chain Ben's Cookies. He designed several illustrations for the story time segments for the Scottish TV series Squeak!.

In 2023, Blake was asked by Blue Peter to design a new Blue Peter badge which they have called their Book badge.

In 2026, Blake was featured in a Southbank Centre exhibition, Quentin Blake: The Southbank Parade, featuring illustrations indoors, and a procession of Blake's characters outside the Royal Festival Hall.

=== Community and Charitable work ===
Blake is a member of the Chelsea Arts Club. He is patron of the Blake Society, Downing College's arts and humanities society. Blake is also a patron of "The Big Draw", which aims to get people drawing throughout the United Kingdom, and of The Nightingale Project, a charity that provides art to hospitals. Since 2006, Blake has produced work for several hospitals and mental health centres in the London area, a children's hospital (Hopital Armand Trousseau) in Paris, and a maternity hospital in Angers, France. These projects are detailed in Blake's 2012 book Quentin Blake: Beyond the Page, which describes how, in his seventies, his work has increasingly appeared outside the pages of books, in public places such as hospitals, theatre foyers, galleries and museums. In 2007, Blake designed a huge mural on fabric, suspended over and thus disguising a ramshackle building immediately opposite an entrance to St Pancras railway station. The rendering of an "imaginary welcoming committee" greets passengers arriving on the Eurostar high-speed railway.

Blake is a supporter of and ambassador for the indigenous rights NGO Survival International. In 2009, he said, "For me, Survival is important for two reasons; one is that I think it's right that we should give help and support to people who are threatened by the rapacious industrial society we have created; and the other that, more generally, it gives an important signal about how we all ought to be looking after the world. Its message is the most fundamental of any charity I'm connected with."

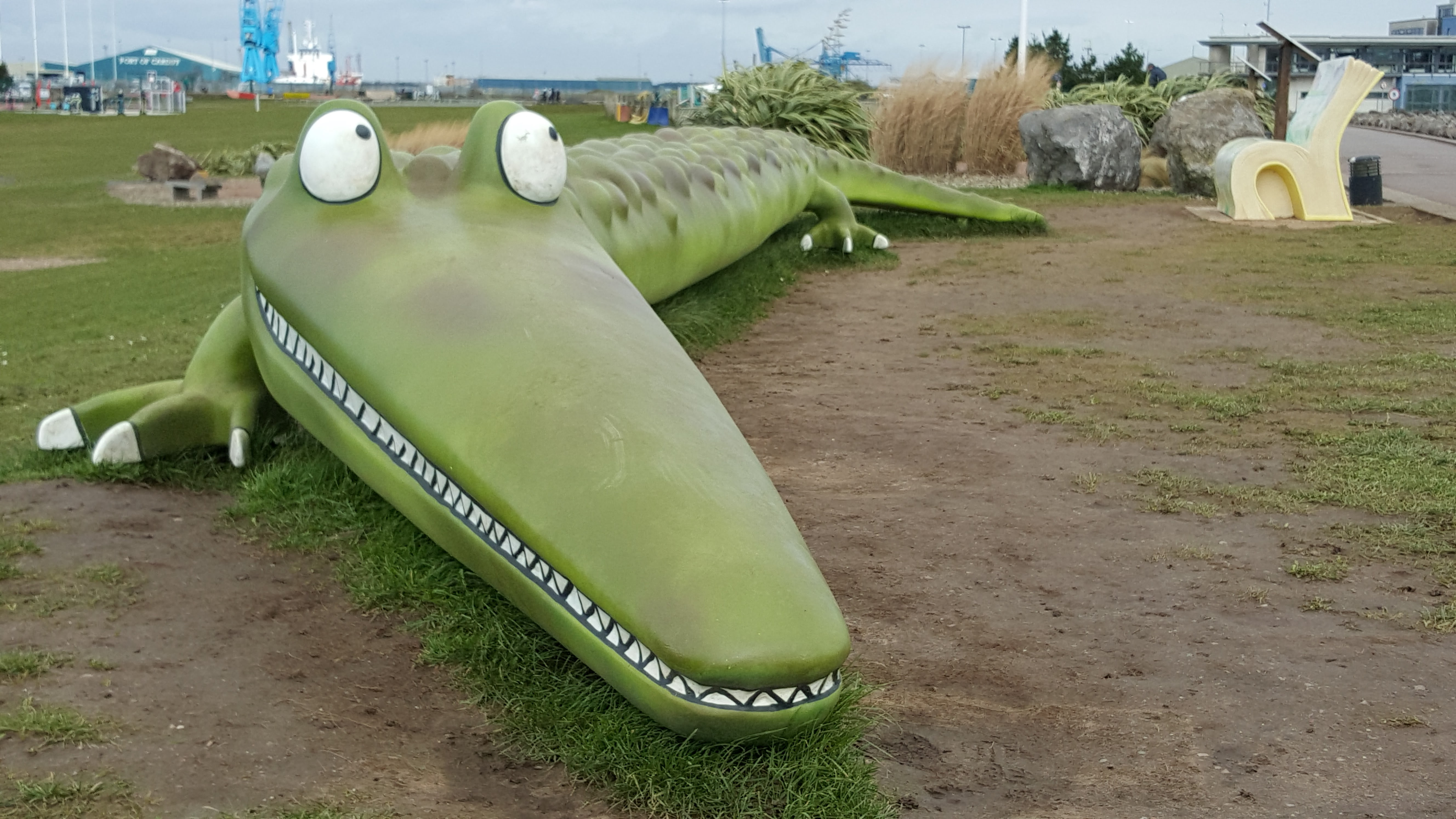
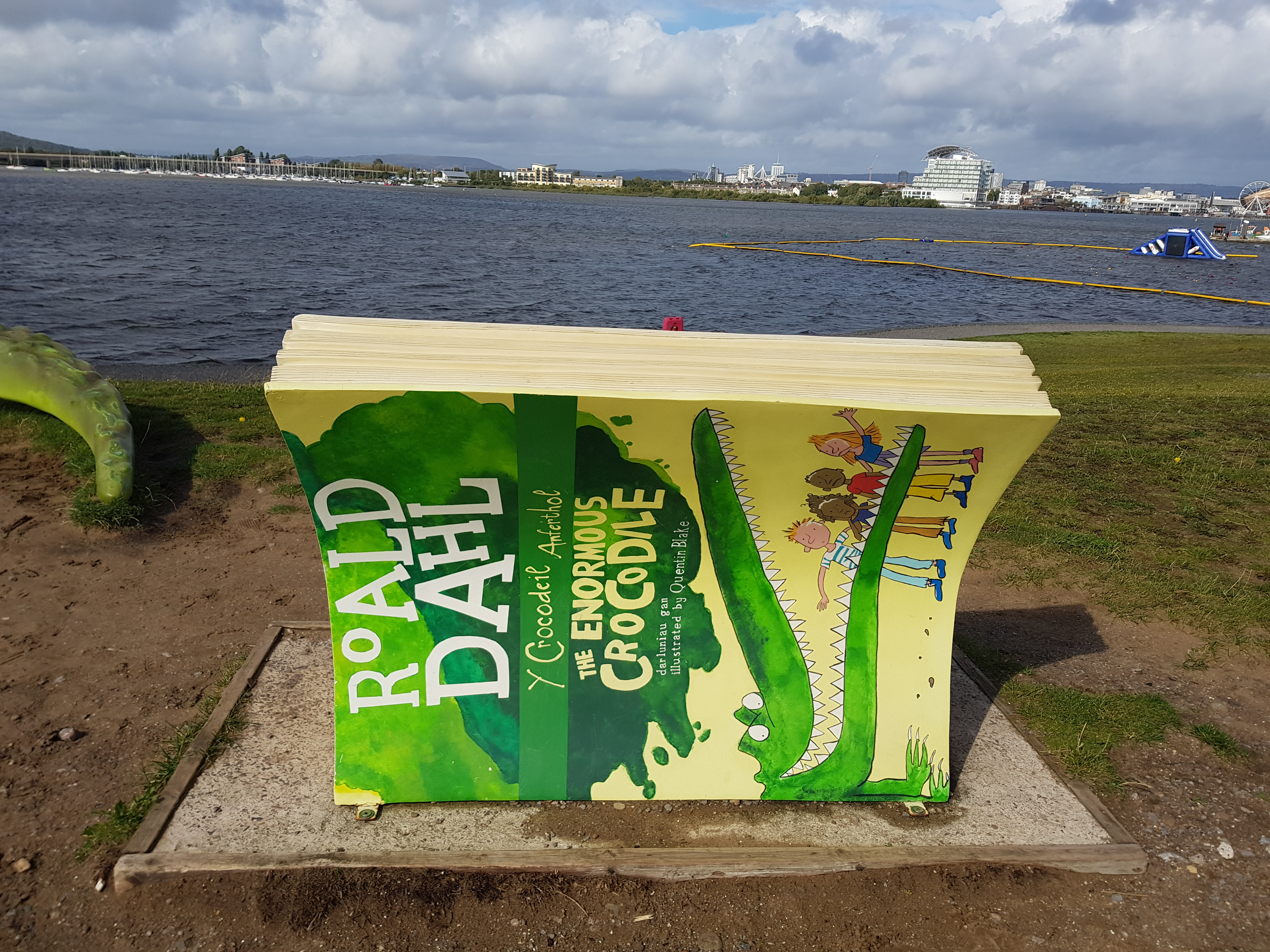
The Enormous Crocodile, Cardiff, designed in a Quentin Blake-esque style to honour his work on the book of the same name

==== Quentin Blake Centre for Illustration ====
Blake is the Founding Trustee of House of Illustration, a centre in London for exhibitions, educational events and activities related to the art of illustration. He was also the subject of the first exhibition at this venue, entitled Inside Stories", which opened in July 2014. In August 2020, it was announced that the centre will be relocating to the 18th-century Engine House at New River Head in the Clerkenwell area of London and will be renamed the Quentin Blake Centre for Illustration. The centre houses two spaces for temporary exhibitions, and one space showcasing Blake's archive. There is also a library, café, shop, creative studio, project space and public gardens. The inaugural exhibition was MURUGIAH: Ever Feel Like..., a solo exhibition of British-Sri Lankan artist MURUGIAH. Part of the centres work is working with local community partners, including a refugee and asylum-seeker centre, a housing centre for vulnerable women, a mental-health unit and the Peel Institute's older adult's group. They also have an access advisory panel. For children, they have a schools programme and provide online resources about illustration.

== Honours and awards ==
Blake has received many honours and awards for his work, including:

- 1980: Kate Greenaway Medal, the Library Association, for Mister Magnolia. For the 50th anniversary of the Medal (1955–2005), a panel of experts named it one of the top ten winning works, which composed the ballot for a public election of the nation's favourite.
  - He was also a highly commended Greenaway runner-up (Note: Today there are usually eight books on the Greenaway Medal shortlist. According to CCSU, some runners-up through 2002 were Commended (from 1959) or Highly Commended (from 1974). There were 99 commendations of both kinds in 44 years including two for 1979 (Blake highly commended) and two for 1995 (one highly).) for The Wild Washerwomen: A new folk tale, by John Yeoman (1979), and a commended runner-up for Clown (1995), which he wrote himself. He made the Greenaway shortlist for Zagazoo (1998), which he wrote, and for Sad Book (2004) by Michael Rosen.
- 1990: Kurt Maschler Award, Maschler Publications and Booktrust, for All Join In (1990).
- 1999-2001: British Children's Laureate.
- 2001: Elected as an Honorary Fellow of the Royal Academy of Arts.
- 2002: Hans Christian Andersen Award from the International Board on Books for Young People, for his career contribution to children's literature.
- 2005: Appointed Commander of the Order of the British Empire (CBE) in the 2005 New Year Honours for his services to children's literature.
- 2002: Appointed Knight of the Ordre des Arts et des Lettres (France); 2007: elevated to Officer.
- 2011: Prince Philip Designers Prize
- 2012: Eleanor Farjeon Award, Children's Book Circle.
- 2013: Knighted in the 2013 New Year Honours for his services to illustration.
- 2013: Elected a Fellow of the Royal Society of Literature.
- 2014: Insignia of a Chevalier de la Légion d'honneur.
- Companion of the Guild of St George.
- 2022: Appointed Member of the Order of the Companions of Honour (CH) in the 2022 Birthday Honours for services to illustration.

== Personal life ==
Blake has never married and has no children. He lives in South Kensington, West London.

== Selected works ==
The following books were both written and illustrated by Blake:

- Patrick (Jonathan Cape, 1968)
- Jack and Nancy (Cape, 1969)
- Angelo (Cape, 1970)
- Snuff (Cape, 1973)
- Lester at the Seaside (William Collins, Sons, 1975)
- Lester and the Unusual Pet (Collins, 1975)
- The Adventures of Lester (BBC, 1977)
- Mister Magnolia (Cape, 1980) —winner of the Kate Greenaway Medal
- Quentin Blake's Nursery Rhyme Book (Cape, 1983)
- The Story of the Dancing Frog (Cape, 1984)
- Mrs Armitage On Wheels (Cape, 1987)
- Quentin Blake's ABC (Cape, 1989)
- All Join In (Cape, 1990) —winner of the Kurt Maschler Award for integrated text and illustration
- Cockatoos (Cape, 1992)
- Simpkin (Cape, 1993)
- The Quentin Blake Book of Nonsense Verse (Viking Press, 1994)
- Clown (Cape, 1995) —commended runner-up for the Greenaway Medal
- La Vie de la Page (Gallimard, 1995)
- Mrs Armitage and the Big Wave (Cape, 1997)
- Dix Grenouilles (Ten Frogs) (Gallimard, 1997)
- The Green Ship (Cape, 1998)
- Zagazoo (Cape, 1998)
- Zap! The Quentin Blake Guide to Electrical Safety (Eastern Electricity, 1998)
- Fantastic Daisy Artichoke (Cape, 1999)
- The Twelve Days of Christmas (Correspondence) (Atlantic Books, 1999)
- The Laureate's Party (Random House, 2000)
- Un Bateau Dans le Ciel (Rue du Monde, 2000)
- Words and Pictures (Cape, 2000)
- Tell Me a Picture (National Gallery, 2001)
- Loveykins (Cape, 2002)
- Laureate's Progress (Cape, 2002)
- Mrs Armitage, Queen of the Road (Cape, 2003)
- A Sailing Boat In The Sky (Random House: Red Fox, 2003)
- Angel Pavement (Cape, 2004)
- You're Only Young Twice (Andersen Press, 2008)
- Daddy Lost his Head (Andre Bouchard, 2009)
- Quentin Blake: Beyond the Page (Tate Publishing Ltd, 2012)

Blake has illustrated at least 17 books by Roald Dahl.

He also illustrated the British edition of Agaton Sax, a Swedish-language series of comedy detective novels by Nils-Olof Franzén (originally illustrated by Åke Lewerth, 1955 to 1978).

- Agaton Sax and the Diamond Thieves, 1965
- Agaton Sax and the Scotland Yard Mystery, 1969
- Agaton Sax and the Max Brothers (a.k.a. Bank Robbers), 1970
- Agaton Sax and the Criminal Doubles, 1971
- Agaton Sax and the Colossus of Rhodes, 1972
- Agaton Sax and the London Computer Plot, 1973
- Agaton Sax and the League of Silent Exploders, 1974
- Agaton Sax and the Haunted House, 1975
- Agaton Sax and the Big Rig (extended), 1976
- Agaton Sax and Lispington's Grandfather Clock, 1978

Other

- The Learning Journey —National Curriculum, key stages 1 and 2, illustrated editions for parents
- Three Little Monkeys 2016, illustrated by Emma Chichester Clark
- Three Little Monkeys Ride Again 2019, illustrated by Emma Chichester Clark
- Three Little Monkeys at Christmas 2021, illustrated by Emma Chichester Clark
- Three Little Monkeys and the Grand Hotel 2023, illustrated by Emma Chichester Clark
- Liliana the Strong 2025, illustrated by Emma Chichester Clark

== Notes ==
Cultural offices
| Preceded by New post | Children's Laureate of the United Kingdom; 1999–2001 | Succeeded by Anne Fine |
