= The Shape of Me and Other Stuff =

Book by Dr. Seuss

- Hardcover cover
- Author: Dr. Seuss
- Illustrator: Dr. Seuss
- Language: English
- Genre: Children's literature
- Publisher: Random House
- Publication date: July 12, 1973 (renewed in 2001)
- Publication place: United States
- Media type: Print (hardcover)
- Pages: 36
- ISBN: 978-0394826875
- Preceded by: Marvin K. Mooney Will You Please Go Now!
- Followed by: Did I Ever Tell You How Lucky You Are?

The Shape of Me and Other Stuff is a children's book written and illustrated by Theodor Geisel under the pen name Dr. Seuss and published by Random House on July 12, 1973.

== Plot ==
This book is done entirely in silhouette, exploring the different shapes of objects.

The characters of two children, a boy and a girl are in dialogue about shapes. The two exchange their thoughts on how different shapes and objects are from each other. They exchange ideas of how big and small some objects are. In the end, they reach a realisation that no shape is exactly the same as the other. They even try to imagine themselves in different shapes (bodies).

They also conclude by being content with the way they are shaped. This suggests that they would not be happier in any other shape.
