= The Cat's Quizzer =

1976 book by Dr. Seuss

- Hardcover cover
- Author: Dr. Seuss
- Illustrator: Dr. Seuss
- Cover artist: Dr. Seuss
- Language: English
- Genre: Children's literature
- Published: August 12, 1976 (renewed in 2004); February 1993 (reissue); Random House
- Publication place: United States
- Media type: Print (hardcover)
- Pages: 72
- ISBN: 978-0394832968
- Preceded by: Oh, the Thinks You Can Think!
- Followed by: I Can Read with My Eyes Shut!

The Cat's Quizzer is a children's book written and illustrated by Theodor Geisel under the pen name Dr. Seuss and published by Random House on August 12, 1976.

In March 2021, the book was withdrawn from publication by Dr. Seuss Enterprises due to images in the book that the estate deemed "hurtful and wrong".

== Plot ==
In the beginning of the book, the Cat in the Hat introduces the reader to Ziggy and Zizzy Zozzfozzel, saying that they both got 100%, but got every answer wrong, and then asks the reader the recurring question "are you smarter than a Zozzfozzel"? The questions in the book range from simple queries to questions difficult enough to wear the Cat out.

== Withdrawal from publication ==
On March 2, 2021, Dr. Seuss Enterprises discontinued the publication of six books, including The Cat's Quizzer, due to the presence of imagery they found "hurtful and wrong". Among the reasons for the withdrawal of The Cat's Quizzer was an illustration of a yellow figure in a conical hat, accompanied by the question, "How old do you have to be to be a Japanese?"

== See also ==
- The Cat in the Hat, original 1957 book
