= Hunches in Bunches =

1982 children's book by Dr. Seuss

- Hardcover cover
- Author: Dr. Seuss
- Illustrator: Dr. Seuss
- Language: English
- Genre: Children's literature
- Publisher: Random House
- Publication date: October 12, 1982
- Publication place: United States
- Media type: Print (hardcover)
- Pages: 48
- ISBN: 978-0394855028
- Preceded by: Oh Say Can You Say?
- Followed by: The Butter Battle Book

Hunches in Bunches is a children's book written by Dr. Seuss and published by Random House on October 12, 1982. The book uses playful language and rhymes.

== Plot ==
A young boy contemplating what activity to do is confronted with a multitude of choices, each represented by various 'hunches'—colorful, whimsical creatures that embody different impulses and decisions. These hunches pull him in multiple directions, suggesting everything from eating a snack, going outside, sitting and thinking, to engaging in bizarre or procrastinative behaviors. As the boy grapples with these conflicting suggestions, he experiences decision paralysis. The story culminates in the boy learning to listen to his own 'real' hunch, guiding him to make a decision that aligns with his true desires, highlighting the importance of inner guidance amidst external chaos.
