= Oceanhouse Media =

Oceanhouse Media, Inc.
- Type: Private
- Industry: Mobile apps
- Genre: Children's books, self help
- Founder: Michel Kripalani; Karen Kripalani
- Headquarters: Encinitas, California, U.S.
- Website: oceanhousemedia.com

Oceanhouse Media, Inc. is a publisher of iOS, Android and Windows 8 apps. Their offerings include digital book apps from brands such as Dr. Seuss, The Berenstain Bears and Little Critter, as well as self-improvement apps from Hay House authors, and Chicken Soup for the Soul. Oceanhouse Media was founded in January 2009 by Michel and Karen Kripalani in Encinitas, California. The company released its first iOS app, Bowls – Authentic Tibetan Singing Bowls, on the Apple App Store in March 2009. Oceanhouse Media currently has licensing agreements in place with Dr. Seuss Enterprises, Hay House, Mercer Mayer, HarperCollins, Random House, Houghton Mifflin Harcourt Publishing Company, Chronicle Books, Chicken Soup for the Soul and many others.

== Products ==
Oceanhouse Media has published more than 350 apps for iOS devices, ranging from $0.99 to US$15.00, as well as several free apps. The company also has more than 160 Android apps available on Google Play and the Amazon App Store.

=== omBook® ===
Oceanhouse Media possesses the registered trademark omBook® for its Oceanhouse Media digital book apps for children.

== Brands ==
Oceanhouse Media has released apps from the following brands:

- Dr. Seuss
- The Cat in the Hat's Learning Library
- The Berenstain Bears
- Little Critter, by Mercer Mayer
- Smithsonian Institution
- Ziggy Marley
- Once Upon a Potty
- Rudolph the Red-Nosed Reindeer
- Chicken Soup for the Soul
- Hay House authors such as Louise L. Hay, Dr. Wayne W. Dyer, Doreen Virtue, Deepak Chopra, and others.

== Parents' choice awards ==
Oceanhouse Media apps have been recognized by several Parents' Choice Awards.

=== Parents' Choice Award: Gold ===
- Ice Is Nice! (Dr. Seuss/Cat in the Hat), Fall 2013
- On Beyond Bugs (Dr. Seuss/Cat in the Hat), Fall 2013

=== Parents' Choice Award: Silver ===
- The Cat in the Hat – Dr. Seuss, Spring 2010
- Dr. Seuss's ABC, Spring 2011
- Green Eggs and Ham – Dr. Seuss, Spring 2011
- Oh, the Thinks You Can Think! – Dr. Seuss, Fall 2011
- Oh Say Can You Say Di-no-saur? (Dr. Seuss/Cat in the Hat), Fall 2012
- Trains - Byron Barton, Spring 2013
- A Whale of a Tale! (Dr. Seuss/Cat in the Hat), Spring 2013
