= Did I Ever Tell You How Lucky You Are? =

1956 book by Dr. Seuss

- Hardcover cover
- Author: Dr. Seuss
- Illustrator: Dr. Seuss
- Language: English
- Genre: Children's literature
- Publisher: Random House
- Publication date: September 12, 1973 (renewed in 2001)
- Publication place: United States
- Media type: Print (hardcover)
- Pages: 64
- ISBN: 978-0394827193
- Preceded by: The Shape of Me and Other Stuff
- Followed by: There's a Wocket in My Pocket

Did I Ever Tell You How Lucky You Are? is a children's book written and illustrated by Theodor Geisel under the pen name Dr. Seuss and published by Random House on September 12, 1973.

An unrelated poem by Seuss titled "Did I Ever Tell You..?" was published in Redbook magazine in February 1956. (Note: This poem is sometimes referred to by the alternate title "The Zode in the Road".)

== Plot ==
The text consists of a series of descriptive poems, fictively told to an unnamed listener by a wise old man. The man describes a variety of whimsically wretched characters and unfortunate situations, in comparison with which the listener might be considered exceptionally fortunate.

== Adaptations ==
An audio version by John Cleese was nominated for a Grammy Award for Best Spoken Word Album for Children in 1994.
