= Dr. Seuss's Sleep Book =

1962 children's book by Dr. Seuss

- Author: Dr. Seuss
- Illustrator: Dr. Seuss
- Language: English
- Publisher: Random House
- Publication date: August 12, 1962 (renewed in 1990)
- Publication place: United States
- Pages: 56
- ISBN: 978-0-394-80091-2
- OCLC: 181508
- Dewey Decimal: 811
- LC Class: PZ8.3.G276 Do
- Preceded by: The Sneetches and Other Stories
- Followed by: Hop on Pop

Dr. Seuss's Sleep Book, also known as The Sleep Book, is an American children's book written by Dr. Seuss in 1962. The story centers on the activity of sleep as readers follow the journey of many different characters preparing to slip into a deep slumber. This book documents the different sleeping activities that some of the creatures join in on: Jo and Mo Redd-Zoff participate in competitive sleep talking and a group "near Finnigan Fen" enjoys group sleepwalking. It opens with a small bug, named Van Vleck, yawning. This single yawn sets off a chain reaction, effectively putting "ninety-nine zillion nine trillion and two" creatures to sleep.

== Summary ==
The book is written in the style of a reporter on the news who is reporting on the number of sleepers in the world. The book starts with a "very small bug" named Van Vleck yawning. The narrator then tells the reader that this is very important news and goes on to explain that a yawn is contagious and will cause sleep across the countryside.

The narrator then takes us around the world to various locations where people are going to sleep, such as Herk-Heimer Falls, the Castle of Krupp, and the towns of Culppeper Springs and Mercedd. Various silly groups of people go to sleep together, such as a "Hinkle Horn Honking Club". Various creatures go to sleep too, such as a Collapsible Frink and the Chippendale Mupp. The narrator explains that they count the number of people and creatures asleep using an "Audio Telly O-Tally O-Count" which spies on people to know when they went to bed.

The narrator then explores the latest news in the sports of sleeptalking and sleepwalking before returning to the previous standard of discussing various locations (such as the Zwieback Motel and the District of Dofft) and creatures such as the Foona Lagoona Baboona and a Jedd. Then the book explains that "Ninety Nine Zillion, Nine Trillion and Two" creatures are asleep and then asks "What about you?" The final line of the book is a "Good night", which is unmetered.

== Genre ==
Similarly to his other books, Dr. Seuss's Sleep Book is a fictional book classified under children’s literature and characterized by its rhythmic sequence. His illustrations are known to depict a wide variety of unique creatures and odd relationships.

Dr. Seuss uses his standard red yellow and turquoise colors, only deviating from this pattern to add hints of purple and one orange Moose Juice alongside a green Goose Juice.

== Analysis ==
The Sleep Book sets a good example for young kids on the proper hygiene methods used before bedtime such as brushing their teeth, putting their things away, and making sure their alarm is set for the morning. It has also popularly been used in Pre-K through Grade 1 to help kids with the pronunciation of their "sl" sounds.

Throughout this story, Dr. Seuss introduces his young audience to a number of sleep related habits and activities: dreaming, sleep talking, sleep walking, yawning, and snoring. The book specifically indicates that it must be "read in bed" because of its ability to put kids to sleep.

== Reception ==
Parents have praised Dr. Seuss's Sleep Book for its soothing rhythmic element that helps their children fall asleep. This children's book is said to be a top choice for parents to read to their kids at night due to its soothing rhythm and "timeless story". Additionally, Verlo reviewed Dr. Seuss’s Sleep Book, commenting on its "relaxing" methods that effectively put children to sleep calmly and easily. One article praised Dr. Seuss's ability to write to the younger audience "without condescension" and reasoned this factor to be his backing for such great success. During Read Across America Week, organizations such as the CPSD celebrate Dr. Seuss Day by reading The Sleep Book.

== Changes from earlier drafts ==
Dr. Seuss's Sleep Book went through several iterations before the final draft was cemented. In an early draft, the County of Keck was named the County of Teck and Van Vleck, Van Geck. In another draft, the book included a stanza which reads:

A report just came in from the Island of Krox

That a Snidd has taken off both of his socks

And has hung them with care on the edge of his chair

And is now fast asleep with a rose in his hair

In another draft, the narrator is from "The Nightly News about just who's taking their nightly snooze".
