= Jonathan Cott =

American author

- Born: New York City
- Education: Columbia University
- Occupations: Journalist, author, and editor

Jonathan Cott is an American author, journalist, and editor. Much of his work focuses on music, embracing both classical and rock. He has been a contributing editor at Rolling Stone since the magazine's founding, and has written for The New York Times, The New Yorker, and other publications.

Cott grew up in New York City, the son of television executive Ted Cott and Jean Cahan. He recalled a formative experience: “At the age of thirteen—filled with typical adolescent turmoil and angst—I heard Glenn Gould’s recording of the Goldberg Variations and attained what I took to be a moment of musical, emotional, and spiritual enlightenment.” He would later interview Gould for Rolling Stone.

He received a B.A. from Columbia University in 1964, and an M.A. from The University of California, Berkeley in 1966. He spent the late 1960s in London, where he began a long friendship with John Lennon and Yoko Ono. Cott was the last journalist to interview Lennon, three days before his death.

In 1970, he became a contributing editor at Rolling Stone, where he specialized in interviews, many of which were later collected in his 2020 book Listening. Writer Jan Morris called him "an incomparable interviewer," and Studs Terkel is quoted as saying that "Jonathan Cott, as an interviewer, reveals truths of creative spirits." Cott wrote often about Bob Dylan, eventually producing two books about Dylan. In The New York Times, Janet Maslin called Cott "arguably the most simpatico writer ever to converse with Mr. Dylan."

In addition to rock music, Cott has also written extensively on children's books, editing the 1985 collection Beyond the Looking Glass: Extraordinary Works of Fairy Tale and Fantasy and writing the 1983 book Pipers at the Gates of Dawn: The Wisdom of Children’s Literature. He collaborated with Maurice Sendak on a collection of Victorian picture books, and later wrote a biography of Sendak, There's a Mystery There: The Primal Vision of Maurice Sendak (2019).

Cott suffered for years from bipolar disorder. His mother's death in 1988 set off a period of clinical depression, which led him to two years of electroconvulsive therapy (ECT). After 36 treatments, he no longer remembered anything from 1985 to 2000. He spent the next years of his life piecing his memories back together, a quest that he wrote about in his 2005 book On the Sea of Memory: A Journey From Forgetting to Remembering. Asked in a Salon interview whether he was shocked by anything he learned, Cott replied, "Well, I was overjoyed to hear about the end of apartheid. I was really upset, but more on a personal level, when I heard that Glenn Gould had died, or that John Lennon had died, or that Bob Marley had died – people whom I cherished, poets I had admired. I found out they had died at the same time. They all died at once."

== Works ==
Author:

- He Dreams What Is Going On Inside His Head (1973)
- Stockhausen: Conversations with the Composer (1973)
- Forever Young (1978)
- Charms (1981)
- Pipers at the Gates of Dawn: The Wisdom of Children’s Literature (1983)
- Conversations with Glenn Gould (1984)
- Dylan (1984)
- Visions and Voices (1987)
- Search for Omm Sety: A Story of Eternal Love (1987)
- Wandering Ghost: The Odyssey of Lafcadio Hearn (1991)
- Isis and Osiris (1994)
- Thirteen: A Journey Into the Number (1996)
- Homelands (2000)
- Back to a Shadow in the Night: Music Writings and Interviews—1968–2001 (2003)
- On the Sea of Memory: A Journey From Forgetting to Remembering (2005)
- Bob Dylan: The Essential Interviews (2006)
- Dinner with Lenny: The Last Long Interview with Leonard Bernstein (2013)
- Days That I’ll Remember: Spending Time with John Lennon and Yoko Ono (2013)
- There's a Mystery There: The Primal Vision of Maurice Sendak (2017)
- Listening: Interviews, 1970–1989 (2020)
- Let Me Take You Down: Penny Lane and Strawberry Fields Forever (2024)

Editor:

- The Roses Race Around Her Name: Poems From Fathers to Daughters (1974)
- Victorian Color Picture Books (with Maurice Sendak) (1983)
- Beyond the Looking Glass: Extraordinary Works of Fairy Tale and Fantasy (1985)
- Skies in Blossom: The Nature Poetry of Emily Dickinson (1995)
