= Marvin K. Mooney Will You Please Go Now! =

1972 book by Dr. Seuss

- Author: Dr. Seuss
- Illustrator: Dr. Seuss
- Language: English
- Genre: Children's literature
- Publisher: Random House
- Publication date: August 12, 1972 (renewed in 2000)
- Publication place: United States
- Media type: Print (hardcover and paperback)
- ISBN: 0-394-82490-3
- OCLC: 314222
- Dewey Decimal: [E]
- LC Class: PZ8.3.G276 Mar
- Preceded by: The Lorax
- Followed by: The Shape of Me and Other Stuff

Marvin K. Mooney Will You Please Go Now! is a 1972 children's book by Dr. Seuss. It is part of the "Beginner Book" line and is aimed at children who cannot yet read at the level of more advanced beginning books such as The Cat in the Hat.

== Plot ==
A boy named Marvin K. Mooney is shown standing on a rug as the unseen narrator commands him to "go". The narrator then offers a series of outlandish suggestions for how Marvin might leave. Eventually, Marvin obeys, choosing to exit on foot, and the narrator waves goodbye. It is never clarified where Marvin is being told to go.

== In political culture ==
At the height of the Watergate scandal, in a July 1974 collaboration with political humorist Art Buchwald, Dr. Seuss took a two-year-old copy of his book, crossed out "Marvin K. Mooney" wherever it occurred and wrote in "Richard M. Nixon". With Dr. Seuss's consent, Buchwald and his editors reprinted the markup as a newspaper column, published on July 30. Nixon resigned ten days later on August 9.

In Maureen Dowd's column for The New York Times, "Wilting over Waffles", dated April 23, 2008, she suggests that Democrats in the 2008 presidential election might take a cue from this book in their approach to Hillary Clinton's prolonged campaign against Barack Obama, asking her to "just go. I don't care how". MEP Daniel Hannan quoted the book in reference to Gordon Brown following the 2009 European Parliament election.

The same idea has also been applied to Hosni Mubarak during the 2011 Egyptian revolution and Donald Trump during and after both the 2016 United States presidential election and the 2020 United States presidential election.
