= Mr. Brown Can Moo! Can You? =

1970 book by Dr. Seuss

- Board book edition cover
- Author: Dr. Seuss
- Illustrator: Dr. Seuss
- Language: English
- Genre: Children's literature
- Publisher: Random House
- Publication date: August 12, 1970 (renewed in 1998)
- Publication place: United States
- Media type: Print (hardcover)
- Pages: 24
- ISBN: 978-0679882824
- Preceded by: I Can Draw It Myself
- Followed by: The Lorax

Mr. Brown Can Moo! Can You? is a children's book written and illustrated by Theodor Geisel under the pen name Dr. Seuss and first published by Random House in 1970.

== Plot ==
The story follows a man named Mr. Brown, who can make a wide variety of sounds, imitating the sounds of animals and inanimate objects. The narrator recites a list of items and animals that Mr. Brown can sound like, each one accompanied by illustrations of the object and an onomatopoeia, which replicates the sound he can make.

Mr. Brown can make the "moo" of a cow, the "buzz" of a bee, the "pop" of a cork (on a bottle of grape wine), the "klopp klopp" of a horse's hooves, the "eek eek" like a shoe, the "cock a doodle doo" of a rooster, the "hoo hoo" of an owl, the "dibble dibble dibble dopp" of rain, the "choo choo" of a train, the "whisper" of a butterfly, the "blurp blurp" of a horn, the "slurp slurp" of a cat drinking, the "tick tock" of a clock, the "knock knock" of a hand against a door, the "sizzle sizzle" of an egg in a frying pan, the "grum grum" of a hippopotomus chewing gum, the "pip" of a goldfish kiss, the "boom" of thunder, and the "splatt" of lightning.

The narrator concludes the list by suggesting that the reader try to make these same sounds, and the last pages of text feature a list of all the onomatopoeias featured in the book.
