= Hop on Pop =

1963 children's book by Dr. Seuss

- Author: Dr. Seuss
- Illustrator: Dr. Seuss
- Language: English
- Genre: Children's literature
- Publisher: Random House, The Living Books Company (1998)
- Publication date: February 12, 1963 (Renewed in 1991)
- Publication place: United States
- ISBN: 978-0-394-80029-5
- Preceded by: Dr. Seuss's Sleep Book
- Followed by: Dr. Seuss's ABC

Hop on Pop is a 1963 children's picture book by Dr. Seuss (Theodor Seuss Geisel), published as part of the Random House Beginner Books series. The book is subtitled "The Simplest Seuss for Youngest Use", and is designed to introduce basic phonics concepts to children.

== History ==
One of Geisel's manuscript drafts for the book contained the lines, "When I read I am smart / I always cut whole words apart. / Con Stan Tin O Ple, Tim Buk Too / Con Tra Cep Tive, Kan Ga Roo". Geisel had included the contraceptive reference to ensure that publisher Bennett Cerf was reading the manuscript. Cerf did notice the line, and the poem was changed to the following: "My father / can read / big words, too. / Like... / Constantinople / and / Timbuktu".

== Reception ==
A popular choice of elementary school teachers and children's librarians, Hop on Pop ranked sixteenth on Publishers Weekly's 2001 list of the all-time best-selling hardcover books for children. Based on a 2007 online poll, the National Education Association reported the book as being No. 67 on their list of "Teachers' Top 100 Books for Children".

One of Hop on Pop’s most notable advocates is former United States First Lady Laura Bush, who listed the book as her favorite in a 2006 interview with The Wall Street Journal. Bush said this book with its illustrations and rhymes delighted her and her husband George and their daughters Barbara and Jenna after reading it.

In 2013, an official complaint was made to the Toronto Public Library, which claimed that the book "encouraged children to use violence against their fathers". The library decided against removing the book, finding it a humorous and well-loved children's book designed to engage children while teaching them reading skills.

== See also ==
- Seussical
