= I Can Read with My Eyes Shut! =

1978 book by Dr. Seuss

- Author: Dr. Seuss
- Illustrator: Dr. Seuss
- Cover artist: Dr. Seuss
- Language: English
- Genre: Children's literature
- Publisher: Random House
- Publication date: November 12, 1978 (renewed in 1986)
- Publication place: United States
- Media type: Print (hardcover)
- Pages: 48
- ISBN: 978-0-3948-3912-7
- Preceded by: The Cat's Quizzer
- Followed by: Oh Say Can You Say?

I Can Read with My Eyes Shut! is a children's book written and illustrated by Theodor Geisel under the pen name Dr. Seuss and first published by Random House on November 12, 1978. In the book, the Cat in the Hat shows his son Young Cat the fun he can get out of reading, and also shows that reading is a useful way of gaining knowledge, and the thrill of the ways to read.

== History ==
This book was written after Seuss' vision began to fade, and he started wearing glasses. The book is dedicated to "David Worthen, E.G. (Eye Guy)", who was his ophthalmologist.

== Plot ==
The Cat in the Hat shows his protégé, Young Cat, that while reading with one's eyes closed can be amazing, it can be a strain. When one reads with their eyes open, they will be able to learn a large amount of wonderful things, some of which are shown through illustrations.

== See also ==
- The Cat in the Hat, original 1957 book
