= Oh, the Thinks You Can Think! =

1975 book by Dr. Seuss

- Hardcover cover
- Author: Dr. Seuss
- Illustrator: Dr. Seuss
- Language: English
- Genre: Children's literature
- Publisher: Random House
- Publication date: August 12, 1975 (renewed in 2003)
- Publication place: United States
- Media type: Print (hardcover)
- Pages: 24
- ISBN: 978-0375857942
- Preceded by: There's a Wocket in My Pocket!
- Followed by: The Cat's Quizzer

Oh, the Thinks You Can Think! is a children's book written and illustrated by Theodor Geisel under the pen name Dr. Seuss and published by Random House on August 21, 1975. The book is about the many amazing 'thinks' one can think and the endless possibilities and dreams that imagination can create. The book's front cover depicts forty-seven unknown bird-like creatures walking around on a cyan circle.

"Oh, the Thinks You Can Think!" is also the name of a song in the musical play Seussical, which is based partly on this book.

== Plot ==
The book begins with a reader thinking about colors or animals that they know, like birds, or horses, but as quickly as page three he asks the reader to think of something completely made up; a GUFF. A Guff is a sort of puffy fluff. Next, he thinks up a dessert. Of all the made up things in this image the focus is on the dessert. Other than that it is beautiful and has a cherry on top. After thinking of colors and known animals, then made up animals and made up dessert he moves on to made up activities, like Kitty O'Sullivan Krauss's balloon swimming pool. After Seuss presents the reader with various things to think up, he then moves on to questions the readers should ask themselves, such as how much water can fifty-five elephants drink or what if someone meets a JIBBOO. There is no explanation for what a JIBBOO is, as there is a sketchy image leaving the audience to wonder and think up a story for the JIBBOO.

In typical Seuss fashion things get busier and more colorful at the end. He fills the page with many crazy creatures and much activity when he asks the reader why so many things go to the right. This causes the reader's eyes to scan the page taking in every detail until she is finally willing to turn the page. The final page is a busier and more colorful version of the first page, with bird-like creatures walking along a curved path, breaking the laws of gravity just as the text breaks the rules of reading left to right.

== Legacy ==
In the 2008 American animated film Horton Hears a Who!, Zongs (lizard-like creatures) appear as residents of the Jungle of Nool.
