= Scrambled Eggs Super! =

1953 book by Dr. Seuss

- Author: Dr. Seuss
- Illustrator: Dr. Seuss
- Language: English
- Genre: Children's literature
- Publisher: Random House
- Publication date: November 11, 1953
- Publication place: United States
- Media type: Print (hardcover)
- Pages: 64
- ISBN: 978-0-394-80085-1
- Preceded by: If I Ran the Zoo
- Followed by: Horton Hears a Who!

Scrambled Eggs Super! is a discontinued 1953 children's book written and illustrated by American children's author Dr. Seuss. The story is told from the point of view of a boy named Peter T. Hooper, who makes scrambled eggs prepared from eggs belonging to various exotic birds. It is the only children's book by Dr. Seuss to be in the public domain due to a lack of a copyright renewal.

== Plot ==
At the beginning of the story, Peter T. Hooper brags to his sister, Liz, in their mother's kitchen about what a good cook he is. He tells the story of how, when he is tired of the taste of regular scrambled eggs using hen's eggs, he decided to scramble eggs from other birds. He tells of how he travelled great distances and discovered a variety of exotic birds and their eggs.

He explains his criteria for choosing some eggs, because of their sweetness, and avoiding others. He takes the eggs home but decides that he still needs more, and he calls on the help of some of his friends from around the world, including a "fellow named Ali". After each bird Peter finds he states the phrase "Scrambled Eggs Super Dee Dooper Dee Booper Special Deluxe a la Peter T. Hooper".

== Critical reception ==
Ruth C. Barlow of the Christian Science Monitor called Scrambled Eggs Super! a "gay extravaganza". The book was also praised by Chicago Sunday Tribune and The New York Herald Tribune for Seuss's illustrations of the birds.

In the book Dr. Seuss: American Icon, Philip Nel wrote that Scrambled Eggs Super! was one of Seuss's less politically oriented books.

== Withdrawal from publication ==
On March 2, 2021, Dr. Seuss Enterprises ceased publication of Scrambled Eggs Super! and five other Dr. Seuss titles due to "hurtful and wrong" depictions of people. The offending portrayals in Scrambled Eggs Super! were believed to be a character named Ali, who wears a turban, and figures from the fictional Arctic land of Fa-Zoal, who wear furs and paddle a canoe.
