= The Bippolo Seed and Other Lost Stories =

2011 book of 1950s stories by Dr. Seuss

- Author: Dr. Seuss
- Genre: Children's literature
- Publisher: Redbook (magazines); Random House (book)
- Publication date: June/August/November 1950 ("Gustav the Goldfish", "Tadd and Todd" and "Steak for Supper"); February/June/September/November 1951 ("The Rabbit, the Bear and the Zinniga-Zanniga", "The Bippolo Seed", "The Strange Shirt Spot" and "The Great Henry McBride"); September 27, 2011
- Preceded by: Hooray for Diffendoofer Day!
- Followed by: Horton and the Kwuggerbug and More Lost Stories

The Bippolo Seed and Other Lost Stories is a collection of seven illustrated stories by children's author Dr. Seuss published by Random House on September 27, 2011. Though they were originally published in magazines in the early 1950s, they had never been published in book form and are quite rare, described by the publisher as "the literary equivalent of buried treasure". The stories were discovered by Charles D. Cohen, a Massachusetts dentist and a Seuss scholar and biographer, who also wrote an introduction to the collection.

== Plots ==
The seven stories included in the book are:

- "The Bippolo Seed" (60th-anniversary edition): A young duck named McKluck finds a rare seed that can grow a tree with anything he wishes for. He initially plans to only wish for a week's supply of duck food, but a greedy cat convinces him that they should wish for many more items than they need so that they can sell them and become rich. However, in their excitement, the duo ends up dropping the seed into a body of water by accident and are unable to find it. The story ends by noting that the duo may have been luckier had they not wished for so much.
- "The Rabbit, the Bear, and the Zinniga-Zanniga": A rabbit about to be eaten by a bear manages to escape by convincing him that he has a rare but serious and potentially lethal disorder, the lack of a single eyelash, which he can only cure by holding a flower from a nearby Zinniga-Zanniga tree to his eye while staying still.
- "Gustav the Goldfish": A boy overfeeds his pet goldfish Gustav despite having been told by the man who sold Gustav to never do so. This causes Gustav to begin gradually growing, and he moves throughout the house as the boy tries and fails to contain him, until he eventually fills a cellar and must be cured by his original seller. The boy resolves never to overfeed Gustav again after he is returned to his normal size. This story was adapted in 1961 by Helen Palmer as A Fish out of Water.
- "Tadd and Todd": A boy named Tadd is frustrated because no one can tell him apart from his identical twin brother, Todd, so he tries to distinguish himself by enhancing his appearance with many accessories, but his attempts are foiled by Todd, who still replicates his appearance exactly as he enjoys being "like two peas in a pod". In the end, Todd finally gets Tadd to accept the fact that they will always be the same and Tadd starts to enjoy being an identical twin.
- "Steak for Supper": A boy on his way home on a Saturday brags to himself about his weekly steak dinner, causing a growing group of strange creatures who hear the statement to follow him home for some steak, each successively inviting another creature, concerning the boy, who increasingly regrets his bragging. When they get home, they discover that the boy's family got stew instead by mistake and all of the creatures leave in disgust, much to the boy's relief, and he resolves to follow his father's advice to "button his lips".
- "The Strange Shirt Spot": A boy gets dirt on his brand-new white shirt and fears his mother's disapproval. After several attempts to get rid of the dirt, he only manages to pass it between objects throughout the house, eventually returning it to his shirt by accident just before his mother arrives and reprimands him.
- "The Great Henry McBride": A boy named Henry McBride dreams of what job he may do when he is older. His imagination gets increasingly ambitious as he imagines doing progressively more jobs simultaneously, culminating in him picturing himself as a rabbit farmer, doctor, radio presenter, seal trainer, and cowpuncher all at once. He concludes that the best job for him at the moment is dreaming without having to do work.

== Publication ==
The collection was published by Random House on September 27, 2011. The stories originally appeared in magazines in 1950 and 1951. Dr. Seuss died in 1991, and the stories were later rediscovered by Charles D. Cohen, a Massachusetts dentist and Seuss scholar. Cathy Goldsmith of Random House encountered the magazine stories in one of Cohen's eBay auctions, around 2001. Random House published Cohen's book The Seuss, the Whole Seuss and Nothing But the Seuss: A Visual Biography of Theodor Seuss Geisel in 2003. He also contributed an introduction to this collection.

== Analysis ==
Some elements of the stories in this collection appeared in later books. The story "Gustav the Goldfish" was the basis for the Beginner Book A Fish Out of Water. The book was written by Seuss's first wife Helen Palmer Geisel, illustrated by P. D. Eastman, and published in 1961. "Gustav the Goldfish" rhymes, unlike A Fish out of Water. Seuss later reused the basic plot of "The Strange Shirt Spot" for 1958's The Cat in the Hat Comes Back. In both stories, a character tries to remove a spot from various household items but only manages to transfer the spot to one object after another.

The story "The Rabbit, the Bear, and the Zinniga-Zanniga" was recorded by Marvin Miller and released on the 1965 album Dr. Seuss presents..."Fox in Socks" and "Green Eggs & Ham" on RCA Records. The rabbit and bear in the story may possibly be the same animals who appear in The Big Brag.

== See also ==
The milkmaid and her pail

== Sources ==
- Nel, Philip (2007). The Annotated Cat: Under the Hats of Seuss And His Cats. New York: Random House. ISBN 978-0-375-83369-4.
