= Political messages of Dr. Seuss =

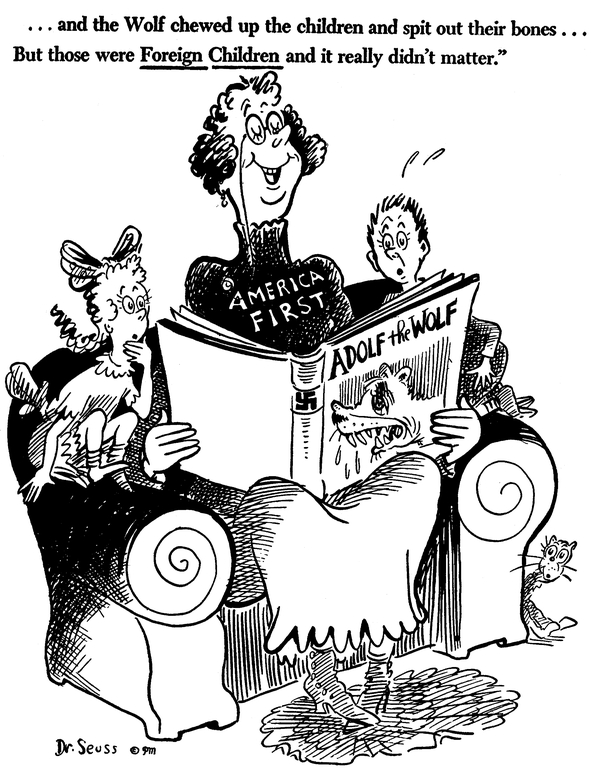
Cartoon by Seuss criticizing the nationalist "America First" policy as being essentially Nazism

The political messages of American children's author and cartoonist Theodor Seuss Geisel, best known as Dr. Seuss, are found in many of his books. Seuss was a liberal and a moralist who expressed his views in his books through the use of ridicule, satire, wordplay, nonsense words, and wild drawings to take aim at bullies, hypocrites, and demagogues.

Earlier in his career, Seuss created political cartoons. Seuss's political ideas can also be found in books such as: The Lorax, Marvin K. Mooney Will You Please Go Now!, The Cat in the Hat, Horton Hears a Who!, Yertle the Turtle, The Sneetches, and The Butter Battle Book. Although his books commonly contain anti-fascist and anti-racist themes, they also commonly utilize racial stereotypes when depicting non-white individuals.

== Editorial cartoons ==
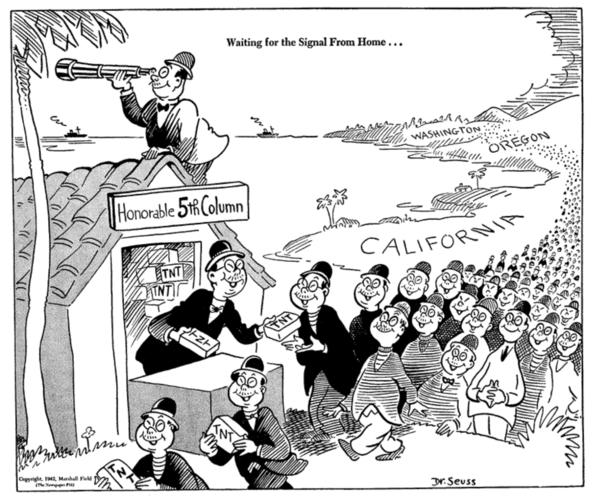
Political cartoon by Dr. Seuss depicting Japanese Americans as sleeper agents ready to attack the United States from within following the attack on Pearl Harbor

While a student at Dartmouth College in the 1920s, Theodor Seuss Geisel drew cartoons for the campus's humor magazine, the Dartmouth Jack-O-Lantern, some of which contain anti-black racist and anti-Semitic elements. His first work signed as "Dr. Seuss", published in 1928, features East Asian stereotypes lampooning Japanese people. From the late 1920s until the early 1940s, Seuss's cartoons (some made for advertisements) variously featured racist depictions of East Asians, Arabs and Muslims, black people, Mexicans, and Native Americans—in addition to misogynist themes. A 1929 cartoon for Judge magazine depicts white men browsing a department store, where they examine a crowd of stereotyped black people labeled as "niggers" for sale, referring to the figure of speech "Nigger in the woodpile" .

Seuss drew over 400 political cartoons for the New York newspaper PM, two years of which he was the chief editorial cartoonist (1941–1943). The cartoons ranged from the topics of opposition to the nationalist "America First" policy, support for U.S. involvement in World War II, and criticizing both Nazi Germany and Japan. In particular, after the attack on Pearl Harbor, he made anti-Japanese cartoons, some of which took aim at Japanese Americans, and Seuss explicitly stated his support for the killing of "Japs." Over 200 of these cartoons have been republished, most of which had not been published anywhere since their original debut. Seuss reportedly later regretted his anti-Japanese sentiment.

== Politics in his children's books ==
=== The Cat in the Hat ===
The Cat in the Hat was written as a challenge in 1954 in response to an article in Life magazine that claimed that widespread illiteracy was caused by children being bored with books. The book had an underlying theme that endorsed rebellion in children.

=== Horton Hears a Who! ===
Horton Hears a Who! was published in 1954, and it was one of Seuss's most successful books. It is said to have many political and social messages, focusing on the powerless. It is sometimes said that Seuss wrote this book as a kind of atonement for his anti-Japanese editorial cartoons during World War II. Seuss visited Japan in 1953 and viewed the aftermath of the atomic bombs; he dedicated the book, published the next year, to a Japanese friend.

The book is famous for the quote, "A person's a person, no matter how small". This quote has been co-opted by many anti-abortion groups. It is unlikely that Seuss intended a political message about abortion, since the book was written in the 1950s while abortion did not become legal (nationally) in the U.S. until the 1970s. He and his widow Audrey objected to the phrase being used in this way because "she doesn't like people to hijack Dr. Seuss characters or material to front their own points of view".

Dr. Seuss also addresses other social issues, such as conformity. Throughout the book, Horton stands out from the rest of the jungle animals. He is very different, and Horton refuses to conform. The key political struggle in Dr. Seuss's lifetime was the struggle against fascism, where strict conformity was a cultural and political requisite.

=== Yertle the Turtle ===
Yertle the Turtle was published in 1958. There are many connections through the book to the rise and fall of Hitler. The book is about how all creatures should be free.

Ultimately, the dictatorial leader, symbolizing Hitler, falls. The book was removed from many schools for being 'too political'. The quote from the book, "I know, up on top you are seeing great sights, but down here on the bottom, we, too, should have rights" was one of the lines identified as a reason for removal of the book from schools, purportedly to protect the children.

=== The Sneetches ===
The Sneetches, written in 1953, has many undertones of opposition to antisemitism, along with opposition to racial and religious bigotry in general. The story of the Sneetches is about yellow, bird-like creatures, with some who have green stars on their stomachs, and others without. The "in" crowd are those who have the stars, and they look down on those who do not have it. This discrimination even runs in their children. One day, a man named McBean comes to town with a machine to give those without a star, a star, with a "star-on machine" for the cost of three dollars. The original Sneetches with the stars are angered because they no longer have a way to show that they are better than those without. McBean comes up with the solution in the form of a star-off machine that will take the stars off the stomach of the Sneetches for the cost of ten dollars. This way, they can differentiate themselves once again and regain their superiority. But after the original plain-belly Sneetches go through the star-off machine too, it gets out of hand with all the Sneetches changing back and forth from having a star and not having a star to the point that, "until neither the Plain nor the Star-Bellies knew / Whether this one was that one or that one was this one / Or which one was what one or what one was who".

Both groups quickly run out of money and McBean leaves town. After he leaves, the Sneetches come to realize that neither the "plain-belly" or "star belly" is superior over the other. There are clear lessons of anti-discrimination and anti-racism throughout the story, with even the star implying a political message. It was inspired by the yellow Star of David that the Jews were required to wear on their clothes to identify them to the Nazis.

=== The Lorax ===
Dr. Seuss's The Lorax appeared in the 1970s at the start of the environmental movement, just before the first anniversary of Earth Day. Dr. Seuss later called The Lorax straight propaganda, a polemic against pollution. The main point of the book is "the basic message of The Lorax deals with ecosystems and the interrelatedness of all parts - living and non-living - as a viable, functioning unit". Environmental impact is told from a simplistic yet environmentally accurate viewpoint, demonstrating the conflict between natural resources and man-made production. The story starts with a man named the Once-ler, telling the story of the local natural history and how it was once home to the Lorax, the one who speaks for the trees because trees have no tongues. This natural habitat, home to the Truffula Trees, was quickly taken advantage of by the greed of the Once-ler. The Once-ler cut down all of the Truffula Trees to make thneeds which he claims everyone needs (a marketing slogan). Through this deforestation and pursuit of economic growth by the Once-ler, the lakes, skies, and land in the area become polluted, all the creatures who inhabit them are forced to leave, and all of the Truffula Trees are cut down. The Once-ler is the sign of consumerism where he only cares about business and money. Dreier states: "The Once-ler cares only about making more things and more money. Once-ler says 'business is business! / And business must grow'. At the end however, surveying the devastation he has caused, the Once-ler shows remorse. He says to the young boy in the end that Truffula Trees (instead of thneeds) are what everyone needs, and that new ones should be grown, given clean water and fresh air, and should be protected. The book attacks corporate greed and excessive consumerism".

Another message within the reading suggests that young children need to be taught about the environment and how to live in a sustainable way in order to preserve what we have. The children need to learn about how to live without degrading the environment, so that future generations have a clean place to live. This is shown in The Lorax by the Once-ler educating the small boy about the dangers of pollution and degradation of the environment, and by giving him the last Truffula seed so that new ones can be grown.

=== Marvin K. Mooney Will You Please Go Now! ===
Marvin K. Mooney Will You Please Go Now! was written in 1972. On the surface, the story is one of Marvin K. Mooney, a young child who needs to go to bed and is asked to "go" in many ways. The book was turned into a political statement in July 1974 by a collaboration with political humorist Art Buchwald. Dr. Seuss crossed out "Marvin K. Mooney" wherever it occurred in a copy of his story, and replaced it with "Richard M. Nixon". With Dr. Seuss's approval, Buchwald and his editors reprinted the markup as a newspaper column, and it was published July 30 in The Washington Post. President Richard Nixon resigned ten days later on August 9 as a result of the Watergate scandal.

=== The Butter Battle Book ===
The Butter Battle Book, written in 1984, was a thinly disguised allegory about the danger and implications of the Cold War, in particular the arms race. The book's premise is about a war that is fueled by the different viewpoints of how one should butter one's bread. The Yooks and Zooks constantly try to build better weaponry to scare the enemy. The book's message is that the arms race could be avoided if the trivial misunderstanding of "which side of bread is to be buttered", could just be let go, which would lead to each side not needing to increase the power of its arsenal.

=== King Looie Katz ===
King Looie Katz, which appears in I Can Lick 30 Tigers Today! and Other Stories, has a political theme of rebellion against hierarchy leading to democracy.

In a town called Katzenstein inhabited by cats, King Looie Katz orders another cat, Fooie, to carry his tail so that it does not drag on the ground. In turn, Fooie becomes conscious of his own tail dragging and makes another cat carry it. This process continues, with each cat forced to carry another's tail, until "the last, last cat", Zooie Katzen-bein realises there is no-one to carry his tail and protests. "Poor Zooie got so awfully mad / so mad he could have spit. / but he did a far, far braver thing ... / he simply yelled, 'I QUIT!'"; and slams the tail he had been carrying on the ground. Each other cat in turn slams down the tail they were carrying, thus undermining the hierarchy. It concludes with each cat carrying its own tail.

Unlike many other Dr. Seuss works, it includes the overt political message that Katzenstein is more "demo-catic" at the end. Readers may also draw lessons about equality and personal responsibility. King Looie is an apparent reference to the French Revolution, although Looie retains his crown, and his head.

== Legacy ==
In the early 21st century, some of Seuss's work for children was criticized for containing racist themes and caricatures. A 2019 study found that a great majority of his depictions of non-white characters utilized racial stereotypes, although it has been argued that these characters were simply a product of their time. On these grounds, in 2021, six of Seuss's books were pulled from publication.

== See also ==
- After school special
- Editorial cartoon
- Educational game
- Educational toy
- Edutainment
- Kami (Takalani Sesame)
- Serious game
