= America First =

American policy prioritizing U.S. interests over other nations

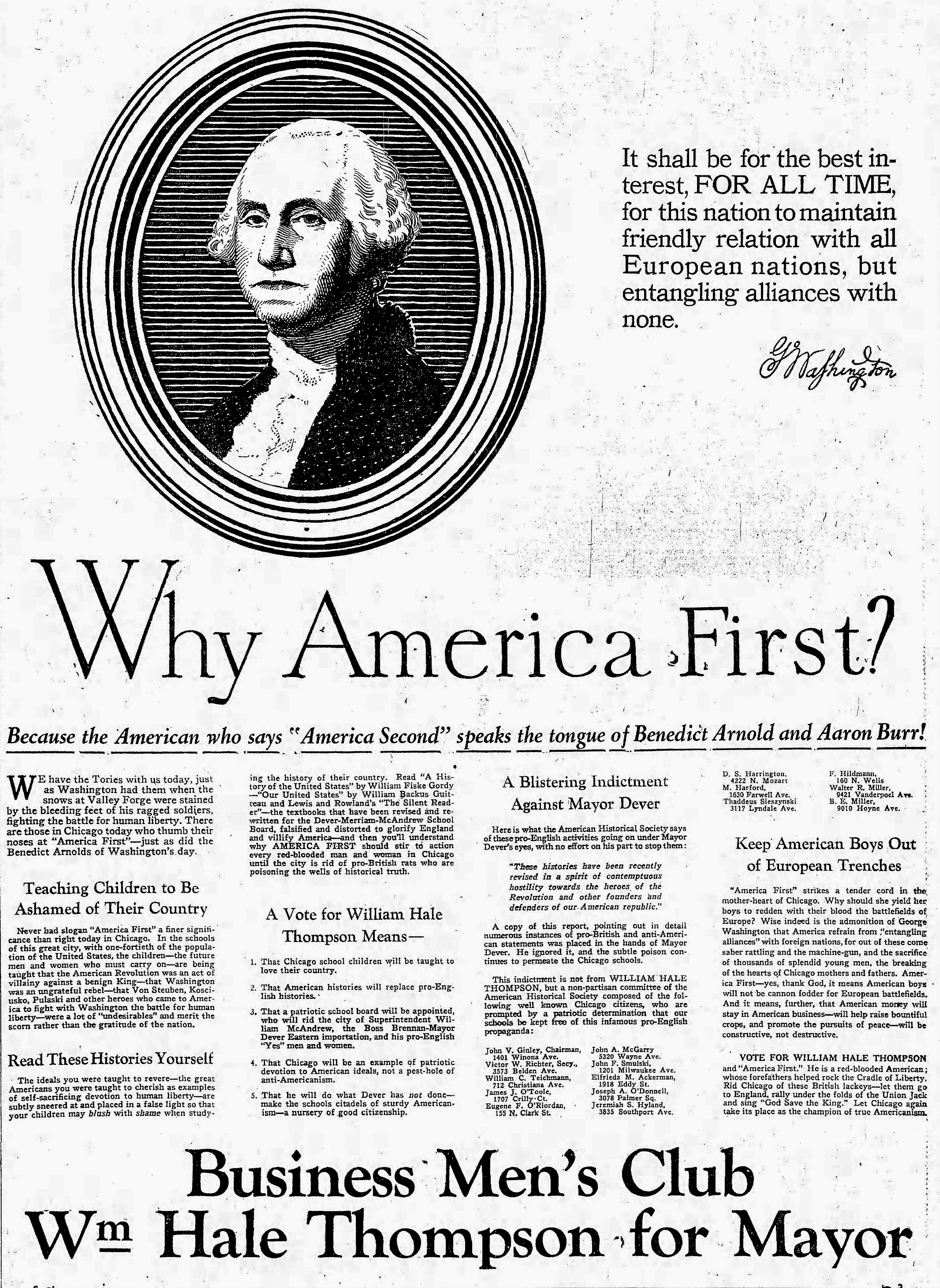
A campaign advertisement for the 1927 Chicago mayoral election supporting William Hale Thompson bearing the phrase "America First"

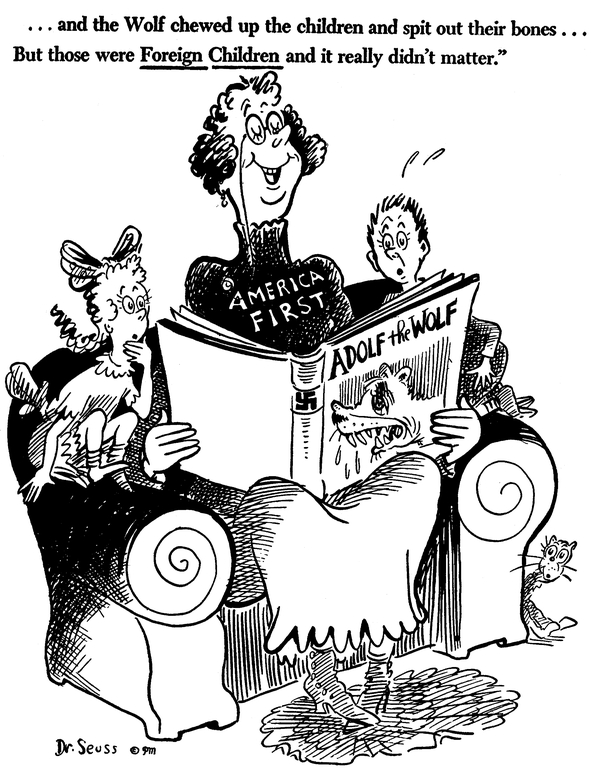
1941 political cartoon by Dr. Seuss deriding "America First" and its philosophy of non-intervention against Nazi Germany

America First denotes a set of policies in the United States that emphasize taking foreign policy and domestic policy decisions which serve the interests of the United States before the interests of all other nations and peoples. This typically manifests itself in policies of non-interventionism, American nationalism, and protectionist trade policy.

The term was promoted by President Woodrow Wilson in his 1916 presidential campaign that pledged to keep America neutral in World War I. A more non-interventionist approach gained prominence in the interwar period (1918–1939); it was advocated by the America First Committee, a non-interventionist pressure group against U.S. entry into World War II.

A century later, President Donald Trump used the slogan in his 2016 presidential campaign and presidencies (2017–2021, 2025–present), emphasizing the U.S.'s withdrawal from international treaties and organizations in the administration's foreign policy. Some media critics have derided Trump's use of the America First policy as "America Alone", or "Israel First".

== History ==
=== Origins ===
As a slogan in American political discourse, "America First" originated from the nativist American Party in the 1850s. The motto has been used by both Democratic and Republican politicians in the United States. At the outbreak of World War I, President Woodrow Wilson used the slogan to define his version of neutrality, as did newspaper publisher William Randolph Hearst. The motto was also chosen by Republican Senator Warren G. Harding during the 1920 presidential election, which he won.

The Ku Klux Klan (KKK) used the phrase at the organization's peak in the 1920s, when racist, xenophobic sentiment was widespread; it informed many of their members who ran for political office. The Immigration Act of 1924, sponsored by U.S. Representative Albert Johnson, was a legislative expression of xenophobia. It targeted Japanese, eastern and southern European immigrants by excluding them on the basis of ethnicity and national origin in an effort to preserve the country's existing ethnic demographics. Johnson's leading role in the immigration restriction bill elicited strong support from the KKK.

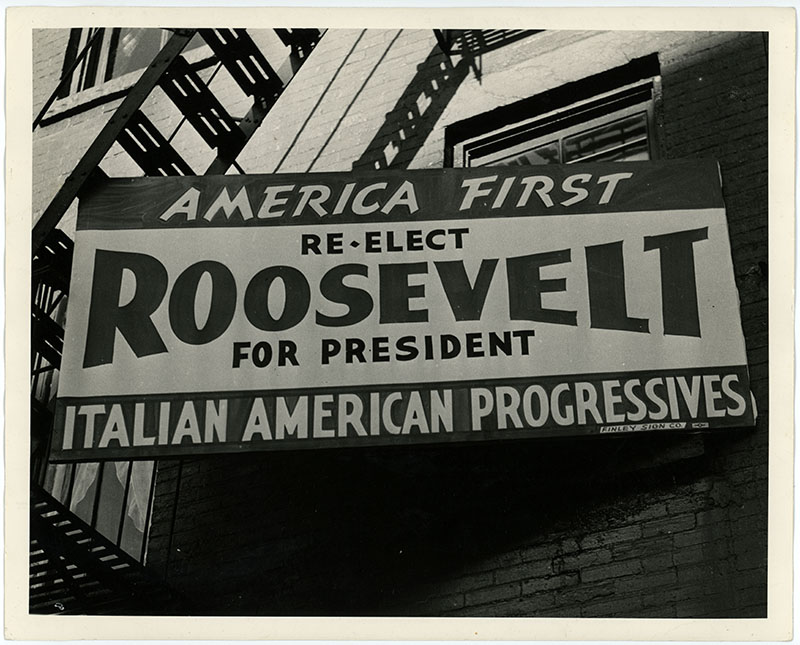
Pro-FDR isolationist billboard during the 1940 United States presidential election

America First is best known as the slogan and foreign policy advocated by the America First Committee, a non-interventionist pressure group against the American entry into World War II, which emphasized American nationalism and unilateralism in international relations. The America First Committee's membership peaked at 800,000 paying members in 450 chapters, and it popularized the slogan "America First". While the committee had a variety of supporters in the U.S., the movement was muddled with antisemitic and fascist rhetoric. Notable Americans who supported "America First" causes include Elizabeth Dilling, Gerald L. K. Smith, and Charles Lindbergh, while Dr. Seuss derided the policy in a number of political cartoons, linking it to Nazism.

In later periods, the slogan was used by Pat Buchanan, who praised the America First Committee and said "the achievements of that organization are monumental." Buchanan's "call for an America First foreign policy has been compared with the America First Committee."

=== Donald Trump ===
"President Trump's Six Months of America First", a video released by the White House in 2017

Donald Trump, who had run against Buchanan in the 2000 Reform Party presidential primaries, revived the slogan in a November 2015 op-ed in The Wall Street Journal. In its early going, the Trump campaign publicized an article by Jeff Kuhner in the World Tribune praising the candidate as a "nationalist who seeks to put America first"; campaign manager Corey Lewandowski (who later published a book with the title) promoted Trump with the phrase; and both Sarah Palin and Chris Christie featured it in their endorsements of Trump. Trump later incorporated the slogan into his daily repertoire following a suggestion by David E. Sanger during an interview with The New York Times in March 2016, borrowing it from an article that appeared earlier in the month in USA Today and written by U.S. diplomat Armand Cucciniello. In subsequent months, without referencing Buchanan's prior usage or the America First Committee, candidate Trump promised that "'America First' would be the major and overriding theme" of his administration, and advocated nationalist, anti-interventionist positions.

Following his election to the presidency, "America First" became the official foreign policy doctrine of the Trump administration. It was a theme of Trump's inaugural address, and a Politico/Morning Consult poll released on January 25, 2017, stated that 65% of Americans responded positively to President Trump's "America First" inaugural message, with 39% viewing the speech as poor.

Trump embraced American unilateralism abroad and introduced policies aimed at undermining transnational organizations such as the European Union—often deriding them on economic terms—while acting or threatening to withdraw or reduce U.S. support and participation in others, including NATO and the United Nations

Pursuing his nationalist but non-interventionist "America First" agenda, Trump withdrew (or threatened to withdraw) the United States from numerous international treaties and agreements, including the Intermediate-Range Nuclear Forces Treaty, North American Free Trade Agreement, Trans-Pacific Partnership, Paris Climate Accords, and the Iran nuclear deal.

In 2017, the administration proposed a federal budget for 2018 with both "Make America Great Again" and "America First" in its title, with the latter referencing its increases to military, homeland security, and veteran spending, cuts to spending that goes towards foreign countries, and 10-year objective of achieving a balanced budget.

The administration branded its 2017 National Security Strategy of the U.S. as "an America First National Security Strategy". The introduction to that document reads "This National Security Strategy puts America first. An America First National Security Strategy is based on American principles, a clear-eyed assessment of U.S. interests, and a determination to tackle the challenges that we face. It is a strategy of principled realism that is guided by outcomes, not ideology."

Trump's use of the slogan was criticized by some for carrying comparisons to the America First Committee; however, Trump denied being an isolationist and said:

Not isolationist, I’m not isolationist, but I am ‘America First.’ So I like the expression. I’m ‘America First.’

Scholars (such as Deborah Dash Moore), commentators (such as Bill Kristol) and Jewish organizations (including the Anti-Defamation League and Jewish Council for Public Affairs) criticized Trump's use of the slogan because of its historical association with nativism and antisemitism. Others have argued that Trump was never a non-interventionist. Columnist Daniel Larison from The American Conservative writes "Trump was quick to denounce previous wars as disasters, but his complaint about these wars was that the U.S. wasn't 'getting' anything tangible from them. He didn't see anything wrong in attacking other countries, but lamented that the U.S. didn't 'take' their resources" and that "he never called for an end to the wars that were still ongoing, but talked only about 'winning' them."

Trump's "America First" policy has been described as a major factor in the perceived increase in the international non-interventionism of the U.S. in the late 2010s, and various media critics such as The New Yorker have described the policy as "America Alone".

==== "Israel First" ====
Buchanan was an early critic of "Israel First" political policy, arguing its incompatibility with American interests. Commentators Steve Bannon and Tucker Carlson criticized Trump's support for 2025 United States strikes on Iranian nuclear sites, arguing the US should stay out of foreign conflicts. In response, Trump stated: "considering that I'm the one that developed 'America First,' and considering that the term wasn't used until I came along, I think I'm the one that decides that."

In 2025, Representative Marjorie Taylor Greene opposed unconditional support for Israel and advocated for an "America only" approach. In November, Carlson characterized right-wing support for Israel as "Israel First" on his podcast. Criticisms accelerated following the start of the 2026 Iran war. Other notable conservative and right-wing critics of "Israel First" Republicans have included James Fishback, Nick Fuentes, Charles Gambaro, Megyn Kelly, Joe Kent, Thomas Massie, Candace Owens, and Joe Rogan, as well as the magazine The American Conservative. Similarly, some liberal and left-wing outlets including Bloomberg News, Slate, and HuffPost have used the term to criticize U.S. politicians for their support for Israel.

=== Other usage ===
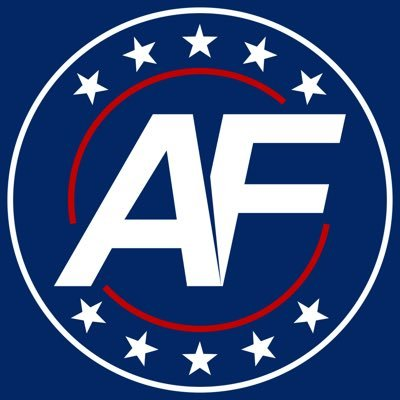
Far-right activist Nick Fuentes has made extensive use of the phrase, citing Trump and his presidency as an inspiration for his live stream.

In mid-2016, while running for a Louisiana Senate seat, David Duke, former grand wizard of the KKK, publicly claimed that he was "the first major candidate in modern times to promote the term and policy of America first" (although he was preceded by Trump).

Trump's successor as U.S. president, Joe Biden, discontinued many of Trump's COVID-19-related "America First" policies at the beginning of his presidency, but he initially kept the Trump administration's COVID-19 vaccine export ban in place. By 2021 the U.S. had started exporting vaccines out of its borders.

The U.S. House Select Committee on the January 6 Attack described far-right political activist Nick Fuentes and former Identity Evropa leader Patrick Casey as leaders of the "America First" movement in a subpoena issued in January 2022.

==== Global health strategy ====
In September 2025, the second Trump administration released a global health strategy framed around "America First". The strategy presented global health assistance as a tool of U.S. national interest, describing it as a way to make the United States safer, stronger and more prosperous. The strategy shifted U.S. global health assistance away from international programmes and disease-specific funding, and toward bilateral agreements with individual countries and direct support for national programmes.

The strategy required recipient-countries to co-invest, while aiming to promote US health products and companies abroad. The goal was to complete bilateral agreements with countries receiving the vast majority of U.S. health foreign assistance by 31 December 2025, with implementation beginning in April 2026.

The strategy focused largely on HIV, tuberculosis, malaria, polio and outbreak surveillance. Although the strategy was linked to a $4.6 billion US pledge to the Global Fund, it committed only $1 billion for local diagnostic services, treatment and related support for one year, while describing much of the remaining funding as wasteful and subject to rapid reduction.

== In popular culture ==
Following Trump's inauguration, the policy and its phrasing became a subject of international satire through the Every Second Counts video contest inspired by Dutch comedian Arjen Lubach. News satire television programs initially throughout Europe, and later from around the world, comically appealed to Trump to acknowledge their own countries in light of Trump's nationalist slogan, with a narrator mimicking Trump's voice, speech patterns, and exaggerated speaking style. Lubach's initial version, for example, ends by noting "We totally understand it's going to be America first, but can we just say: The Netherlands second?".

== Criticism and political debate ==
Several prominent U.S. officials from both political parties have criticized aspects of the "America First" approach. Former Secretaries of State Hillary Clinton and Mike Pompeo both described the Pentagon's "America First" reset as a "disaster," warning that it could put the United States at a competitive disadvantage against countries like China and Russia. Clinton also argued that focusing U.S. attention solely on the Western Hemisphere might embolden adversaries abroad, while Pompeo agreed, emphasizing that the U.S. should maintain its global influence.

This debate highlights a clear divide in U.S. politics. Supporters of the slogan argue that putting national interests first is essential to protect the country at home. Critics contend that an "America Alone" approach could isolate the United States and weaken the international partnerships and alliances that have sustained its global influence.

Analysts and policy commentators have identified several challenges associated with the doctrine. These include reduced U.S. credibility in international institutions and reduced influence in coalition diplomacy. Some observers have also noted tensions within the America First movement, as some supporters feel the administration's words do not always align with its actions on immigration, trade, and economic policies. Together, these critiques highlight a tension between prioritizing national interests alone and maintaining the cooperative frameworks essential for U.S. leadership abroad.

== See also ==
- Americentrism – Idea that US culture is most important
- American exceptionalism – Idea of the United States as unique nation
- American way – Lifestyle of people in the United States
- Make America Great Again – American political slogan
- Neo-nationalism – Type of nationalism that rose in the mid-2010s
- Political messages of Dr. Seuss
- Trump tariffs
