= Roy McKie =

American writer (1921–2015)

Roy McKie (usually spelled McKié; October 8, 1921 – January 8, 2015) was an American writer and illustrator of children's books, most notably under the Beginner Books imprint. He illustrated many books penned by Theodor Seuss Geisel (Dr. Seuss) under the pen name Theo. LeSieg ("Geisel" spelled backwards).

Books illustrated by McKie (books he wrote himself are marked with *) include:

- The Big Orange Book of Beginner Books by Dr. Seuss - 2015 (with Dr. Seuss, Scott Nash and Michael Frith) (his final work after his death)
- The Big Purple Book of Beginner Books by Helen Palmer, P.D. and Peter Eastman and Michael Frith - 2012 (with P.D. and Peter Eastman)
- Skiing by Henry Beard – 2002
- Sailing by Henry Beard – 2001 – dictionary of funny sailing terms
- Computing by Henry Beard – 1999
- The Big Green Book of Beginner Books by Dr. Seuss - 1997/2022 (with Quentin Blake, B. Tobey, George Booth, Michael J. Smollin [later Kelly Kennedy] and James Stevenson)
- A Big Ball of String by Marion Holland – 1993 (35th anniversary edition)
- A Dictionary of Silly Words About Growing Up by Henry Beard — 1988
- Golfing by Henry Beard – 1987 dictionary of funny golfing terms
- Cooking by Henry Beard – 1985 dictionary of funny cooking terms
- Noah's Ark - 1984
- Fishing by Henry Beard – 1983 dictionary of funny fishing terms
- Ship's Log by Henry Beard – 1983 dictionary of funny nautical terms
- Gardening, A Gardeners Dictionary By Henry Beard – 1982 – dictionary of funny gardening terms.
- The Tooth Book by Dr. Seuss (writing as Theo. LeSieg) – 1981 (the 2000 edition replaces McKie's illustrations with new ones by Joe Mathieu)
- The Joke Book* – 1979
- The Hair Book by Graham Tether – 1979 (in 2019, the 40th anniversary edition replaces McKie's illustrations with new ones by Andrew Joyner)
- Dog* – 1978
- The Riddle Book* – 1978
- Roy McKie's Zodiac Book* – 1977
- Would You Rather Be a Bullfrog? by Dr. Seuss (writing as Theo. LeSieg) – 1975
- The Many Mice of Mr. Brice by Dr. Seuss (writing as Theo. LeSieg) - 1973 (the 1989 edition replaces this title with new ones called The Pop-Up Mice of Mr. Brice, and later in early 2015 and early 2021, the 2015 and 2021 editions replace the pop-up book with new board books)
- In a People House by Dr. Seuss (writing as Theo. LeSieg) – 1972
- I Can Write a book by ME, Myself with a little help from Dr. Seuss (writing as Theo. LeSieg) – 1971
- The Nose Book by Al Perkins – 1970 (the 2002 edition replaces McKie's illustrations with new ones by Joe Mathieu)
- My Book About Me by ME, Myself with some little help from my friend Dr. Seuss – 1969
- The Eye Book by Dr. Seuss (writing as Theo. LeSieg) – 1968 (the 1999 edition replaces McKie's illustrations with new ones by Joe Mathieu)
- Bennett Cerf's Book of Animal Riddles by Bennett Cerf – 1964
- Summer by Alice Low – 1963 (2001 recolor edition without banned pages)
- Snow by P. D. Eastman – 1962
- More Riddles by Bennett Cerf – 1961 (the 1999 edition replaces McKie's illustrations with new ones by Debbie Palen part of Riddles and More Riddles!)
- Ten Apples Up on Top by Dr. Seuss (writing as Theo. LeSieg) – 1961 (1998 recolor Bright and Early Board Book edition [with new 2004 recolor Beginner Book pages added],) – Counting book for children
- Bennett Cerf's Book of Riddles by Bennett Cerf – 1960 (the 1999 edition replaces McKie's illustrations with new ones by Debbie Palen part of Riddles and More Riddles!)
- The Greats Family comic books by Roy McKie & Dr. Seuss – 1946 (his first work)
- Mr. Wizard's Supermarket Science by Don Herbert - 1980
