= Barbara Holland =

American writer (1933-2010)

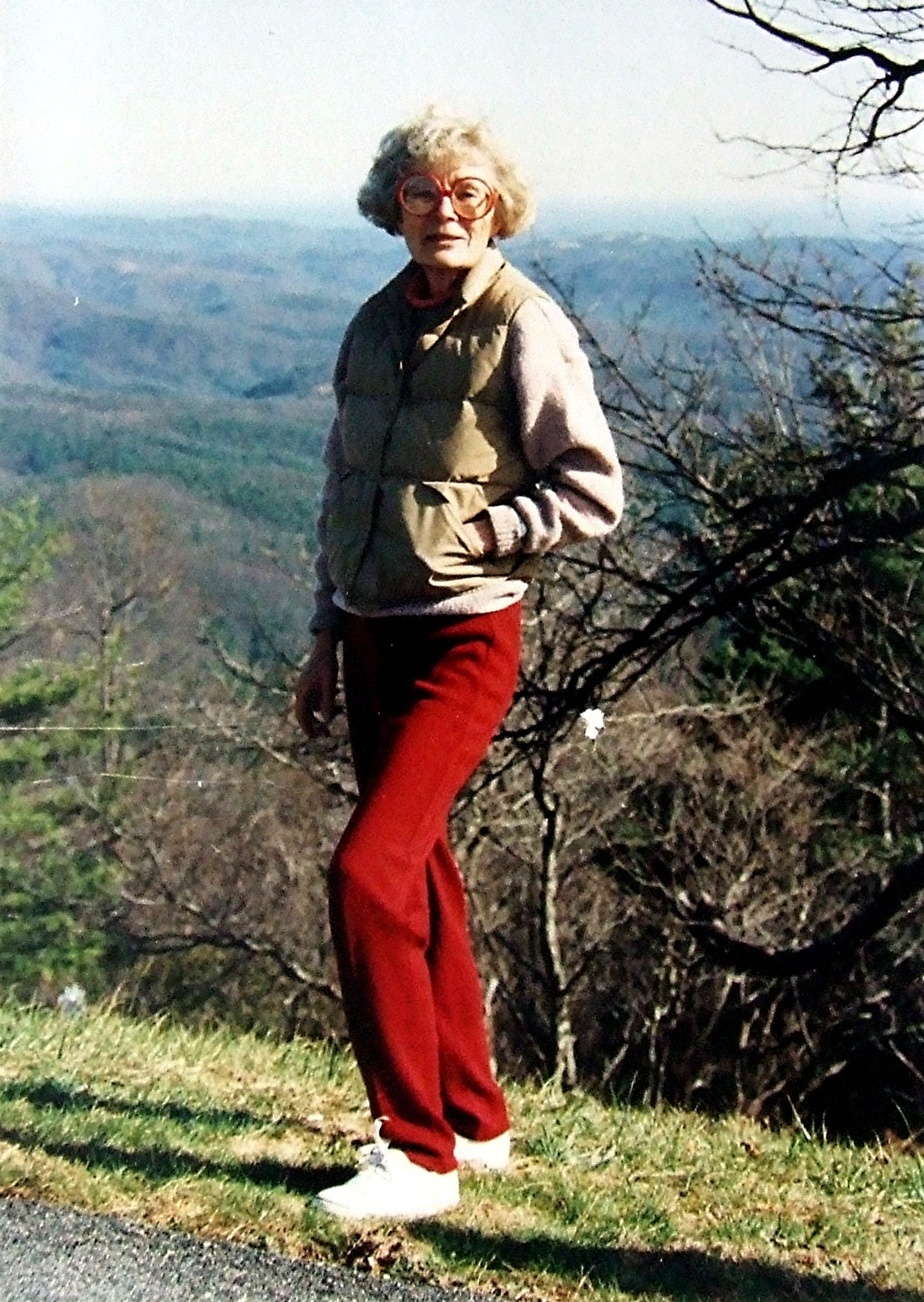
- Born: April 5, 1933
- Died: September 7, 2010 (aged 77)
- Education: American University
- Writing career
- Genres: children's literature essays memoir history
- Notable work: The Name of the Cat
- Notable awards: Athenaeum Literary Award (1988)

Barbara Murray Holland (April 5, 1933 – September 7, 2010) was an American author who wrote in defense of such modern-day vices as cursing, drinking, eating fatty food and smoking cigarettes, as well as a memoir of her time spent growing up in Chevy Chase, Maryland, near Washington, D.C.

== Early life ==
She was born on April 5, 1933, in Washington, D.C., and grew up in Chevy Chase. Her parents divorced when she was a child and her mother later married Thomas Holland, whom she strongly disliked, later writing that "My friends and I were all deathly afraid of our fathers ... Fathers were angry; it was their job." Her mother, Marion Holland, had four more children and made a career writing and illustrating children's books—including A Big Ball of String, (1958), one of the earliest Random House Beginner Books. Following in her mother's footsteps, Barbara Holland won the National Scholastic poetry competition in consecutive years while in high school, making her the first junior to win the competition and the first to win it twice when she won again the following school year.

== Career ==
Relishing the ability to support herself, Holland started working at Hecht's department store in the early 1950s. In a riposte to Virginia Woolf's 1929 essay A Room of One's Own in which Woolf stated that "A woman must have money and a room of her own if she is to write fiction," Holland wrote, "No, Mrs. Woolf." She must have "A job, Mrs. Woolf."

Holland moved to Philadelphia, where she worked as a copywriter at an advertising agency. She also began writing articles and short stories that were regularly published in magazines including Ladies’ Home Journal, McCall's, Redbook and Seventeen. Holland's first published books were for children, followed by Mother's Day in 1980, an autobiographical account of raising children while working full-time. In 1988 she published The Name of the Cat, a popular book that she updated and reissued as Secrets of the Cat: Its Lore, Legend and Lives in 1994, 2002 and 2010.

Turning to essays, Holland published three collections: Endangered Pleasures: In Defense of Naps, Bacon, Martinis, Profanity, and Other Indulgences (1995); Bingo Night at the Fire Hall: The Case for Cows, Orchards, Bake Sales & Fairs (1997), and Wasn't the Grass Greener? A Curmudgeon's Fond Memories (1999). Endangered Pleasures included some of her essays supporting habits such as drinking and smoking. Holland lamented the increasing social unacceptability of common vices, saying: "We have let the new Puritans take over, spreading a layer of foreboding across the land ... and denying ourselves even the most harmless delights marks the suitably somber outlook on life."

Historical and biographical works included Hail to the Chiefs: How to Tell Your Polks From Your Tylers (1990), which was updated in 2003 as Hail to the Chiefs: Presidential Mischief, Morals & Malarkey, from George W. to George W.; They Went Whistling: Women Wayfarers, Warriors, Runaways, and Renegades (2001), and Gentlemen's Blood: A History of Dueling From Swords at Dawn to Pistols at Dusk (2003).

Holland's 2005 memoir When All the World Was Young recounted growing up during and after World War II. In 2007 The Washington Post published a profile of Holland after the release of her 16th book, The Joy of Drinking, which she wrote to protest the rise of "broccoli, exercise and Starbucks." During the interview, she poured herself a glass of wine and lit a cigarette, pointing to each and saying, "Stuck up here on this mountain, I have only two hobbies" and said that she regularly drank a "half-gallon of Scotch a week".

== Death ==
She lived in Philadelphia for most of her life and moved to Bluemont, Virginia in 1990, to a cabin where she wrote many of her books. Holland died at age 77 on September 7, 2010, of lung cancer at her home in Bluemont. Her three marriages all ended in divorce; she had a daughter and two sons.

== Bibliography ==
- The Pony Problem. E.P. Dutton. 1979. ISBN 0-525-37345-4.; (Reprint: Puffin Books 1993)
- Prisoners at the Kitchen Table. Houghton Mifflin/Clarion Books. 1979. ISBN 0-395-28969-6.
- Mother's Day: The view from in here/In Private Life. Doubleday & Company. 1980. ISBN 1-888173-04-1.; (Reprint: Akadine Press 1997)
- Creepy-Mouse Coming to Get You. Clarion Books. 1985. ISBN 0-89919-329-3.
- Secrets of the Cat. William Morrow Paperbacks. 2010. ISBN 978-0061978043.
- Hail to the Chiefs: Presidential mischief, morals & malarky from George W. to George W./How to tell your Polks from your Tylers. Ballantine Books. 1990. ISBN 1-57962-081-7.; (Reprint: Permanent Press 2003)
- One's Company: Reflections on Living Alone. Ballantine Books. 1992. ISBN 0-345-37555-6.
- Endangered Pleasures: In defense of naps, bacon, martinis, profanity, and other indulgences. Little, Brown. 1995. ISBN 0-06-095647-X.; (Reprint: Harper Perennial 2000)
- Bingo Night at the Fire Hall: The case for cows, orchards, bake sales & fairs. Harcourt Brace & Company. 1997. ISBN 0-15-100268-1.
- Brief Heroes & Histories. A Common Reader/Akadine Press. 1998. ISBN 978-0-15-100442-3.
- Wasn't the Grass Greener? A curmudgeon's fond memories. Harcourt Brace & Company. 1999. ISBN 0-15-100442-0.
- They Went Whistling: Women Wayfarers, Warriors, Runaways, and Renegades. Pantheon Books/Random House. 2001. ISBN 0-375-42055-X.
- Gentlemen's Blood - A History of Dueling from Swords at Dawn to Pistols at Dusk. Bloomsbury. 2003. ISBN 1-58234-366-7.
- When All the World Was Young. Bloomsbury. 2005. ISBN 1-58234-525-2.
- The Joy of Drinking. Bloomsbury. 2007. ISBN 978-1-59691-337-0.
