= The Foot Book =

Book by Dr. Seuss

- Author: Dr. Seuss
- Illustrator: Dr. Seuss
- Language: English
- Genre: Children's literature
- Publication date: October 12, 1968 (Renewed in 1996)
- Publication place: United States
- Media type: Print (Hardcover and paperback)
- ISBN: 0-394-80937-8
- Preceded by: The Cat in the Hat Song Book
- Followed by: I Can Lick 30 Tigers Today! and Other Stories

The Foot Book is a children's book written by Dr. Seuss and first published in 1968. Intended for young children, it seeks to convey the concept of opposites through depictions of different kinds of feet. The text of The Foot Book is highly stylized, containing the rhymes, repetitions, and cadences typical of Dr. Seuss's work.

The Foot Book is Seuss's first in the Bright and Early Books series, intended for children too young for books in the Beginner Books series. It was also his first book after the death of his wife Helen Palmer Geisel, and Seuss put in eight-hour days working on it as a way of coping with the loss. The Foot Book was extremely successful, and in 1997, it was in its 52nd reprinting.

== Inspirations ==
Like many Dr. Seuss books, The Foot Book has inspired others. Big Brother Mouse, a publishing project in Laos, drew on The Foot Book to develop Baby Frog, Baby Monkey, a book for very young readers that uses rhymes, repetition, and the pairing of opposite words in the same style.
