= My Book =

My Book may refer to:

- My Book (album), a 2006 album by K-Ci
- Western Digital My Book, a brand of external hard drive

== See also ==
- My Book about ME, a children's book by Dr. Seuss
- My Booky Wook, a 2007 memoir by Russell Brand
