= Al Perkins (children's writer) =

American writer (1904–1975)

- Born: August 27, 1904; New York City, New York, U.S.
- Died: February 10, 1975 (aged 70); La Jolla, California, U.S.

Al Perkins (1904–1975) was the writer of several children's books, including Hand, Hand, Fingers, Thumb, The Digging-est Dog, and The Ear Book. He also wrote early titles in the Beginner Books and Bright and Early Books series.

== Bibliography ==
- Don and Donna Go to Bat (Beginner Books, 1966) — illustrated by B. Tobey - His first work.
- The Digging-est Dog (Beginner Books, 1967) — illustrated by Eric Gurney
- Hugh Lofting's Travels of Doctor Dolittle (Beginner Books, 1967) — illustrated by Philip Wende
- Meet Doctor Dolittle (Random House, 1967) - illustrated by Lean Jason
- Hugh Lofting's Doctor Dolittle and the Pirates (Beginner Books, 1968) — illustrated by Philip Wende
- Ian Fleming's Story of Chitty Chitty Bang Bang (Beginner Books, 1968) - illustrated by B. Tobey
- Meet Chitty Chitty Bang Bang, the Wonderful Magical Car! (Random House, 1968) — illustrated by John Hanna
- The Ear Book (Bright and Early Books/Bright and Early Board Books, 1968/2007) — illustrated by William O'Brian/Henry Payne
- King Midas and the Golden Touch (Beginner Books/Scholastic, 1969/1973) — illustrated by Harold Berson/Haig and Regina Shekerjian
- Hand, Hand, Fingers, Thumb (Bright and Early Books/Bright and Early Board Books/Big Bright and Early Board Books, 1969) — illustrated by Eric Gurney
- The Nose Book (Bright and Early Books/Bright and Early Board Books/Big Bright and Early Board Books, 1970/2002) — illustrated by Roy McKie/Joe Mathieu
- Tubby and the Lantern (Beginner Books, 1971) — illustrated by Rowland B. Wilson
- Tubby and the Poo-Bah (Beginner Books, 1972) — illustrated by Rowland B. Wilson - His final work before his death.
- The Big Red Book of Beginner Books (Beginner Books, 1995) - with Joan Heilbroner, Marlin Sadler, Mike McClintock, P.D. Eastman and Robert Lopshire, illustrated by Robert Lopshire, P.D. Eastman, Eric Gurney, Roger Bollen and Fritz Seibel
- My Big Book of Beginner Books about Me (Beginner Books, 2011) - with Dr. Seuss and Graham Tether, illustrated by Dr. Seuss, Joe Mathieu and Sylvie Wickstrom
- The Big Aqua Book of Beginner Books (Beginner Books, 2017) - with Dr. Seuss and Robert Lopshire, illustrated by Eric Gurney, Dr. Seuss, Art Cummings and Robert Lopshire - His final work after his death in 1975.
