= A Fish Out of Water (book) =

Book by Helen Palmer Geisel

- Front cover
- Author: Based on Gustav, the Goldfish from Redbook made by: Dr. Seuss (uncredited); Adapted by: Helen Palmer Geisel
- Illustrator: Based on Gustav, the Goldfish from Redbook made by: Dr. Seuss (uncredited); Illustrated by: P. D. Eastman
- Language: English
- Genre: Children's literature
- Publisher: Beginner Books/Random House
- Publication date: June 29, 1961
- Publication place: United States
- Media type: Print (hardcover and paperback)
- ISBN: 0-394-80023-0
- OCLC: 417086758

A Fish Out of Water is a 1961 American children's book written by Helen Palmer Geisel (credited as Helen Palmer) and illustrated by P. D. Eastman. The book is based on a short story by Palmer's husband Theodor Geisel (Dr. Seuss), "Gustav, the Goldfish", which was published with his own illustrations in Redbook magazine in June 1950.

== Plot ==
The story is about a boy who buys a fish from a pet store. The boy names the fish Otto. Mr. Carp, the owner, gives the boy instructions on how to care for the fish, including strict feeding instructions: "Never feed him a lot. Just so much, and no more! Never more than a spot! Or something may happen. You never know what". When the boy disobeys these instructions out of compassion for his new pet, Otto begins to grow uncontrollably, quickly outgrowing his fishbowl. This leads the boy to move him into a series of successively larger containers, ending with the bathtub. When Otto outgrows the tub, the house begins to flood.

The boy then requests help from a police officer and the fire department, who help him take Otto down to the local pool. When the firefighters drop Otto into the pool, he expands to the size of the pool and scares off all of the swimmers. Since Otto keeps on growing, the boy calls Mr. Carp who is not surprised, as boys always ignore his feeding instructions. When Mr. Carp arrives, he dives into the pool and pulls Otto below. Eventually, he emerges with the fish, back to its normal size. He refuses to say how he did it, but tells the boy to never overfeed Otto again, and the boy now knows what happens and takes his advice to heart.

== Background ==
"Gustav, the Goldfish", the short story that served as the basis for this book, was written and illustrated by Dr. Seuss and published in the June 1950 edition of Redbook magazine as the first installment in his series of children's stories for Redbook. This story has much in common with A Fish Out of Water, including its plot and characters, but the goldfish's name is Gustav instead of Otto, and the pet shop owner's name is Mr. VanBuss instead of Mr. Carp. The original story was collected, along with six other Dr. Seuss stories originally published in magazines, in the 2011 collection The Bippolo Seed and Other Lost Stories.

In 1959, in a letter to his wife, he gave her formal permission to write a book for the Beginner Books series based on his original story, writing: "You have the right to use any of the situations or any of the words from the original story that your little heart desires. You must, however, comply with all necessary steps in protecting my original copyright". Palmer's work involved, in part, rewriting and simplifying the original text to comply with Beginner Books' policies. She finished A Fish Out of Water in 1961, at the Hotel Madison in New York City where she and her husband were staying for six weeks while their home in La Jolla, California, was being remodeled. She had apparently been working on the book continuously, as she jokingly described this last revision as "the 9,373th version" of the book.
