= My Book about ME =

Book by Dr. Seuss

- Hardcover cover
- Author: Dr. Seuss
- Illustrator: Roy McKie
- Language: English
- Genre: Children's literature
- Publisher: Random House
- Publication date: September 12, 1969
- Publication place: United States
- Media type: Print (hardcover)
- Pages: 72
- ISBN: 978-0394800936
- Preceded by: I Can Lick 30 Tigers Today! and Other Stories
- Followed by: I Can Draw It Myself

My Book about ME is a children's book written by Theodor Geisel under the pen name Dr. Seuss and illustrated by Roy McKie. It was first published by Random House on September 12, 1969.

The book does not have a particular plot. It is designed with numerous blank spaces intended to be filled in by the reader (mostly written, with a few illustrations) with various pieces of information specific to themselves; hence the title, My Book About Me, and the author being listed as "Me, Myself" listing "some help" from Seuss and McKie. The completed book ends up containing a sort of "profile" of the reader. The book is similar to Oh, the Places I'll Go!, a book published under the Seuss name that was inspired by Oh, the Places You'll Go!.
