= Harold Berson =

American illustrator

- Born: November 23, 1926; New York, New York, United States
- Died: February, 1986 (aged 59); New York, New York, United States
- Education: B.A. Sociology, University of California, Los Angeles (UCLA), 1953
- Occupations: Writer, illustrator
- Spouse: Paula Berson (née Winter)
- Writing career
- Language: English
- Years active: 1956 - 1983
- Genre: Folk tales
- Subjects: North Africa, Middle East, Europe

Harold Berson (23 November 1926 – February 1986) was an American illustrator and author, primarily of children's books.

== Early life and education ==
Berson was born in New York City, grew up in Los Angeles and graduated from the University of California, Los Angeles. He studied art in Paris.

== Career ==
Berson travelled extensively in Turkey, North Africa and Europe with his wife, artist Paula Winter Berson. He began illustrating books in the late 1950s, mainly working in brush and ink and watercolor. His works include a number of self-illustrated retellings of traditional folk tales of those regions.

In a 1973 profile in the magazine Something About the Author, Berson said, "I love illustrating. I usually work in pen or brush and ink, mainly the latter. I use watercolor for the color, usually preseparated." Berson collaborated with many authors, including Barbara K. Walker, one-time curator of the Uysal–Walker Archive of Turkish Oral Narrative at Texas Tech University, illustrating a number of her works, including:

- Watermelons, Walnuts, and the Wisdom of Allah, and Other Tales of the Hoca (1967)
- Pigs and Pirates: a Greek Tale (1969)
- New Patches for Old (1975)

== Selected bibliography ==
- Humpty Dumpty's Magazine (Illustrator, many issues, beginning ca. 1956)
- Loretta Mason Potts (Illustrator, with Mary Chase, author, 1958)
- The Nutcracker (Illustrator, with Daniel Walden, author, 1959)
- Mince Pie and Mistletoe (Illustrator, with Phyllis McGinley, author, 1959)
- A Pint of Judgment; A Christmas Story (Illustrator, with Elizabeth Morrow, author, 1960)
- Racketty-Packetty House : And Other Stories (Illustrator, with Frances Hodgson Burnett, author, 1961)
- Raminagrobis and the Mice (1965)
- Pop Goes the Turnip (1966)
- The Wild Beast (Illustrator, with N. S. Leskov, author, 1968)
- Hubba-Hubba : A Tale of the Sahara (Illustrator, with Ruth Philpott Collins, author, 1968)
- Why the Jackal Won't Speak to the Hedgehog; a Tunisian Folk Tale (1969)
- King Midas and the Golden Touch (Illustrator, with Al Perkins, author, 1969)
- The Brave Adventures of Lapitch (Illustrator, with Ivana Brlić-Mažuranić, author, 1972)
- The Thief Who Hugged a Moonbeam (1972)
- How the Devil Gets His Due (1972)
- Balarin's Goat (1972)
- The Good Guys and the Bad Guys (Illustrator, with Osmond Molarsky, author, 1973)
- Henry Possum (1973)
- More Poetry for the Holidays (Illustrator, with Nancy Larrick, author, 1973)
- Larbi and Leila; a Tale of Two Mice (1974)
- The Boy, the Baker, the Miller, and More (1974)
- A Moose Is Not a Mouse (1975)
- I'm Bored, Ma! (1976)
- The Rats Who Lived in the Delicatessen (1976)
- Abu Ali : Three Tales of the Middle East (Illustrator, with Dorothy Van Woerkom, author, 1976)
- Kassim's Shoes (1977)
- The Friends of Abu Ali : Three More Tales of the Middle East (Illustrator, with Dorothy Van Woerkom, author, 1978)
- Joseph and the Snake (1979)
- Charles and Claudine (1980)
- The Greedy Shopkeeper (Illustrator, with Irene Mirković, author, 1980)
- Truffles For Lunch (1980)
- Barrels to the Moon (1982)
- The Turkey Girl (Illustrator, with Betty Baker, author, 1983)
