= Come over to My House =

1966 children's book by Dr. Seuss

- Author: Dr. Seuss
- Illustrator: Richard Erdoes (original); Katie Kath (50th anniversary edition)
- Language: English
- Genre: Children's literature
- Publisher: Random House
- Publication date: November 12, 1966 (renewed in 1994)
- Publication place: United States
- Media type: Print (hardcover)
- OCLC: 1132492
- Preceded by: I Wish That I Had Duck Feet
- Followed by: The Eye Book

Come over to My House is a 1966 children's book written by Dr. Seuss and illustrated by Richard Erdoes. The name "Theo. LeSieg" was a pen name of Theodor Geisel, who is more commonly known by another pen name, Dr. Seuss.

The illustrations portray the various styles of homes that kids from around the world live in along with Seuss's recognizable verse. Throughout the book they also cover what kids eat, how they sleep (Japanese wooden pillows), play (sledding on pine needles), and even clean-up afterwards (Polynesian hot spring).

The book was the 44th in the Beginner Books series, in between B-43: You Will Live Under the Sea (1966) by F. & M. Phleger and B-45: Babar Loses His Crown (1967), by Laurent de Brunhoff.

== Reception ==
In 2017, Maria Botelho of the Daily Hampshire Gazette criticized the book's images, despite the fact that Dr. Seuss did not illustrate it. Botelho wrote, "in [the book], the white male protagonist travels from one stereotype about people’s dress and housing to another across the globe".
