= Sasha Alyson =

American writer and businessman

- Born: May 22, 1952 (age 74)
- Occupations: Writer, businessman
- Writing career
- Pen name: Johnny Valentine
- Language: English, Lao

Sasha Alyson (born May 22, 1952) is an American writer and businessman who started Alyson Publications in 1979. He later founded the Boston gay and lesbian newspaper Bay Windows (1983), the travel company Alyson Adventures (1995) and Big Brother Mouse, a literacy project in Laos.

== Childhood ==
Alyson grew up in Berea, Ohio. He recalls being discouraged from reading because the books were dull. "I wasn't making much progress until my parents got me a copy of The Cat in the Hat. That caught my imagination, and I soon became an avid reader." His earliest publishing experience came at the age of 16, when he and friends produced an underground newspaper at their high school, taking up issues of the Vietnam War, racism, and students' rights.

== Publishing ==
Alyson Publications was based in Boston, Massachusetts, where Alyson lived at the time. At first, the company published books on a variety of subjects. One early book, Health Care for the People: Studies from Vietnam, reflected Alyson's ongoing interest in Asia. Soon it became clear that as a small press, it would be better to specialize. The company concentrated on subjects important to gay men and lesbians, particularly subjects that were under-represented in gay literature, including gay youth, black gay men, and older gay people. A number of anthologies focused on issues of concern within certain segments of the lesbian and gay community, such as deaf people, bisexuals, and teachers.

=== Activism ===
In 1988, Alyson initiated publication of the book You Can Do Something About AIDS, in which members of the publishing industry cooperated to produce a 126-page book that was distributed free through bookstores. Other publishers and writers contributed articles and funding, and Elizabeth Taylor wrote the book's introduction. A first printing of 150,000 copies was gone in 10 days, and the book went through additional printings, finally reaching 1.5 million copies in print. As a result of this work, Alyson received the first Lambda Literary award for Publisher's Service.

In 1990, Alyson created the imprint "Alyson Wonderland" to publish children's books that depicted families with lesbian and gay parents. Under the penname Johnny Valentine, Alyson wrote five of these children's books including The Duke Who Outlawed Jelly Beans (1991) which won a Lambda Literary Award and was named an outstanding children's book of the season by Robert Hale in Horn Book Magazine. Books from the new imprint were frequently challenged in libraries, and were the subject of a major controversy in New York City when some of the titles were included on a reading list for the "Children of the Rainbow" curriculum. One title, Daddy's Roommate, faced more challenges from library patrons than any other book in the country in 1993 and 1994, according to the American Library Association. Alyson replied to the critics with an editorial in the New York Times, in which he wrote that "The parents who protest the Rainbow curriculum grew up at a time when gay people were invisible. But their children will live in a different world."

By 1992, Alyson Publications had become the largest independent publisher of gay and lesbian books, with sales of almost one million dollars a year. Alyson and his company were named "Publisher of the Year" by the New England Booksellers Association in 1994 and received the "Small Business of the Year Award" from the Greater Boston Business Council in the same year.

In 1995, Alyson sold the business to Liberation Publications, publisher of the gay magazine, The Advocate. The new owner moved the offices to California (and later to New York) and renamed it "Alyson Books".

Alyson also founded Bay Windows, a weekly gay newspaper in Boston, in 1983. It is still published, under different ownership.

== Travel Industry ==
After selling the publishing business, Alyson started the company Alyson Adventures, which offered outdoor and adventure travel for gay people. He owned and operated that company from 1995 to 2002, then sold it to Phil Sheldon of Key West, Florida, to be operated in conjunction with Hanns Ebensten Travel. In 2012 the two companies merged under the new name HE Travel.

The travel business took Alyson to southeast Asia for the first time. He moved there in 2003. He founded, and currently serves as full-time volunteer adviser for, Big Brother Mouse, a publishing and literacy project in Laos. There, he works with young Laotians to create new books, in Lao, that will inspire children to read. Some of these books are traditional Laotian fairy tales; others are original works. Several take inspiration from Dr. Seuss. Alyson has written some of the books, ranging from children's stories to non-fiction for older readers; several of his books have been translated and published in Cambodia and East Timor.

Big Brother Mouse distributes the books to rural villages, traveling by road, by river, and sometimes by elephant to reach remote locations, often giving children the first and only book they have ever owned.
