= Big Brother Mouse =

Coordinates: 19.895°N 102.141°E

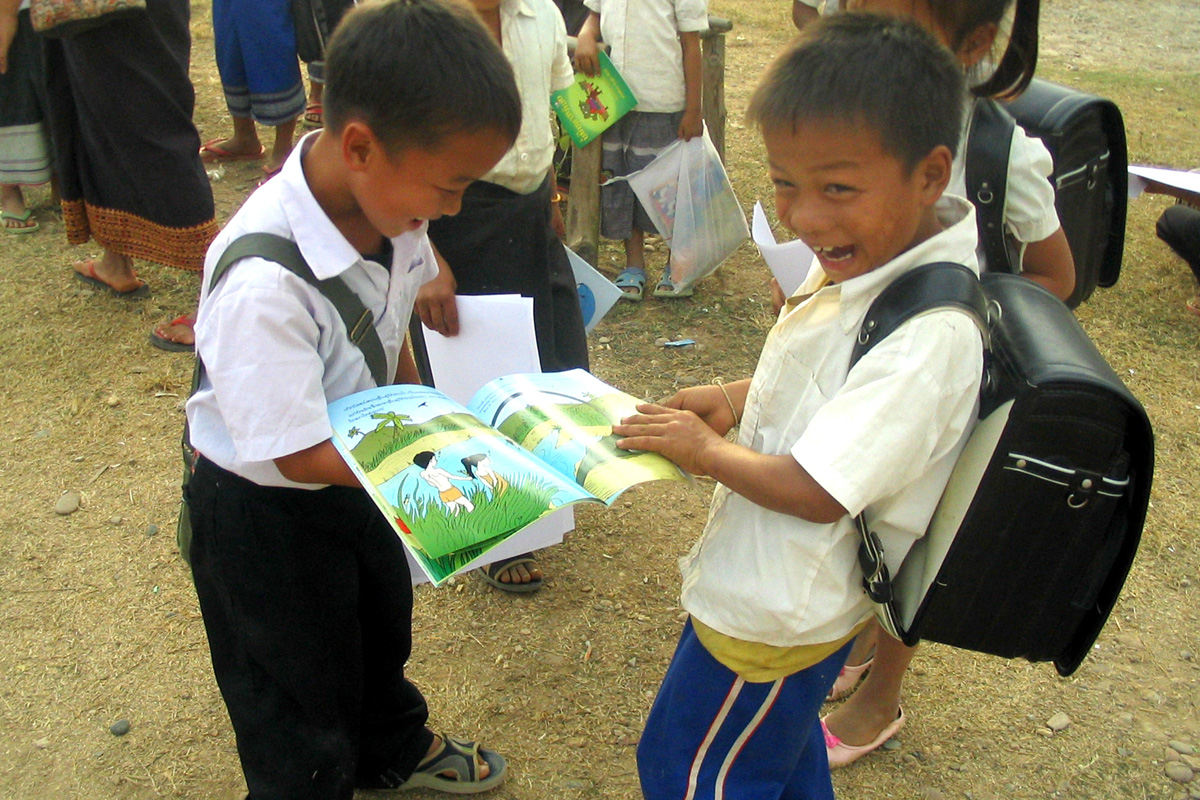
Big Brother Mouse improves literacy by producing books that are fun for children to read.

Big Brother Mouse (Lao: ອ້າຍໜູນ້ອຍ / ອ້າຽໜູນ້ອຽ, romanized: ʼāi nū nǭi) is a not-for-profit publishing project in Laos.

Big Brother Mouse publishes books that improve literacy and quality of life; and on making those books accessible, particularly in rural Lao villages. Books are scarce in Laos. Many people have never read anything except old textbooks and government pamphlets.

The project uses the slogan, "Books that make literacy fun!" Its first books, published in 2006, were easy picture books designed to have a strong appeal for children. Since then, it has expanded to publish books for all ages, "designed not only to make reading fun, but also to share information about the wider world." A growing number of titles focus on health, nutrition, history, and science.

== History ==
The founder, retired book publisher Sasha Alyson, first visited Laos in May, 2003, and discovered that many children in Lao villages had never seen a book. In fact, he himself “never saw a book in Laos. That gave me the idea for a publishing project here, that would both teach publishing skills and create books.” He began exploring the feasibility of such an idea.

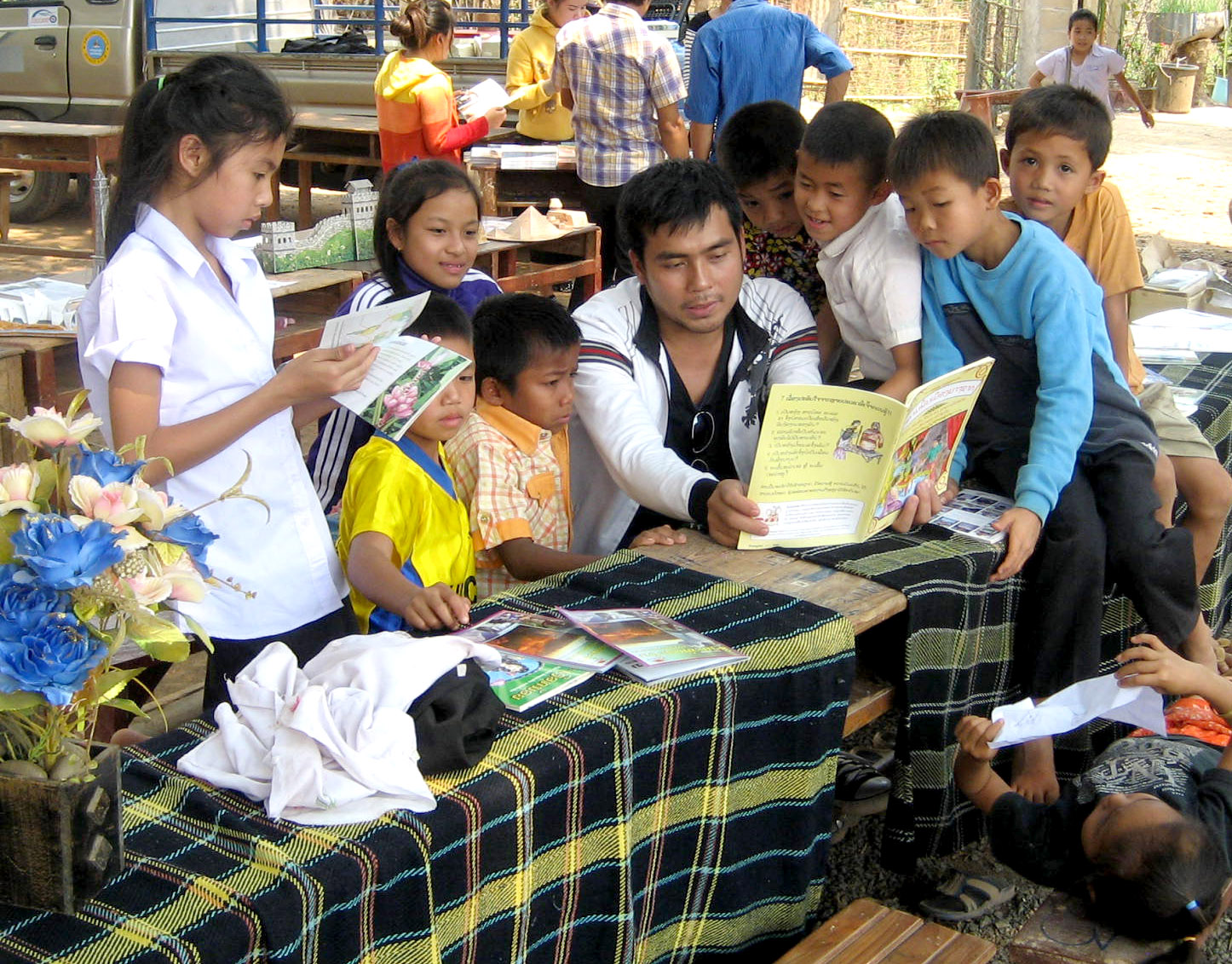
Khamla Panyasouk of Big Brother Mouse reads to children

For three years, Alyson regularly visited Laos from a temporary base in Thailand, exploring the feasibility of the project. He met with governmental officials, non-governmental organizations (NGOs), teachers, and students. During that period, Alyson also worked with two Lao college students: Khamla Panyasouk and Siphone Vouthisakdee. Together they developed five easy and entertaining books for children, often using popular books from the west for inspiration about how to make books appealing. These first five books were:

- Frog, Alligator, Buffalo by Khamla Panyasouk. This was an alphabet book, with a short humorous rhyme for each consonant in the Lao alphabet. (In the Lao alphabet, vowels are not considered part of the regular alphabet.)
- The Cat that Meditated by Siphone Vouthisakdee. Siphone wrote four traditional folktales he had learned from his parents and grandparents. The title story tells about a cat that vows to stop eating meat, so the mice begin to bring it vegetables. But one by one, the mice disappear.
- Bangkok Bob by Sasha Alyson. Inspired by the Curious George books, this tells about a young monkey who visits Bangkok and is overwhelmed by the skyscrapers and big trucks, which he thinks are tall trees and galloping elephants.
- Baby Frog, Baby Monkey by Siphone Vouthisakdee. Taking inspiration from The Foot Book, by Dr. Seuss, the author used rhymes, repetition, and the pairing of opposite words, to create a book for very young readers.
- The Polar Bear Visits Laos (Lao: ໝີຂາວທ່ຽວລາວ, romanized: mī khāo thiāu lāo) by Sasha Alyson. Inspired by another Dr. Seuss book, Hop on Pop, this matches short sentences that include an internal rhyme with cartoon images.

Three of the books were illustrated by Ounla Santi, a Vientiane art student who has continued to illustrate many books for the project. Two others were illustrated by Tha Tao and Taeng Thaotueheu, high school students who placed first and second in an art contest that Alyson sponsored in an effort to find promising young illustrators.

Publishers in Laos are required to have a special publishing license, and each book must be registered with and approved by the government. At the end of 2005, Alyson entered into an agreement with Dokked, a Vientiane-based publisher, to act as publisher for these first five books. They came off the press in March 2006, under the Dokked imprint, but also carrying the Big Brother Mouse logo. The following month a sixth book, The Big Chicken, was published in a similar cooperative arrangement with Action with Lao Children, a Vientiane-based NGO.

Soon after that, Sasha agreed with Khamla Panyasouk, author of one of the first books, that they would form a new entity to act as publisher for future books, with Khamla as the owner, and Alyson as the volunteer adviser. In June 2006, Khamla graduated from college, obtained his business license, and then received a publishing license. It was, according to officials, the first publishing license they had ever awarded in Luang Prabang Province, and required extra research for them to learn to how to do it. (It is Lao custom to identify people only by first names, even in formal situations. This article uses that first-name convention for people living in Laos, and last names for people living where that usage is customary.)

== First book parties ==
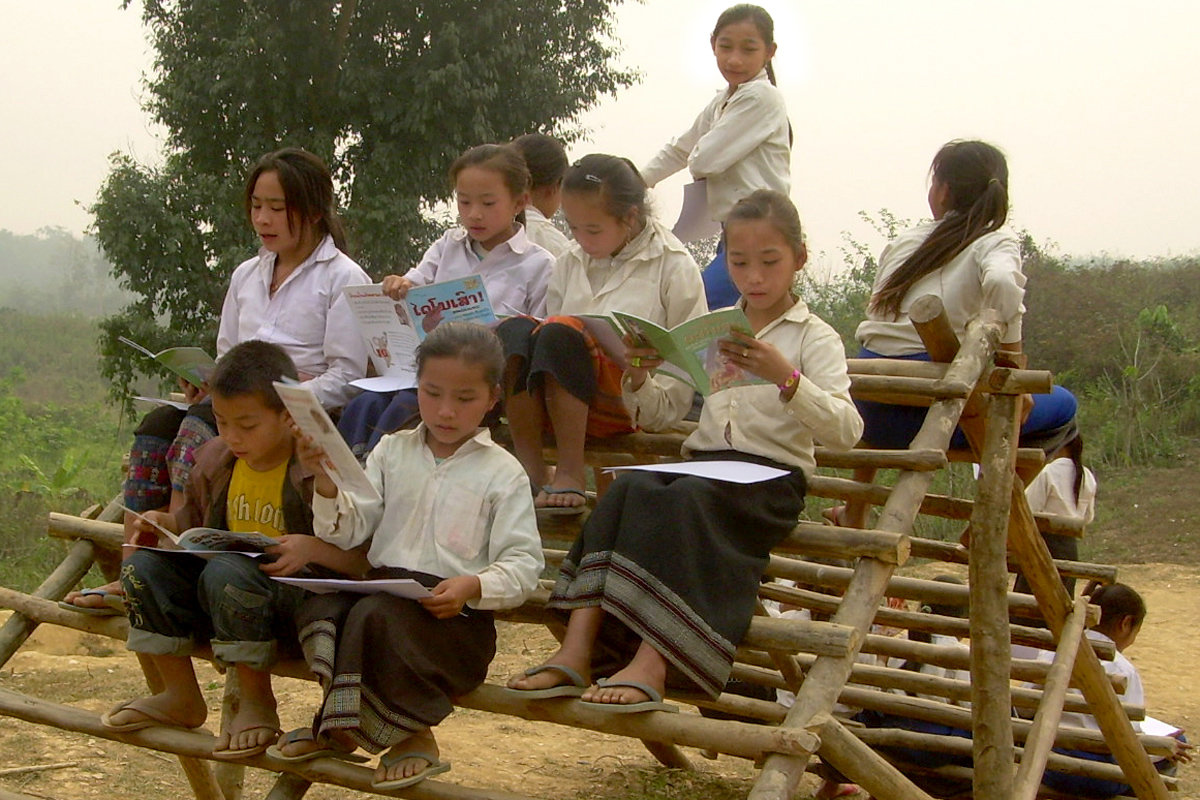
Lao students reading their first books at a school book party

Although many organizations had expressed interest in purchasing children's books if they were available, few actually did so. Big Brother Mouse began exploring other ways to get books into distribution. On 29 December 2006, they went to a school in Ban Nunsawat, a rural village on the outskirts of Luang Prabang. Khamla discussed the importance of books, Siphone talked about writing books, and Tha Tao gave an art lesson. This developed into the rural school book parties that later became the primary distribution mechanism for Big Brother Mouse books.

In its first year, Big Brother Mouse published 30 books, and has continued at approximately that rate. It continues to run book parties in rural schools, and that program has expanded considerably, with 31 of these events in 2007, 196 in 2008, increasing to 510 in 2010.

== Village reading rooms ==
In 2008, Big Brother Mouse began experimenting with another way to create book access in rural villages, by setting up small reading rooms in the home of a volunteer. This is still conducted on a smaller scale than the school book parties. At the end of 2010, there were 146 of these reading rooms, largely in the Ngoi District of Luang Prabang Province, sponsored by the Planet Wheeler Foundation (founded by Lonely Planet publishers Tony and Maureen Wheeler) and the Global Development Group of Australia.

The project aims to continue making books available, through village reading rooms such as these in other regions of Laos. This commitment was one of three that was highlighted at the plenary session of the Clinton Global Initiative, held in Hong Kong in 2008.

Tourists also help with distribution. "Give books, not candy", Khamla encourages visitors who want to take a gift when they go to a rural village.

== The name ==
The Lao name for the project is Aai Nuu Noi which literally translates as 'Older brother that is a small rodent'. (Lao uses a single term, nuu, for mice, rats, and other rodents, then distinguishes between types by using adjectives such as small, big, wild, etc.) In deciding on an English translation, Alyson originally considered "Brother Mouse" to avoid any confusion with the Big Brother of George Orwell, but finally decided "Big Brother Mouse" was a catchier name, and that most people would understand it was not related to the Orwellian connotations.

== People ==
- Sasha Alyson (b. 1952), the founder, continues to act as full-time volunteer adviser to the project.

All of the paid staff are Lao, and three of them are owners:

- Khamla Panyasouk (b. 1983) the original owner, was born in a rural village in Pak Ou District. As the primary owner, he oversees all activities, and handles most government relations. At about age 12, he moved to Luang Prabang and became a novice monk at a Buddhist temple, so that he could continue his education beyond the primary school that was available in his village. He recalls his surprise, in Luang Prabang, when he saw tourists reading books. He was only aware of books as the dull, obsolete textbooks he sometimes had seen in his school, and couldn't imagine why anyone would read them while on vacation.
- Siphone Vouthisakdee (b. 1984) Siphone was born in a remote village, where only five children have graduated from primary school. He and Khamla had known each other for many years, first when they were both novice monks, then as students at the Teacher Training College. Siphone has put to paper several collections of Lao folktales, including a collection of stories about Xieng Mieng, the most popular Lao folkhero. He handles a growing range of editorial responsibilities.
- Sonesoulilat (Sone) Vongsouline (b. 1990) who received eight years of training at the Children's Cultural Center in Luang Prabang, where he learned to lead children's activities. Sone joined the Big Brother Mouse staff during its first year, when he was 16. His responsibilities quickly increased, and he became a part owner three years later, taking responsibility for hiring, training, and coordinating events in schools and villages.

== Books ==
As of the end of 2010, about two-thirds of the books published by Big Brother Mouse were intended for children up to age 12, although they are also enjoyed by adults, who have not seen such books before. The following sample list of titles shows the range of books the project has produced:

- Animals of Laos: A well-illustrated introduction to the country's varied animals, which encourages readers to protect Laos's natural heritage, while introducing simple scientific and environmental ideas.
- Around the World with 23 Children: Students from the Vientiane International School wrote about their home countries from their perspective, talking about such topics as popular foods, holidays, customs, landmarks, and animals.
- Baby Care: Why is breastfeeding important? What situations call for a visit to the doctor? Why do babies cry? With just one or two sentences per page, this book guides new parents through the first year of their child's life. It was the first book published by Big Brother Mouse that specifically targeted adults rather than children, and sought to directly improve quality of life. The high level of interest that it generated, in rural villages, convinced the staff to continue publishing more such books.
- The Dead Tiger Who Killed a Princess: Folktales were once passed along orally, but they risk being forgotten, as television spreads. This collection is the first in a series, which the project plans to continue indefinitely, to preserve them. Already enough stories have been collected for three more volumes.
- The Diary of a Young Girl: Anne Frank's famous and eloquent diary took four years to translate and get into print; it appeared at the end of 2010.
- The Hungry Frog: An 8-page book, by a Khamla, young woman on the project staff who had no writing experience, has colorful illustrations, strong repetition, and a punchy ending; it's intended to draw the interest of very beginning readers.
- The Joy of Reading: A small book, inspired by the Mem Fox classic Reading Magic, encourages parents to read aloud to their children, and gives some pointers about how to do so.
- Laos 1957: Anthropologist Joel Halpern came to Laos for a year, in 1957, and preserved some 3,000 color slides, with detailed captions. They provided the basis for a book which, for most Lao readers, is their first chance to see the world of their parents and grandparents.
- The Little Mermaid: Hans Christian Andersen’s romantic classic has been popular particularly with teenagers and young adults.
- New, Improved Buffalo: This story of a boy who improves his buffalo, by adding an umbrella, then a television, wings, extra legs, and more, was illustrated by Chittakone, a 14-year-old boy who won the second art contest sponsored by Big Brother Mouse.
- Proverbs of Laos: Young people at the Children's Cultural Center and at the Orphanage School in Luang Prabang interviewed parents and grandparents to select a favorite proverb, then illustrated it.
- Spectacular!: Eye-catching photographs, obtained through Wikimedia Foundation and Creative Commons licensing, show microbes, galaxies, and everything in between.
- Traditional Toys: Photos and text show how Lao villages have, for generations, made and enjoyed toys from natural objects.
- Wat Xieng Thong, the stories of Siaosawat: The Buddhist Wat Xieng Thong temple, the most famous temple in Luang Prabang has a chapel decorated with mirrored mosaics, that tell parables of a past age.
- What's in the Sky?: The spectacular photographs provided in recent years by NASA were the backdrop for one of the project's first science books.
- Women's Health: Four chapters about women's anatomy, pregnancy, and childbirth, from the Hesperian Foundation's book Where Women Have No Doctor.

== Organizational structure and affiliations ==
Lao law does not have a provision for non-profit organizations of the type that exist in many Western countries. Big Brother Mouse operates under a standard Lao business license, but on a not-for-profit basis. In 2010 it reported total income of US$326,000, from these sources:

- 26% from foundations (Australia, USA, and Europe)
- 27% from large individual donors (US$10,000 or more)
- 29% from individual donors (less than US$10,000 U.S.)
- 18% from sales of books

Most US donors contribute through the Laos Literacy Project, Inc., a 501-c-3 non-profit organization in the United States that was established specifically to support Big Brother Mouse's literacy and education work.

Significant support also comes from Planet Wheeler Foundation and the Global Development Group (GDG) in Australia, and most Australian donors contribute through the GDG to receive an Australian tax deduction.
