= Nancy Larrick =

American author, editor, and educator (1910–2004)

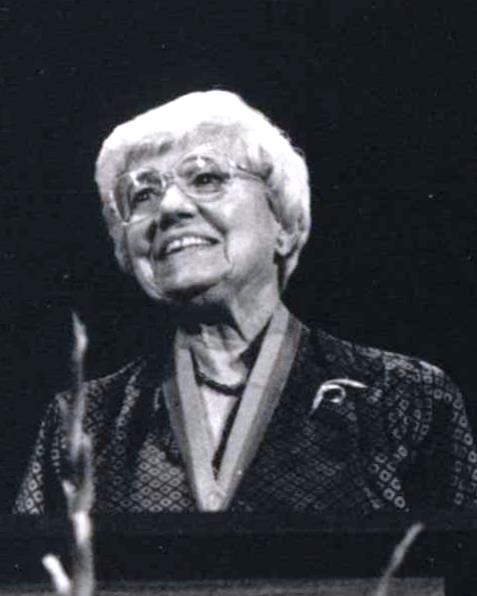
- Larrick, circa 1987
- Born: December 28, 1910; Winchester, Virginia
- Died: November 14, 2004 (aged 93); Winchester, Virginia
- Occupations: Author, editor, educator
- Known for: Children's literature anthologies, reading advocacy
- Notable work: A Parent's Guide to Children's Reading (1958), "The All-White World of Children's Books" (1965)

Nancy Larrick (December 28, 1910 – November 14, 2004), also known as Nancy Larrick Crosby, was an American author, editor, and educator who served as the first woman president of the International Reading Association. Larrick was a recognized authority on children's literature, best known for A Parent's Guide to Children's Reading (1958), for her 1965 article highlighting the lack of diverse representation in children's books, and for her numerous literature anthologies for children.

== Life ==
Larrick was born and raised in Winchester, Virginia, the only child of Herbert Scaggs Larrick, an attorney, and Nancy Clarke Nulton Larrick, a former Latin teacher. She attended Handley High School and received her undergraduate degree from Goucher College in 1930. Upon her graduation, with few job opportunities available during the Great Depression, Larrick returned to Winchester and taught English in public schools for twelve years. While working as a teacher, she earned a master's degree from Columbia University in 1937.

During World War II, from 1942 to 1945, Larrick served as education director for the War Bond Division of the United States Department of the Treasury. There she promoted the sale of war bonds through outreach to schools and contributed a musical pageant to War Bond Plays and Other Dramatic Material for Use in Connection with War Finance Promotion (1943).

After the war, Larrick moved to New York to begin working in the publishing industry, editing magazines and journals about reading and education. She worked as education director in the children's book department at Random House throughout the 1950s and earned a doctorate in education from New York University in 1955.

On February 15, 1958, Larrick married writer Alexander Lawrence Crosby at her parents' home in Winchester, Virginia. The couple lived together first in New York's Greenwich Village, then on a 33-acre farm in Bucks County, Pennsylvania. Throughout the marriage, Larrick continued to use her maiden name in her professional life. Crosby and Larrick co-wrote two nonfiction books for children, Rockets into Space (1959) and Rivers, What They Do (1961). Crosby also provided photographs to illustrate one of Larrick's poetry anthologies, Crazy to Be Alive in Such a Strange World (1977).

After 1960, Larrick worked as a freelance writer and editor, taught courses as a visiting professor at New York University and Indiana University, and held a teaching post at Lehigh University until 1975. She delivered lectures at universities in several countries and traveled to Singapore and New Delhi as a representative of the United States Information Agency to gather and share information about children's book publishing abroad.

Retiring to her hometown after Crosby's death in 1980, Larrick continued her editing work and served on the Shenandoah University board of trustees for many years. She died of pneumonia at the age of 93 on November 14, 2004.

== Publishing career ==
Larrick began her career in publishing as editor for the children's magazine Young American Readers (1946–1951) and academic journal The Reading Teacher (1950–1954). In 1962, Larrick edited a series of junior science books for Grosset & Dunlap. In the 1970s, she served as editorial advisor for The Reading Teacher (1970–1976), and poetry editor for the English Journal (1974–1976).

Larrick published A Parent's Guide to Children's Reading, based on her doctoral research, in 1958. The book won the Edison Foundation Award for outstanding contributions to education the following year. A revised edition appeared in 1964, followed by three subsequent editions in 1969, 1975, and 1980, accumulating total sales of over 1.25 million copies. Two derivative books, Encourage Your Child to Read (1980) and Children's Reading Begins at Home (1980), were published for mass market distribution including in grocery stores and sold over 500,000 copies.

Larrick's influential 1965 Saturday Review article, "The All-White World of Children's Books," analyzed thousands of American children's books published between 1962 and 1964 and found a lack of diverse representation in them. The article has been cited by numerous subsequent studies and is often credited with sparking efforts to diversify children's literature which include the creation of identity-based awards such as the Sydney Taylor Book Award and the Coretta Scott King Award. In 1966, Larrick joined Gwendolyn Brooks, Langston Hughes, Ben Shahn, Benjamin Spock, and others in sponsoring the Council on Interracial Books for Children.

Larrick's work to educate parents and the public about children's reading included contributions of articles and book reviews to Library Journal, The New York Times, Parents magazine, Publishers Weekly, and many other national publications.

Throughout her career, Larrick compiled numerous anthologies focused mainly on poetry for and by children. In interviews, she described both producing collections in response to children's expressed reading preferences and, at times, presenting voices and experiences of real children. To Ride a Butterfly (1991), co-edited with Wendy Lamb, was published to mark the twenty-fifth anniversary of Reading is Fundamental. At least two of her other anthologies faced censorship challenges over selections of their content.

== Recognition and awards ==
Larrick was a founding member of the International Reading Association and served as its second president in 1956–1957.

In honor of her contributions to children's literature and education, Larrick received the New York University Founder's Day Achievement Award upon earning her doctorate in 1955. In 1977, she was awarded both the Drexel University Citation and the International Reading Association Certificate of Merit and was inducted to the Reading Hall of Fame. She was named one of "70 Women Who Have Made a Difference in the World of Books" by the Women's National Book Association in 1987.

In recognition of her contributions to education, Goucher College, Lehigh University, and Shenandoah University all granted her honorary doctorates. In 1990, she received the Virginia State Reading Association Literacy Award, and she was named a 1992 Laureate of Virginia for Outstanding Achievement as an Author and Educator.

The Nancy Larrick Crosby Native Plant Trail in the State Arboretum of Virginia at Blandy Experimental Farm is named in her honor.

== Works ==
=== Books for adults ===
- Printing and Promotion Handbook: How to Plan, Produce, and Use Printing, Advertising, and Direct Mail (1949), co-written with Daniel Melcher, New York: McGraw-Hill. LCCN 49-8863 2nd edition (1956). LCCN 56-6966 3rd edition (1966). LCCN 66-14535
- A Parent's Guide to Children's Reading (1958), Garden City, New York: Doubleday. LCCN 58-7361 Revised edition (1964). LCCN 64-11683 Revised and enlarged 3rd edition (1969). LCCN 70-10157 4th edition (1975). LCCN 74-18815 5th edition, completely revised (1982). LCCN 82-24702
- A Teacher's Guide to Children's Books (1960), Columbus, Ohio: Charles E. Merrill. LCCN 60-14777
- A Parent's Guide to Children's Education (1963), New York: Trident. LCCN 63-11005
- Children's Reading Begins at Home: How Parents Can Help Their Young Children (1980), Winston-Salem: Starstream. OCLC 7068988
- Encourage Your Child to Read: A Parent's Primer (1980), illustrations by Susan Gray, New York: Dell. OCLC 8215205
- Let's Do a Poem!: Introducing Poetry to Children through Listening, Singing, Chanting, Impromptu Choral Reading, Body Movement, Dance, and Dramatization; Including 98 Favorite Songs and Poems (1991), New York: Delacorte. ISBN 0-385-30292-4.

=== Edited Collections for Adults ===
- What Is Reading Doing to the Child? Highlights from the Sixteenth Annual Reading Conference of Lehigh University (1967), co-edited with John A. Stoops, Danville, Illinois: Interstate. OCLC 2286782
- Reading, Isn't It Really the Teacher? Highlights of the Seventeenth Annual Reading Conference of Lehigh University (1968), co-edited with Charles J. Versacci, Danville, Illinois: Interstate. OCLC 2286776
- Somebody Turned on a Tap in These Kids: Poetry and Young People Today (1971), New York: Delacorte. LCCN 76-135380

=== Books for children and adolescents ===
- See for Yourself, a First Book of Science Experiments (1952), illustrations by Frank Jupo, New York: Aladdin. LCCN 52-9335
- Color ABC (1959), illustrations by Rene Martin, New York: Platt & Munk. LCCN 59-14420 Republished as First ABC (1965).
- Rockets into Space (1959), co-written with Alexander L. Crosby, illustrations by Denny McMains, New York: Random House. LCCN 59-12360
- Junior Science Book of Rain, Hail, Sleet and Snow (1961), illustrations by Weda Yap, Champaign, Illinois: Garrard. LCCN 61-5488
- Rivers, What They Do (1961), co-written with Alexander L. Crosby, illustrations by William Preston, Racine, Wisconsin: Whitman. LCCN 60-13038

=== Anthologies for children and adolescents ===
- Poems for Young Children (1965), in The Illustrated Treasury of Children's Literature, 2 volumes, edited by Margaret E. Martignoni, illustrations by Kay Lovelace Smith, Chicago : F. E. Compton. LCCN 65-5578
- Piper, Pipe That Song Again!: Poems for Boys and Girls (1965), illustrations by Kelly Oechsli, New York: Random House. LCCN 65-10494
- Poetry for Holidays (1966), illustrations by Kelly Oechsli, Champaign, Illinois: Garrard. LCCN 66-10724
- Green Is like a Meadow of Grass: An Anthology of Children's Pleasure in Poetry (1968), illustrations by Kelly Oechsli, Champaign, Illinois: Garrard. LCCN 68-16159
- On City Streets: An Anthology of Poetry (1968), photographs by David Sagarin, New York: M. Evans. LCCN 68-30505
- Piping down the Valleys Wild: Poetry for the Young of All Ages (1968), illustrations by Ellen Raskin, New York: Delacorte. LCCN 67-19762
- I Heard a Scream in the Street: Poems by Young People in the City (1970), photographs by students, New York: M. Evans. LCCN 79-122820
- The Wheels of the Bus Go Round and Round: School Bus Songs and Chants (1972), illustrations by Gene Holtan, San Carlos, California: Golden Gate Junior. ISBN 0-874-64190-X.
- Male and Female under 18; Frank Comments from Young People about Their Sex Roles Today (1973), co-edited with Eve Merriam, New York: Discus Books. ISBN 0-380-00711-8.
- More Poetry for Holidays (1973), illustrations by Harold Berson, Champaign, Illinois: Garrard. ISBN 0-811-64116-3.
- Room for Me and a Mountain Lion: Poetry of Open Space (1974), New York: M. Evans. ISBN 0-871-31124-0.
- Crazy to Be Alive in Such a Strange World: Poems about People (1977), photographs by Alexander L. Crosby, New York: M. Evans. ISBN 0-871-31225-5.
- Bring Me All of Your Dreams: Poems (1980), photographs by Larry Mulvehill, New York: M. Evans. ISBN 0-871-31313-8.
- Tambourines! Tambourines to Glory!: Prayers and Poems (1982), illustrations by Geri Greinke, Philadelphia: Westminster. ISBN 0-664-32689-7.
- When the Dark Comes Dancing: A Bedtime Poetry Book (1983), illustrations by John Wallner, New York: Philomel. ISBN 0-399-20807-0.
- Cats Are Cats (1988), illustrated by Ed Young, New York: Philomel. ISBN 0-399-21517-4.
- Songs from Mother Goose: With the Traditional Melody for Each (1989), illustrations by Robin Spowart, New York: Harper & Row. ISBN 0-060-23713-9.
- The Merry-Go-Round Poetry Book (1989), illustrations by Karen Gundersheimer, New York: Delacorte. ISBN 0-385-29814-5.
- Mice Are Nice (1990), illustrated by Ed Young, New York: Philomel. ISBN 0-399-21495-X.
- To the Moon and Back: A Collection of Poems (1990), illustrated by Catharine O'Neill, New York: Delacorte. ISBN 0-385-30159-6.
- The Night of the Whippoorwill: Poems (1992), illustrations by David Ray, New York: Philomel. ISBN 0-399-21874-2.
- To Ride a Butterfly: Original Pictures, Stories, Poems, & Songs for Children (1991), co-editor with Wendy Lamb, New York: Bantam Doubleday Dell. ISBN 0-440-50402-3.
