= Kassim's Shoes =

1977 children's book by Harold Berson

- Author: Harold Berson
- Illustrator: Harold Berson
- Language: English
- Genre: Children's fiction; Moroccan folklore
- Published: November 1977
- Publisher: Crown
- Publication place: United States
- Pages: 32 (unpaged)
- ISBN: 0-517-53063-5

Kassim's Shoes is a 1977 children's book by Harold Berson. A retelling of a Moroccan folktale, it was published by Crown to highly positive reviews.

== Synopsis ==
The people of a Moroccan village offer a new pair of shoes to a local merchant, Kassim, in exchange for his old tattered one; mishaps ensue every time he tries to give it away.

== Background ==
Harold Berson's work is a retelling of "Abu Kassim's Shoes", a folktale from Morocco which has circulated across the Middle East since the 14th–15th centuries, and may have entered Europe by way of Spain. The original tale is also known under the titles of "The Shoes of Abu Kasim", "The Pair of Old Slippers", "The Pantofles", "The Everlasting Shoes", and "The Tale of the Qadi and His Slipper" among several other variations. It has also received adaptations by Nancy Green (1963) and Geraldine McCaughrean (1982).

== Reception ==
Reviews for Kassim's Shoes were highly positive, with praise going towards Berson's illustrations. The School Library Journal called it "an attractive picture-story", while the Bulletin of the Center for Children's Books found it "nicely retold". The Christian Science Monitor's Gene Langley predicted that "children will have more fun [than their parents] following the story to its right and proper ending." As Barbara Pierce of the Poughkeepsie Journal said, "Here's proof that a simple, everyday thing can be the basis for a good story, if imaginatively handled."
