= Do You Know What I'm Going to Do Next Saturday? =

1963 book by Helen Palmer Geisel

First edition

Do You Know What I'm Going To Do Next Saturday? is a 1963 children's book published by Beginner Books and written by Helen Palmer Geisel, the first wife of Theodor Seuss Geisel (Dr. Seuss). Unlike most of the Beginner Books, Do You Know What I'm Going To Do Next Saturday? did not follow the format of text with inline drawings, being illustrated with black-and-white photographs by Lynn Fayman, featuring a boy named Rawli Davis. It is sometimes misattributed to Dr. Seuss himself. The book's cover features a photograph of a young boy sitting at a breakfast table with a huge pile of pancakes.

Activities mentioned in the book include bowling, water skiing, marching, boxing, and shooting guns with the United States Marine Corps, and eating more spaghetti "than anyone else has eaten before".

Helen Palmer's photograph-based children's books did not prove to be as popular as the more traditional text-and-illustrations format, but Do You Know What I'm Going To Do Next Saturday received positive reviews and was listed by The New York Times as one of the best children's books of 1963. The book is currently out of print.
