= Eric Gurney =

Canadian-American cartoonist (1910–1992)

- Born: 1910; Winnipeg, Manitoba, Canada
- Died: 1992 (aged 81–82)

Eric Gurney (1910–1992) was a Canadian-American cartoonist and illustrator. He immigrated to the US in 1938 to work with Walt Disney Productions, where he was a story writer and a collaborator on several Disney films. Turning freelance in 1948, he did cartoon illustrations for magazines and advertising campaigns. Gurney is well known for his humorous illustrations in books for children and adults. He received the National Cartoonists Society Advertising and Illustration Award for 1961 and 1971 for his work.

== Early life ==
Born in Winnipeg, Manitoba, Eric Gurney grew up in Toronto, where he began a career as a commercial artist. In 1938 he immigrated to the US to work with The Walt Disney Company, where he was a story writer and collaborated on several Disney films, including Pinocchio, Bambi, Peter and the Wolf, and Pluto cartoons. Turning freelance in 1948, he did cartoon illustrations for magazines and advertising campaigns, notably for the Ethyl Corporation.

== Illustrating career ==
Gurney is best known for his humorous illustrations in books for children and adults. He illustrated Punctured Poems (1971) by Richard Armour; How to Live with a Neurotic Dog (1960) (text by Stephen Baker); How to Live with a Calculating Cat (1962) (text by William Nettleton); an edition of Sportsmanlike Driving (1965), a textbook published by the American Automobile Association, and many other titles, whose total sales number in the millions.

He received the National Cartoonists Society Advertising and Illustration Award for 1961 and 1971 for his work.

His first wife, Nancy Gurney, was his collaborator on several books including The King, the Mice, and the Cheese (1965) and Gurney's Guide to Feathered Friends (1968). He was also the illustrator of other notable Beginner Books including The Digging-est Dog and Hand Hand Fingers Thumb. After her death, Gurney married a second Nancy. They also collaborated on The Return of the Calculating Cat. In later years they resided in Tucson, Arizona.
