= You Will Go to the Moon (book) =

- 1959 edition cover
- Author: Mae and Ira Freeman
- Language: English
- Series: Beginner Books
- Published: 1959 (Random House Childrens Books, a division of Penguin Random House LLC)
- Publication place: United States
- Media type: Print (hardcover)
- ISBN: 978-0-394-80007-3

You Will Go To The Moon is a work of children's literature written by Mae and Ira Freeman and illustrated by Robert Patterson, published in 1959, ten years before the first crewed Moon landing. The first edition was reprinted in England in 1962 under the same title. A second edition was published in 1971, with new illustrations reflecting NASA's Project Apollo. This was reprinted in England in 1973 under the title Going to the Moon.

The book is a children's story in the Beginner Books series, written using a restricted vocabulary of simple words for a readership age of six. The illustrations show a lunar mission concept based on the Wernher von Braun and Willy Ley space exploration concepts of 1952 ("Man Will Conquer Space Soon!"), featuring winged three-stage rockets ferrying the passengers to a rotating-wheel space station, serving as a transfer station to the spider-like lunar surface shuttle.

The writing is unusual in that it is written in the second-person future tense.
