= I Wish That I Had Duck Feet =

Book by Dr. Seuss

- Author: Theo. LeSieg (Dr. Seuss)
- Illustrator: B. Tobey
- Language: English
- Genre: Children's literature
- Publisher: Random House
- Publication place: United States
- English publication date: August 12, 1965 (renewed in 1993)
- Media type: Print (hardcover)
- Pages: 64
- OCLC: 648751
- Preceded by: Ten Apples Up on Top!
- Followed by: Come over to My House

I Wish That I Had Duck Feet is a children's book written by Dr. Seuss, illustrated by B. Tobey, and first published in 1965. "Theo. LeSieg" was a pen name of Theodor Geisel, who is more commonly known as Dr. Seuss. The story is about a boy who wishes that he could have many different animal body parts. For each body part, he finds fantastic uses for them, as well as their problematic aspects. At the end, he decides that he is happiest being himself.

== Plot ==
The story begins with a boy—the main narrator—who imagines having duck feet; after all, if he did, he would never have to worry about keeping them dry. If he had duck feet, he would never wear shoes and would brag to Big Bill Brown that those feet are the only ones in town. The boy pictures himself swimming in a pond with ducks. But there’s a catch: if he actually had duck feet, his mother would be furious, since they would be far too wet for the floors inside the house—which means duck feet are simply out of the question.

Now the boy dreams of having a massive pair of deer antlers. If he had antlers, he could stack ten hats on them at once—whereas Big Bill could only manage to wear one. When the boy would play ball, nothing and no one could possibly stop him. With antlers, he could carry anything he wanted on them—even apples for his teacher. But with such enormous antlers, there is no way he would ever fit inside the school bus.

So instead, the boy wishes to have a whale's spout. If he had a blowhole, he could use it to keep his classroom cool on hot days. In the summer, he could play outside all day long and would surely beat Big Bill at tennis. But his mother would never, ever allow him to bring a whale’s spout inside the house.

And so, now the boy dreams of having a long—a very, very long—tail. He would use his tail as a jump rope, and also to pull girls along behind him while riding his bicycle. With a tail that long, he could swat a fly from ten feet away. But such a long tail would present a problem: Big Bill could tie it to a tree, and the boy would never be able to get back down.

And now, the boy wants to have an elephant’s trunk. He would use this trunk to reach things that are too high up. With such a long "nose," he could sneeze at Big Bill and blow him right off his feet. The boy could use his trunk to help firefighters put out fires. But if he had such a long nose, Dad would make him wash the car—and the entire house, too. The boy decides that working all day with a "hose" like that wouldn't be any fun at all.

Then, a thought suddenly strikes the boy: if he had all these body parts at the same time, he would turn into a "WHICH-WHAT-WHO". If he were a Which-What-Who, he would go bounding all over the place, scaring the townspeople, who would call the police and the animal catcher, who would catch him in a net and send him to the zoo, where he would have to eat hay twice a day—and neither he, nor his family and friends, would like that one bit.

In the end, the boy decides that he wants to be himself. The final illustration shows him tossing the animal body parts into a trash can.

== See also ==
- List of Dr. Seuss books
