= Beginner Books =

Publishing imprint of Random House

- Parent company: Random House
- Founded: 1957
- Founder: Phyllis Fraser; Dr. Seuss; Helen Palmer
- Country of origin: United States
- Headquarters location: New York City
- Publication types: Books
- Official website: www.penguinrandomhouse.com/series/BBK/beginner-booksr

Beginner Books is the Random House imprint for young children ages 3–9, co-founded by Phyllis Cerf with Ted Geisel, more often known as Dr. Seuss, and his wife Helen Palmer Geisel. Their first book was Dr. Seuss's The Cat in the Hat (1957), whose title character appears in the brand's logo. Cerf compiled a list of 379 words as the basic vocabulary for young readers, along with another 20 slightly harder "emergency" words. No more than 200 words were taken from that list to write The Cat in the Hat. Subsequent books in the series were modeled on the same requirement.

Beginner Books had only four titles in their catalog in 1958. Two years later, they were earning 1 million dollars a year. Random House acquired Beginner Books in 1960 and was the largest publisher of children's books in the United States.

== Early contributors ==
=== Authors ===
When Theodor Seuss Geisel illustrated his own stories, he wrote as Dr. Seuss. When others created the illustrations, he used either the pseudonym Theo. LeSieg or Rosetta Stone. Other authors of early Beginner Books were Robert Lopshire, Bennett Cerf, Al Perkins, Helen Palmer Geisel (who wrote as Helen Palmer), Philip Dey Eastman, Stan and Jan Berenstain, Benjamin Elkin and Marion Holland.

=== Illustrators ===
Early Beginner Books employed many famous illustrators, including the aforementioned Theodor Seuss Geisel, P. D. Eastman, Stan and Jan Berenstain, and Robert Lopshire. Roy McKie was also an illustrator.

== List of Beginner Books ==
ID	Title	Year released	Author	Illustrator
B-1	The Cat in the Hat	1957	Dr. Seuss	
B-2	The Cat in the Hat Comes Back	1958	Dr. Seuss	
B-3	A Fly Went By	1958	Michael McClintock	Fritz Siebel
B-4	The Big Jump and Other Stories	1958	Benjamin Elkin	Katherine Evans
B-5	A Big Ball of String	1958/1993	Marion Holland	Marion Holland (later Roy McKie)
B-6	Sam and the Firefly	1958	P. D. Eastman	
B-7	Going to the Moon (U.K.)/You Will Go to the Moon	1959 (later revised edition in 1971)	Mae and Ira Freeman	Robert Patterson (later Lee Ames)
B-8	Cowboy Andy	1959	Edna Walker Chandler	E. Raymond Kinstler
B-9	The Whales Go By	1959	Fred Phleger	Paul Galdone
B-10	Stop that Ball!	1959	Michael McClintock	Fritz Siebel
B-11	Bennett Cerf's Book of Laughs	1959	Bennett Cerf	Carl Rose
B-12	Ann Can Fly	1959	Fred Phleger	Robert Lopshire
B-13	One Fish, Two Fish, Red Fish, Blue Fish	1960	Dr. Seuss	
B-14	The King's Wish and Other Stories	1960	Benjamin Elkin	Leonard Shortall
B-15	Bennett Cerf's Book of Riddles	1960/1999 (part of Riddles and More Riddles)	Bennett Cerf	Roy McKie
B-16	Green Eggs and Ham	1960	Dr. Seuss	
B-17	Put Me in the Zoo	1960	Robert Lopshire	
B-18	Are You My Mother?	1960	P. D. Eastman	
B-19	Ten Apples Up on Top!	1961/1998/2004	Dr. Seuss (writing as Theo. LeSieg)	Roy McKie
B-20	Go, Dog. Go!	1961	P. D. Eastman	
B-21	Little Black, a Pony	1961	Walter Farley	
B-22	Look Out for Pirates!	1961	Iris Vinton	H. B. Vestal
B-23	A Fish Out of Water	1961	Helen Palmer	P. D. Eastman
B-24	More Riddles	1961/1999 (part of Riddles and More Riddles)	Bennett Cerf	Roy McKie
B-25	Robert the Rose Horse	1962	Joan Heilbroner	P. D. Eastman
B-26	I Was Kissed by a Seal at the Zoo	1962	Helen Palmer	Lynn Fayman (photographs)
B-27	Snow	1962	Roy McKie and P. D. Eastman	
B-28	The Berenstain Bears: The Big Honey Hunt (reissue)/The Big Honey Hunt	1962	Stan and Jan Berenstain	
B-29	Hop on Pop: The Simplest Seuss for Youngest Use	1963	Dr. Seuss	
B-30	Dr. Seuss's ABC	1963	Dr. Seuss	
B-31	Do You Know What I'm Going to Do Next Saturday?	1963	Helen Palmer	Lynn Fayman (photographs)
B-32	Summer	1963/2001	Alice Low	Roy McKie
B-33	Little Black Goes to the Circus	1963	Walter Farley	
B-34	Bennett Cerf's Book of Animal Riddles	1964	Bennett Cerf	Roy McKie
B-35	Why I Built the Boogle House	1964	Helen Palmer	Lynn Fayman (photographs)
B-36	The Bike Lesson (U.K.)/The Berenstain Bears: The Bike Lesson (reissue)/The Bike Lesson: Another Adventure of the Berenstain Bears	1964	Stan and Jan Berenstain	
B-37	The Beginner Book of Things To Make: previously published as How to Make Flibbers, etc. (reissue)/How to Make Flibbers, etc.: A Book of Things to Make and Do	1964	Robert Lopshire	
	The Cat in the Hat Dictionary (U.K.)/The Cat in the Hat Beginner Book Dictionary	1964	P. D. Eastman (credited as by the Cat himself and P. D. Eastman)	
B-38	Fox in Socks (reissue)/Fox in Socks: A Tongue Twister for Super Children	1965	Dr. Seuss	
B-39	The King, the Mice and the Cheese	1965	Nancy and Eric Gurney	Eric Gurney
B-40	I Wish That I Had Duck Feet	1965	Dr. Seuss (writing as Theo. LeSieg)	B Tobey
B-41	The Berenstain Bears: The Bears' Picnic (reissue)/The Bears' Picnic	1966	Stan and Jan Berenstain	
B-42	Don and Donna Go to Bat	1966	Al Perkins	B Tobey
B-43	You Will Live Under the Sea	1966	Fred Phleger	Ward Brackett
B-44	Come over to My House	1966/2016	Dr. Seuss (writing as Theo. LeSieg)	Richard Erdoes (later Katie Kath)
B-45	Babar Loses His Crown	1967 (later released in 2004)	Laurent de Brunhoff	
B-46	The Berenstain Bears: The Bear Scouts (reissue)/The Bear Scouts	1967	Stan and Jan Berenstain	
B-47	The Digging-est Dog	1967	Al Perkins	Eric Gurney
B-48	Hugh Loftings' Travels of Dr. Dolittle	1967	Al Perkins	Philip Wende
	The Cat in the Hat Songbook	1967	Dr. Seuss, piano score and guitar chords by Eugene Poddany	Dr. Seuss
B-49	Hugh Loftings' Doctor Dolittle and the Pirates	1968	Al Perkins	Philip Wende
B-50	Off to the Races	1968	Fred and Marjorie Phleger	Leo Summers
B-51	The Best Nest	1968	P. D. Eastman	
B-52	The Berenstain Bears: The Bears' Vacation (reissue)/The Bears' Holiday (U.K.)/The Bears' Vacation	1968	Stan and Jan Berenstain	
B-53	Ian Flemings' Story of Chitty Chitty Bang Bang! the Magical Car	1968	Al Perkins	B Tobey
B-54	King Midas and the Golden Touch	1969	Al Perkins	Harold Berson
	My Book about Me	1969	Dr. Seuss and Roy McKie	
	I Can Draw It Myself	1970	Dr. Seuss	
B-55	The Berenstain Bears: The Bears' Christmas (reissue)/The Bears' Christmas	1970	Stan and Jan Berenstain	
	Some of Us Walk, Some Fly, Some Swim	1971	Michael K. Frith	
B-56	Tubby and the Lantern	1971	Al Perkins	Rowland B. Wilson
B-57	Tubby and the Poo-Bah	1972	Al Perkins	Rowland B. Wilson
	The Berenstain Bears in: The Bears' Almanac	1973	Stan and Jan Berenstain	
B-58	Autographs! I Collect Them (reissue)/My Amazing Book of Autographs	1974	Michael K. Frith	
B-59	Wacky Wednesday	1974	Dr. Seuss (writing as Theo. LeSieg)	George Booth
B-60	The Berenstain Bears: The Bear Detectives: The Case of the Missing Pumpkin (reissue)/The Bear Detectives: The Case of the Missing Pumpkin	1975	Stan and Jan Berenstain	
B-61	Because a Little Bug Went Ka-Choo!	1975	Dr. Seuss (writing as Rosetta Stone)	Michael K. Frith
B-62	Oh, the Thinks You Can Think!	1975	Dr. Seuss	
B-63	Please Try to Remember the First of Octember!	1977	Dr. Seuss (writing as Theo. LeSieg)	Art Cumings
B-64	I Can Read with My Eyes Shut!	1978	Dr. Seuss	
B-65	Oh Say Can You Say?	1979	Dr. Seuss	
B-66	The Berenstain Bears and the Missing Dinosaur Bone	1980	Stan and Jan Berenstain	
B-67	Maybe You Should Fly a Jet! Maybe You Should Be a Vet!	1980/2020	Dr. Seuss (writing as Theo. LeSieg)	Michael J. Smollin (later Kelly Kennedy)
B-68	It's Not Easy Being a Bunny	1983	Marilyn Sadler	Roger Bollen
B-69	Spooky Riddles	1983	Marc Brown	
B-70	What Do Smurfs Do All Day?	1983	Peyo	
B-71	The Very Bad Bunny	1984	Marilyn Sadler	Roger Bollen
B-72	I Want to Be Somebody New!: The Sequel to Put Me in the Zoo (reissue)/I Want To Be Somebody New!	1986	Robert Lopshire	
B-73	The Black Stallion	1986	Walter Farley	Sandy Rabinowitz
B-74	I Am Not Going to Get Up Today!	1987	Dr. Seuss	James Stevenson
B-75	The Cat's Quizzer	1976/1993	Dr. Seuss	
	Beginning Readers' Yearbook 1994	1994		
	The Big Blue Book of Beginner Books	1994		
B-76	Stop, Train, Stop! A Thomas the Tank Engine Story	1995	Wilbert Awdry	Owen Bell
	The Big Red Book of Beginner Books	1995		
B-77	New Tricks I Can Do!	1996	Robert Lopshire	
B-78	Anthony the Perfect Monster	1996	Angelo DeCesare	
	The Big Book of Berenstain Bears Beginner Books	1996	Stan and Jan Berenstain	
B-79	4 Pups and a Worm	1996	Eric Seltzer	
B-80	Honey Bunny Funnybunny	1997	Marilyn Sadler	Roger Bollen
B-81	Come Down Now, Flying Cow!	1997	Timothy Roland	
B-82	Can You Tell Me How to Get to Sesame Street?	1997	Eleanor Hudson	Joe Mathieu
	The Big Green Book of Beginner Books	1997/2022		
	Put Me in the Alphabet!: A Beginner Workbook About ABC's	1997	Robert Lopshire	
	I Want to Count Something New: A Beginner Workbook About 123's	1997	Robert Lopshire	
	Pigs of a Feather	1998	Tish Rabe	Michael Letzig
	Match This, P. J. Funnybunny!: A Beginner Workbook About Matching and Sorting	1998	Marilyn Sadler	Roger Bollen
	What's Next, P. J. Funnybunny?: A Beginner Workbook About Sequencing	1998	Marilyn Sadler and Judith Conaway	Roger Bollen
B-83	Mercer Mayer's Critters of the Night: Roast & Toast	1998	Erica Farber and J. R. Sansevere	
B-84	Monster Munchies	1998	Laura Numeroff	Nate Evans
B-85	Babe the Sheep Pig: A Little Pig Goes a Long Way	1999	Mallory Loehr	Christopher Moroney
B-86	The Land Before Time	1999	Molly Goode	Beverly Lazor-Bahr
B-87	Riddles and More Riddles!: Previously Published as Bennett Cerf's Book of Riddles and More Riddles	1960/1961/1999	Bennett Cerf	Debbie Palen
B-88	Flap Your Wings	1969/1977/2000	P. D. Eastman	
B-89	The Berenstain Bears: That Stump Must Go!	2000	Stan and Jan Berenstain	
B-90	Paws and Claws	2001	Erica Farber and J. R. Sansevere	
B-91	Thomas and Friends: A Crack In the Track	2001	Wilbert Awdry	Tommy Stubbs
B-92	Big Dog...Little Dog	1973/2003	P. D. Eastman	
B-93	Thomas and Friends: Go, Train, Go! A Companion Book to Stop, Train, Stop!	2005	Wilbert Awdry	Tommy Stubbs
B-94	Fred and Ted Go Camping	2005	Peter Eastman	
B-95	Mrs. Wow Never Wanted a Cow	2006	Martha Freeman	Steven Salerno
B-96	Fred and Ted Like to Fly	2007	Peter Eastman	
B-97	The Belly Book	2008	Joe Harris	
B-98	Thomas and Friends: Trains, Cranes & Troublesome Trucks	2008	Wilbert Awdry	Tommy Stubbs
B-99	Have You Seen My Dinosaur?	2010	Jon Surgal	Joe Mathieu
B-100	Fred and Ted's Road Trip	2011	Peter Eastman	
	The Big Book of Berenstain Bears Beginner Books	2011	Stan and Jan Berenstain	
	My Big Book of Beginner Books about Me	2011		
	The Big Purple Book of Beginner Books	2012		
B-101	A Pet Named Sneaker	2013	Joan Heilbroner	Pascal Lemaitre
	Thomas' Big Book of Beginner Books	2013		
B-102	Squirrels on Skis	2013	J. Hamilton Ray	Pascal Lemaitre
	The Big Orange Book of Beginner Books	2015		
	The Big Aqua Book of Beginner Books	2017		
B-103	DC Super Friends: Catch That Crook	2018	Laura Hitchcock	Elisabetta Melaranci and Giulia Priori
B-104	DreamWorks' Trolls: Too Many Cupcakes	2018	David Lewman	Fabio Laguna and Grace Mills
B-105	What Pet Should I Get?	2015/2019	Dr. Seuss	
B-106	Dr. Seuss's 123	2019		
B-107	A Skunk in My Bunk!	2019	Christopher Cerf	Nicola Slater
B-108	Can You See Me?	2019	Bob Staake	
B-109	Shut the Door!	1993/2020	Robert Lopshire	Maria Karipidou
B-110	If I Had Your Vote	2020	Alastair Heim	Tom Brannon
B-111	The Pink Book	2020	Diane Muldrow	Mike Yamada
B-112	A Ticket for Cricket	2021	Molly Coxe	
B-113	If I Ran Your School	2021	Alastair Heim	Tom Brannon
B-114	I Can Be Anything!	2021	Bob Staake	
B-115	It's Better Being a Bunny	2022	Marilyn Sadler	Tim Bowers
B-116	Busy Street	2022	Edward Miller	
B-117	If I Were Saint Nick: A Christmas Story	2022	Alastair Heim	Tom Brannon
B-118	How to Love a Pony	2023	Michelle Meadows	Sawyer Cloud
	The Big Violet Book of Beginner Books	2023		
B-119	Bunny with a Big Heart	2023	Marilyn Sadler	Tim Bowers
B-120	Dr. Seuss's If You Think There's Nothing to Do	2024		
B-121	If I Drove An Ice Cream Truck	2024	Alastair Heim	Tom Brannon
B-122	How to Love a Kitten	2024	Michelle Meadows	Sawyer Cloud
B-123	Hello, Sun	2025	Lala Watkins	
B-124	Gertrude Gish on a Dish on a Fish	2025	Sarah Hwang	
B-125	Best Bunny Brother Ever	2026	Marilyn Sadler	Tim Bowers
B-126	If It Were My Birthday Party	2026	Alastair Heim	Tom Brannon
B-127	Momo Sees the Sea	2026	Avani Dwivedi	
B-128	A Trip with BLIP	2026	Jerrard K. Polk	
B-129	Dinosaur Day	2026	Edward Miller	
B-130	Two Chilly Mice	2026	Lori Haskins Houran	

=== Book Club ===
- Grolier Book Club Beginner Book Series
- Scholastic Book Club Beginner Book Series
- Early Moments Book Club Beginner Book Series

== Bright and Early Books for Beginning Beginners ==
The following books are for younger children and are technically part of the series. The "BE" designation stands for Bright and Early.

ID	Title	Print status	Year released	Author	Illustrator	Grade level equivalent (Scholastic)	Lexile measure
BE-1	The Foot Book		1968	Dr. Seuss		1.1	
BE-2	The Eye Book		1968/1999	Dr. Seuss (writing as Theo. LeSieg)	Roy McKie (later Joe Mathieu)	1.3	140L
BE-3	The Ear Book		1968/2007	Al Perkins	William O'Brian (later Henry Payne)	2.4	
BE-4	The Berenstain Bears: Inside Outside Upside Down/Inside, Outside, Upside Down		1968	Stan and Jan Berenstain ("by" credit on the original issue cover)		1.6	
BE-5	Hand, Hand, Fingers, Thumb		1969	Al Perkins	Eric Gurney	1.5	
BE-6	The Berenstain Bears: Bears on Wheels/Bears on Wheels: A Bright and Early Counting Book	Grolier and Early Moments only	1969	Stan and Jan Berenstain ("by" credit on the former prints)		1.2	
BE-7	Mr. Brown Can Moo! Can You? Dr. Seuss's Book of Wonderful Noises		1970	Dr. Seuss		2.9	
BE-8	The Nose Book	Grolier and Early Moments only	1970/2002	Al Perkins	Roy McKie (later Joe Mathieu)	1.5	290L
BE-9	The Berenstain Bears: Old Hat New Hat/Old Hat, New Hat		1970	Stan and Jan Berenstain ("by" credit on the original issue cover)		1.7	
BE-10	The Berenstain Bears: Bears in the Night/Bears in the Night		1971	Stan and Jan Berenstain ("by" credit on the original issue cover)		1.1	
BE-11	Berenstains' B Book/The Berenstains' B Book	Grolier and Early Moments only	1971	Stan and Jan Berenstain (both credited on the reissue)			
	I Can Write	Grolier and Early Moments only	1971	Dr. Seuss (writing as Theo. LeSieg)	Roy McKie		
BE-12	In a People House		1972	Dr. Seuss (writing as Theo. LeSieg)	Roy McKie	2.5	
BE-13	Marvin K. Mooney Will You Please Go Now!		1972	Dr. Seuss		2.4	100L
BE-14	C Is for Clown: A Circus of "C" Words/Berenstains' C Book	Grolier and Early Moments only	1972	Stan and Jan Berenstain ("by" credit on the original issue)			
BE-15	The Pop-Up Mice of Mr. Brice/The Many Mice of Mr. Brice	out of print	1973	Dr. Seuss (writing as Theo. LeSieg)	Roy McKie		
BE-16	The Shape of Me and Other Stuff		1973	Dr. Seuss		2.4	350L
BE-17	I'll Teach My Dog 100 Words		1973	Michael Frith	P. D. Eastman		
BE-18	There's a Wocket in My Pocket!		1974	Dr. Seuss		2.1	320L
BE-19	Great Day for Up		1974	Dr. Seuss (by)	Quentin Blake (pictures by)	1.9	
BE-20	The Berenstain Bears: He Bear, She Bear/He Bear, She Bear		1974	Stan and Jan Berenstain ("by" credit on the original issue cover)		2.5	460L
BE-21	Would You Rather Be a Bullfrog?		1975	Dr. Seuss (as Theo. LeSieg)	Roy McKie		
BE-22	Hooper Humperdink...? Not Him!		1976/2006	Dr. Seuss (as Theo. LeSieg)	Charles E. Martin (later Scott Nash)		
BE-23	The Berenstain Bears and the Spooky Old Tree		1978	Stan and Jan Berenstain		1.7	100L
BE-24	The Hair Book		1979/2019	Graham Tether	Roy McKie (later Andrew Joyner)		
BE-25	The Tooth Book		1981/2000	Dr. Seuss (as Theo. LeSieg)	Roy McKie (later Joe Mathieu)	2.6	400L
BE-26	Wings on Things	Grolier and Early Moments only	1982	Marc Brown		2.1	180L
BE-27	The Berenstain Bears on the Moon		1985	Stan and Jan Berenstain		1.7	40L
BE-28	Snug House, Bug House!	Grolier and Early Moments only	1994	Susan Schade and Jon Buller		1.5	
BE-29	Snow Bugs	Grolier and Early Moments only	1996	Susan Schade and Jon Buller			
BE-30	Berenstains' A Book	Grolier and Early Moments only	1997	Stan and Jan Berenstain			
BE-31	It's Not Easy Being Big!	Grolier and Early Moments only	1998	Stephanie St. Pierre	John Lund		
BE-32	Mama Loves	Scholastic Book Club only	1999	Molly Goode			
BE-33	Bear in the Big Blue House: Where is Bear?	out of print	1999	Tish Rabe			
BE-34	Richard Scarry's Chuckle with Huckle! and Other Easy-to-Read Funny Stories	Early Moments only	2005	Jane E. Gerver	Richard Scarry II		
BE-35	The Knee Book	Early Moments only	2005	Graham Tether			
BE-36	Money Money Honey Bunny		2006	Marilyn Sadler	Roger Bollen		
BE-37	Thomas and Friends: Blue Train, Green Train		2006	Rev. W. Awdry			
BE-38	Harry and His Bucket Full of Dinosaurs – X Marks the Spot	out of print	2007	R. Schuyler Hooke	Art Mawhinney		
BE-39	Thomas and Friends: Fast Train, Slow Train	out of print	2009	Rev W. Awdry			
BE-40	Ten Eggs in a Nest	Early Moments and eBook only	2014	Marilyn Sadler	Michael Fleming		
BE-41	The Alphabet Book		1974/2000/2015	P. D. Eastman; Peter Eastman			
	The Big Book of Berenstain Bears Stories		2016	Stan and Jan Berenstain			
BE-42	Dr. Seuss's Book of Animals		2018	Dr. Seuss			
BE-43	Dr. Seuss's Book of Colors		2018	Dr. Seuss			

=== Book Club ===
- Grolier Bright and Early Book Series
- Scholastic Bright and Early Book Series
- Early Moments Bright and Early Book Series

== Bright and Early Board Books ==
Most, if not all, of these books are abridged versions of Beginner Books or Bright and Early Books. These books are not numbered.

- The Alphabet Book by P. D. Eastman, additional materials by Peter Eastman
- I'll Teach My Dog a Lot of Words, written by Michael Frith, illustrated by P. D. Eastman
- Big Dog...Little Dog by P. D. Eastman
- Are You My Mother? by P. D. Eastman
- Eres mi Mama? by P. D. Eastman
- Go, Dog. Go! P.D. Eastman's Book of Things That Go, illustrated by P. D. Eastman
- Ve, Perro. Ve! by P. D. Eastman
- Fred and Ted Like to Fly by Peter Eastman
- The Snowman illustrated by Raymond Briggs – Note: The only Bright and Early Board Book without any words
- What Time Is It? by P. D. Eastman (eBook only)
- The Berenstain Bears: Old Hat, New Hat by the Berenstains
- Sombrero Viejo, Sombrero Nuevo by the Berenstains (out of print)
- The Berenstain Bears: Inside, Outside, Upside Down by the Berenstains
- The Berenstain Bears: He Bear, She Bear by the Berenstains
- Summer by Alice Low, illustrated by Roy McKie
- Put Me In The Zoo: A Book of Colors by Robert Lopshire
- Stop, Train, Stop! by Rev. W. Awdry
- Para, Trencito, Para! by Rev. W. Awdry (out of print)
- Blue Train, Green Train by Rev. W. Awdry
- Dr. Seuss's ABC: An Amazing Alphabet Book! by Dr. Seuss
- Fox In Socks: Dr. Seuss's Book of Tongue Twisters by Dr. Seuss
- Hop on Pop by Dr. Seuss
- Ten Apples Up On Top! by Dr. Seuss (writing as Theo. LeSieg), illustrated by Roy McKie – Note: This book is a 1998 recolor edition.
- There's a Wocket in My Pocket! Dr. Seuss's Book of Ridiculous Rhymes by Dr. Seuss
- Oh, the Thinks You Can Think! by Dr. Seuss
- Mr. Brown Can Moo! Can You? Dr. Seuss's Book of Wonderful Noises by Dr. Seuss
- The Shape of Me and Other Stuff: Dr. Seuss's Surprising Word Book by Dr. Seuss
- Would You Rather Be a Bullfrog? by Dr. Seuss (writing as Theo. LeSieg), illustrated by Roy McKie
- The Many Mice of Mr. Brice by Dr. Seuss (writing as Theo. LeSieg), illustrated by Roy McKie
- The Ear Book by Al Perkins, illustrated by Henry Payne
- Hand, Hand, Fingers, Thumb by Al Perkins, illustrated by Eric Gurney
- The Nose Book by Al Perkins, illustrated by Joe Mathieu
- The Tooth Book by Dr. Seuss (writing as Theo. LeSieg), illustrated by Joe Mathieu
- The Eye Book by Dr. Seuss (writing as Theo. LeSieg), illustrated by Joe Mathieu
- The Foot Book: Dr. Seuss's Wacky Book of Opposites by Dr. Seuss

== Big Bright and Early Board Books ==
- Fast Train, Slow Train by Rev W. Awdry
- Would You Rather Be a Bullfrog? by Dr. Seuss (writing as Theo. LeSieg), illustrated by Roy McKie
- Dr. Seuss's ABC: An Amazing Alphabet Book! by Dr. Seuss
- The Berenstain Bears and the Spooky Old Tree by Stan and Jan Berenstain
- Oh, the Thinks You Can Think! by Dr. Seuss
- Mr. Brown Can Moo! Can You?: Dr. Seuss's Book of Wonderful Noises by Dr. Seuss
- Trains, Cranes and Troublesome Trucks by Rev W. Awdry
- The Many Mice of Mr. Brice by Dr. Seuss (writing as Theo. LeSieg), illustrated by Roy McKie
- Fox in Socks: Dr. Seuss's Book of Tongue Twisters by Dr. Seuss
- Are You My Mother? written and illustrated by P. D. Eastman
- Hop on Pop: The Simplest Seuss for Toddlers Use by Dr. Seuss
- Go, Dog. Go!: P. D. Eastman's Book of Things That Go by P. D. Eastman
- The Big Box of Bright and Early Board Books About Me (The Foot Book: Dr. Seuss's Wacky Book of Opposites, The Eye Book, The Nose Book, The Tooth Book)
- The Eye Book by Dr. Seuss (writing as Theo. LeSieg), illustrated by Joe Mathieu
- The Foot Book: Dr. Seuss's Wacky Book of Opposites by Dr. Seuss
- Hand, Hand, Fingers, Thumb by Al Perkins, illustrated by Eric Gurney
- The Tooth Book by Dr. Seuss (writing as Theo. LeSieg), illustrated by Joe Mathieu
- The Nose Book by Al Perkins, illustrated by Joe Mathieu
- There's a Wocket in My Pocket!: Dr. Seuss's Book of Ridiculous Rhymes by Dr. Seuss
- The Berenstain Bears: Inside, Outside, Upside Down by Stan and Jan Berenstain (Kohl's-exclusive)
- The Alphabet Book by P. D. Eastman, additional materials by Peter Eastman (Kohl's-exclusive)
- Put Me in the Zoo: A Book of Colors by Robert Lopshire (Kohl's-exclusive)

== Bright and Early Bath Books ==
- One Fish, Two Fish, Red Fish, Blue Fish by Dr. Seuss (only Bright and Early Bath Book)

== See also ==
- Ladybird Books
