= Robert Lopshire =

American author and illustrator (1927–2002)

- Born: Robert M. Lopshire; April 14, 1927 Sarasota, Florida, U.S.
- Died: May 4, 2002 (aged 75) Gainesville, Florida, U.S.
- Genre: Children's literature
- Years active: 1959–2002
- Notable works: Put Me in the Zoo (1960)

Robert Lopshire (April 14, 1927 – May 4, 2002) is best known for his popular children's book Put Me In the Zoo.

== Life and career ==
Lopshire was born in Sarasota, Florida. He attended the city's elementary and high schools. Lophsire served in the Navy Coast Guard during World War II in the Pacific theater aboard assault landing ships.

Lopshire is best known for being an author, illustrator, and for a short time early in his career, the creative art director for Beginner Books. He wrote the best selling children's book, Put Me in the Zoo, published in 1960.

== Bibliography ==
=== As author and illustrator ===
- Put Me in the Zoo (his first writings)
- I Want to Be Somebody New! – a sequel to Put Me in the Zoo/I Want To Be Somebody New!
- New Tricks I Can Do!
- Put Me in the Alphabet!
- I Want to Count Something New! (his final work before his death)
- The Biggest, Smallest, Fastest, Tallest Things You've Ever Heard of
- I Am Better Than You
- ABC Games
- It's Magic
- A Beginner's Guide to Building & Flying Model Airplanes
- How to make Snop Snappers & Other Fine Things
- The Beginner Book of Things to Make: Fun Stuff You Can Make all by Yourself (formerly published as How to make Flibbers, etc: A Book of Things to Make & Do)

=== As illustrator ===
- Ann Can Fly by Fred Phleger (his first pictures)
- Wish Again, Big Bear by Richard Margolis
- Little New Kangaroo by Bernard Wiseman
- The Pig War by Betty Baker
- Big Max by Kin Platt
- Big Max in the Mystery of the Missing Moose by Kin Platt

=== With others / collections ===
- The Big Blue Book of Beginner Books (featuring Put Me In The Zoo)
- The Big Red Book of Beginner Books (featuring I Want To Be Somebody New!)
- The Big Aqua Book of Beginner Books (featuring New Tricks I Can Do! – his final work after his death on May 4, 2002)
