= Tariffs in the Trump administration =

Tariffs in the Trump administration may refer to:

- Tariffs in the first Trump administration (2017–2021)
- Tariffs in the second Trump administration (2025–present)
