= Marion Holland =

American children's book writer and illustrator (1908–1989)

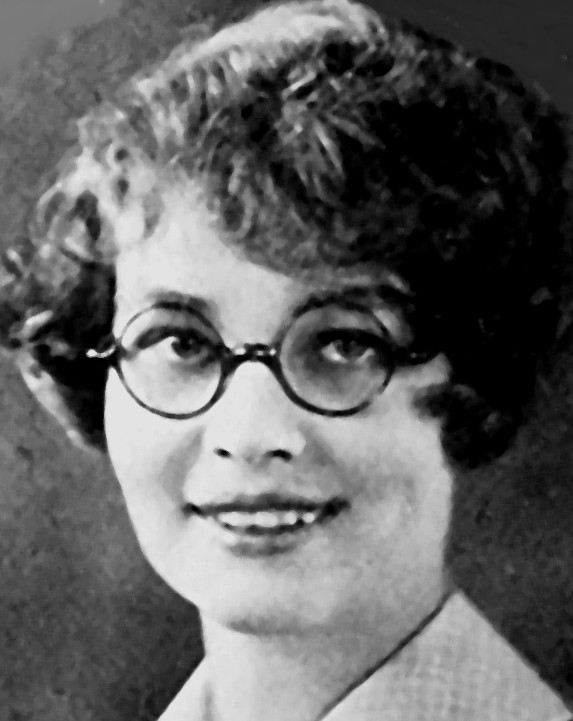
- Marion Holland c. 1929
- Born: July 17, 1908 Washington, D.C., United States
- Died: April 8, 1989 (aged 80)

Marion Holland (July 17, 1908 – April 6, 1989) was an American children's book writer and illustrator from Washington, D.C. Her best-known books were A Big Ball of String; No Children, No Pets; Billy Had a System; and The Secret Horse. A Big Ball of String (1958), which sold more than a million copies, was one of the six original Beginner Books published by Random House, along with The Cat in the Hat by Dr. Seuss.

== Personal life ==
Born on July 17, 1908, in Washington, D.C., Holland graduated from Central High School and Swarthmore College. She had five children. Her first marriage, to Evaristo Murray, ended in divorce. They had a daughter, Barbara Holland, who also became a writer. Holland had four children with her second husband, Thomas W. Holland: Nicholas Holland, Judith Clarke, Rebecca Snyder, and Andrew Holland.

== Career ==
Holland illustrated most of her books, often using her children as models. Her reminiscences about growing up in the Washington area were published in The Washington Post and The Washington Star, and she often corresponded with Post columnist William Raspberry. "It was uncanny how often Marion Holland's letters seemed to come precisely when I was stuck for a column idea," Raspberry wrote. "It was in her letters that her trenchant wit and sardonic wisdom came to the fore."

Holland died of cancer on April 6, 1989, in Washington, D.C.

== Bibliography ==
- Billy Had a System. Alfred A. Knopf. 1952.
- Billy's Clubhouse. Alfred A. Knopf. 1955.
- No Children, No Pets. Alfred A. Knopf. 1956.
- A Tree for Teddy/The Christmas Tree Crisis. Scholastic Books. 1977 [Alfred A. Knopf: 1957].
- A Big Ball of String. Random House. 1993 [1958].
- No Room for a Dog. Random House. 1959.
- Muggsy. Alfred A. Knopf. 1959.
- The Secret Horse. Scholastic Paperbacks. 1988 [Little, Brown: 1959].
- Teddy's Camp-Out. Alfred A. Knopf. 1963.
- Billy's Raccoon. Science Research Associates. 1963.
- Casey Jones Rides Vanity. Little, Brown. 1964.
