= I Can Lick 30 Tigers Today! and Other Stories =

Book by Dr. Seuss

- Author: Dr. Seuss
- Illustrator: Dr. Seuss
- Language: English
- Genre: Children's literature
- Publisher: Random House
- Publication date: September 12, 1969
- Publication place: United States
- Media type: Print (hardback & paperback)
- ISBN: 0-394-80094-X
- Preceded by: The Foot Book
- Followed by: My Book about ME

I Can Lick 30 Tigers Today! and Other Stories is a 1969 children's story book by Dr. Seuss. According to the inside cover, the three stories in the collection concern The Cat in the Hat's son, "great great great great grandfather", and daughter, respectively. The book's illustrations are notable for their use of gouache and brush strokes, rather than Seuss' usual pen and ink.

The title story concerns The Cat in the Hat's son, who brags that he can fight 30 tigers and win. He makes excuse after excuse, finally disqualifying all tigers but one until he must fight only one tiger. The second story, "King Looie Katz", concerns The Cat's ancestor, and is a warning against hierarchical society advocating self-reliance. The final story, "The Glunk That Got Thunk", concerns The Cat's daughter and the power of run-away imagination.

== Stories ==
=== I Can Lick 30 Tigers Today! ===
The Cat in the Hat's son goes outside bragging to himself that he can fight thirty tigers and win. Upon hearing this, thirty tigers step forward to call his bluff, but seeing that he's outnumbered and outsized, the Cat's son begins making up excuses to reduce the number of tigers for various reasons (one having curly hair, nine having dirty fingernails, five being underweight, five looking sleepy, and two looking hot) with the exception of seven being dismissed without any reason. With the number now reduced to just one tiger, the Cat's son instead decides to back out of the would be fight with the excuse that lunchtime has come up.

=== King Looie Katz ===
In the year 139, the Cat in the Hat's great-great-great-great grandfather Looie is the King of Katzen-stein. King Looie is very proud of his tail and prefers that it never drag behind him, so he has it cleaned in the morning and arranges for Fooie Katz to be his helper and hold up his tail to prevent it from dragging. However, when Fooie sees that his own tail is dragging, he decides that what's good enough for the king is good enough for him too, so he hires Kooie Katz to hold up his tail.

The process, however, ends up repeating itself until all the cats in Katzen-stein are holding up each other's tails except for Zooie Katzen-bein, who is now the only cat without anybody to hold up his own tail. Finally fed up with being the only cat to have his tail dragging, Zooie slams down Prooie Katz's tail in frustration, which makes the other cats do the same thing until Fooie slams down King Looie's tail. From that day on, King Looie and all the other cats act "demo-catic" by holding up their own tails themselves.

=== The Glunk That Got Thunk ===
The Cat in the Hat's daughter engages in an after-dinner hobby of sitting in her room to use her "Thinker-Upper" to think up friendly little furry things and use her "UN-Thinker" to "un-think" them away when she's done. One evening, while thinking up friendly little furry things as usual, the Cat's daughter decides that she can think up bigger things, but in increasing her Thinker-Upper's power, it ends up creating a Glunk, a big green furry creature, that breaks out of her dream cloud. Seeing what she's done, the Cat's daughter tries to Un-Think the Glunk away, but the Glunk doesn't go away, to which he explains that Glunks can't be "Un-Thunked" once they've been "thunked" up.

To the Cat's daughter's dismay, the Glunk then proceeds to the living room to use the telephone to make a 9,000 mile long distance call to his mother (something he does every night, not even caring how expensive the phone bill gets). Despite the Cat's daughter's warning that the telephone company charges an expensive fee for long distance calls, the Glunk calls up his mother and talks nonstop about "Glunker" Stew, a recipe he just cooked up that day. The Cat's daughter's attempts to get the Glunk off the phone are only met with scoffing and a kick in the shin, leaving her to become more and more desperate to get rid of him when the Glunk has talked up to $300 for two whole hours.

Hearing the racket, the Cat's son comes into the living room to find the Glunk still blabbering into the phone and his little sister trying again at trying to Un-Think the Glunk, so far without success. Seeing that she needs help, the Cat's son turns on his UN-Thinker as well and, together, both of them successfully Un-Think the Glunk away (revealing that the Glunk's earlier explanation to the Cat's daughter never revealed that Glunks can only be Un-Thunked away if more than one person is doing it). After that, the Cat's son gives his little sister a very stern lecture about proper use of her Thinker-Upper and from that night on, the Cat's daughter sticks to using her Thinker-Upper to only thinking up friendly little furry things.

== See also ==
- The Cat in the Hat, original 1957 book
