= Helen Palmer (writer) =

American writer (1898–1967)

Helen Palmer Geisel
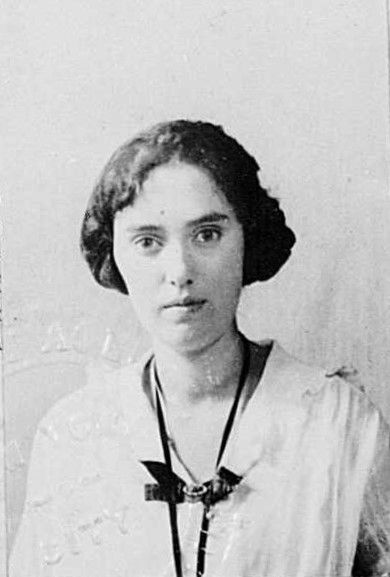
- Palmer in 1924
- Born: Helen Marion Palmer; September 16, 1898; Brooklyn, New York, U.S.
- Died: October 23, 1967 (aged 69); La Jolla, California, U.S.
- Education: Wellesley College
- Occupations: Children's book author, editor, screenwriter, Founder and Vice President of Beginner Books
- Spouse: Theodor Seuss Geisel (m. 1927)
- Writing career
- Pen name: Helen Palmer
- Genre: Children's literature
- Notable works: A Fish Out of Water; I Was Kissed by a Seal at the Zoo; Do You Know What I'm Going to Do Next Saturday?; Why I Built the Boogle House

Helen Marion Palmer Geisel (September 16, 1898 – October 23, 1967), known professionally as Helen Palmer, was an American children's writer, editor, and philanthropist. She was a co-founder and vice president of Beginner Books, and was married to fellow writer Theodor Seuss Geisel, better known as Dr. Seuss, from 1927 until her death. Her best-known books include Do You Know What I'm Going to Do Next Saturday?, I Was Kissed by a Seal at the Zoo, Why I Built the Boogle House, and A Fish Out of Water. She died by suicide on October 23, 1967.

== Life ==
=== Early life and college ===
Helen Palmer was born in New York City in 1898 and spent her childhood in Bedford–Stuyvesant, a prosperous Brooklyn neighborhood. As a child, she contracted polio, but recovered from it almost completely. Her father, George Howard Palmer, an ophthalmologist, died when she was 11.

She graduated from Wellesley College with honors in 1920. She then spent three years teaching English at Girls High School in Brooklyn before moving with her mother to England to attend Oxford University.

She met her future husband, Ted Geisel, in class at Oxford. She had a profound influence on his life, starting with her suggestion that he should be an artist rather than an English professor. She later stated, "Ted's notebooks were always filled with these fabulous animals. So I set to work diverting him; here was a man who could draw such pictures; he should be earning a living doing that." They married in 1927. She could not have children because of medical conditions.

=== Postwar ===
Following World War II, she worked in Hollywood with her husband. The two shared the writing credit on Design for Death, which won the 1947 Academy Award for Best Documentary Feature.

For the next decade, she was the primary source of encouragement for and was an editor of her husband's prolific books for children, even as her health worsened. She was an uncredited author for many of her husband's products.

=== Beginner Books ===
Palmer, along with husband Theodor Geisel, and Phyllis Cerf, wife of Bennett Cerf, co-founded Beginner Books in 1958, following the smash success of The Cat in the Hat by Dr. Seuss in 1957. Geisel served as President and Palmer as Vice President. Palmer contributed four of her own books to the imprint: A Fish Out of Water, I Was Kissed by A Seal at the Zoo, Do You Know What I'm Going to Do Next Saturday?, and Why I Built the Boogle House.

=== Illness and suicide ===
Palmer died by suicide with an overdose of barbiturates on October 23, 1967, after a series of illnesses spanning 13 years. She wrote in her suicide note:

Dear Ted, What has happened to us? I don't know. I feel myself in a spiral, going down down down, into a black hole from which there is no escape, no brightness. And loud in my ears from every side I hear, "failure, failure, failure..." I love you so much ... I am too old and enmeshed in everything you do and are, that I cannot conceive of life without you ... My going will leave quite a rumor but you can say I was overworked and overwrought. Your reputation with your friends and fans will not be harmed ... Sometimes, think of the fun we had all thru the years ...

Eight months later, in August 1968, Seuss married Audrey Dimond, with whom he had been having an affair.

== Works ==
Helen Palmer's best-known book is Do You Know What I'm Going To Do Next Saturday?, published in 1963. This book combined Palmer's stories with photographs by Lynn Fayman, as did two other books: I Was Kissed by a Seal at the Zoo (1962) and Why I Built the Boogle House (1964). The photographs in I Was Kissed by a Seal at the Zoo were taken at the San Diego Zoo in Balboa Park, San Diego, California, and featured children from the Francis Parker School in San Diego interacting with the zoo's animals and staff.

She also expanded the Dr. Seuss short story "Gustav the Goldfish," originally published in Redbook, into the book A Fish Out of Water (1961), which was illustrated by P. D. Eastman. In 2012, A Fish Out of Water was included in the Beginner Books anthology The Big Purple Book of Beginner Books.

== See also ==
- Childhood in literature
- List of children's book series
- List of children's classic books
- List of children's literature authors
- List of publishers of children's books
