= Picture book =

Book with images at least as important as words

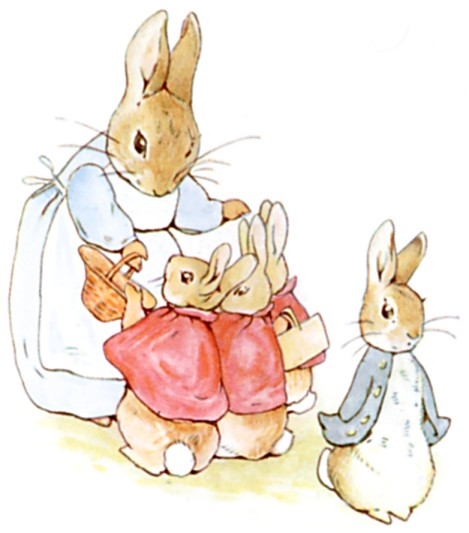
Peter Rabbit with his family, from The Tale of Peter Rabbit by Beatrix Potter, 1902

A picture book combines visual and verbal narratives in a book format, most often aimed at young children. With the narrative told primarily through text, they are distinct from comics, which do so primarily through sequential images.

The images in picture books can be produced in a range of media, such as oil paints, acrylics, watercolor, and pencil. Picture books often serve as educational resources, aiding with children's language development or understanding of the world.

Three of the earliest works in the format of modern picture books are Heinrich Hoffmann's Struwwelpeter from 1845, Benjamin Rabier's Tintin-Lutin from 1898 and Beatrix Potter's The Tale of Peter Rabbit from 1902. Some of the best-known picture books are Robert McCloskey's Make Way for Ducklings, Dr. Seuss's The Cat in the Hat, and Maurice Sendak's Where the Wild Things Are. The Caldecott Medal (established 1938) is awarded annually for the best American picture book. Since the mid-1960s, several children's literature awards have included a category for picture books.

== Target audiences ==
Picture books are most often aimed at young children. Many are written with vocabulary a child can understand but not necessarily read. For this reason, picture books tend to have two functions in the lives of children: they are first read to young children by adults, and then children read them themselves once they begin learning to read.

== Categories ==
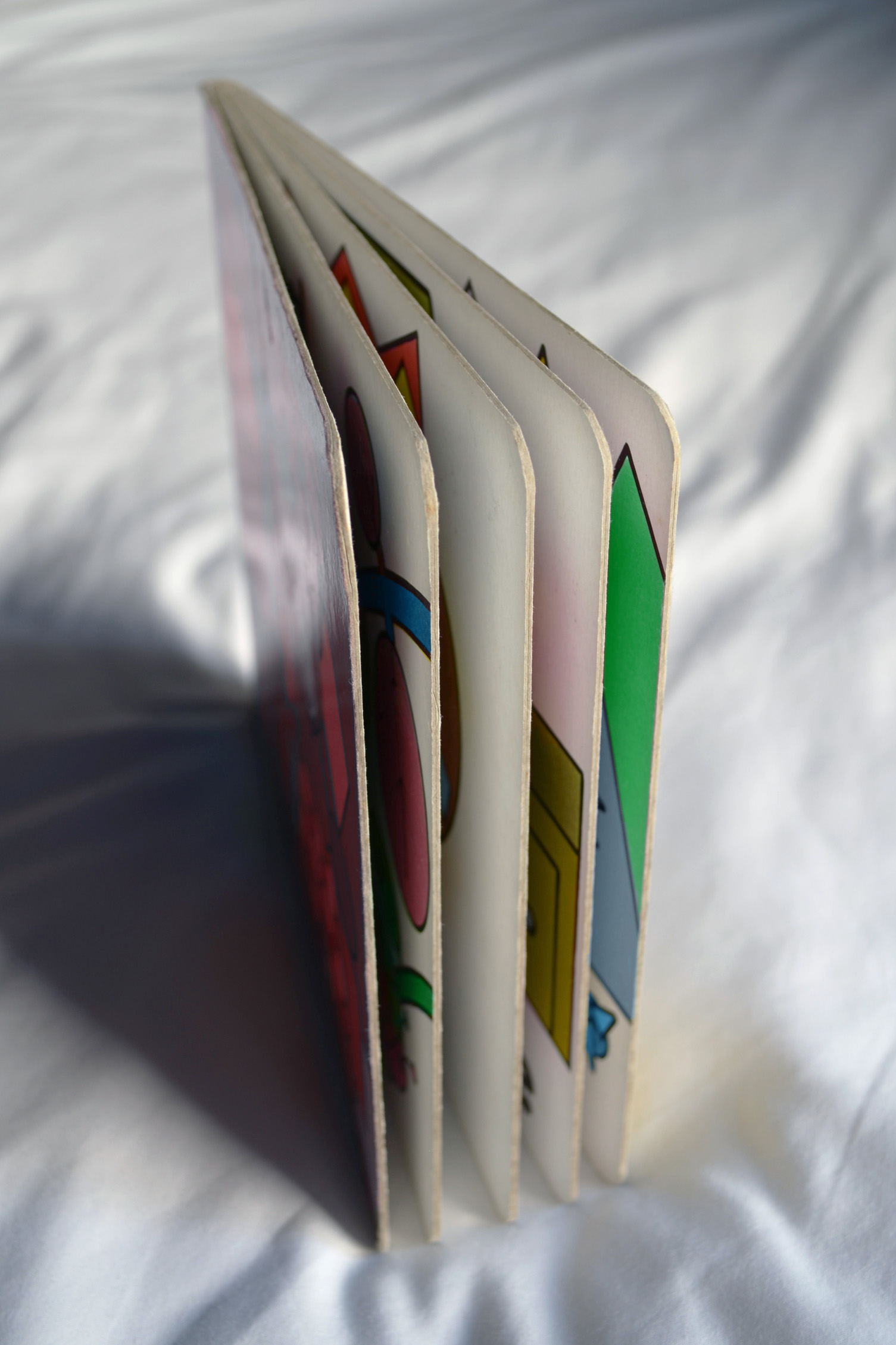
A board book

The majority of picture books are constructed in the same way as books for older children and adults, but there are a number of special types.

- Board books are picture books printed on sturdy cardboard—called paperboard—for young children who tend to be less careful with traditional books. Paperboard is used for both the cover and the interior pages. The pages are specially folded and bound together.
- Soft books, also aimed at very young children, are made of cloth or soft plastic.
- Pop-up books employ paper engineering to make parts of the page pop up or stand up when pages are opened. The Wheels on the Bus, by Paul O. Zelinsky, is an example of a best-selling pop-up book.
- Touch and feel books included textured surfaces in the pictures. Pat the Bunny, by Dorothy Kunhardt, is a popular touch and feel book.
- Concept books teach children about specific themes such as the alphabet or shapes. A famous example is A Is for Apple by Georgie Birkett.
- Easy reader books are for children who are beginning to learn how to read and include simple text and descriptive illustrations.
- Non-fiction children's books are used to teach children in a simple and accessible way.
- Wordless picture books tell a story only through images. They encourage creativity and can be appreciated by children who cannot yet read. A famous example of a wordless picture book is The Snowman by Raymond Briggs.

== Genre ==
The genre of picture books is unique because of the complementary relationship between text and art. Picture books have existed since 1658, when the first picture book specifically for children, Orbis Sensualium Pictus, was printed. The genre continues to be popular today. While some picture books are written and illustrated by the same person, others are collaborations between an author and an illustrator. These collaborations give equal power to both and allow each to bring their own creativity to the book. Children's book illustrations can drive the plot or bring the plot to life. Editors of picture books often look carefully for an illustrator that matches the style of the text, while still adding their own artistic value to the book. There must be mutual respect between an author and an illustrator in the creation of a successful picture book.

== Pedagogy ==
Picture books can serve as important learning tools for young children. They are often used both in the classroom and at home to help children develop language and creativity skills. A psychology study showed that wordless picture books have been shown to improve children's storytelling skills and boost their engagement in books. Additionally, children's picture books can help children tackle philosophical questions and life concepts. For example, Mac Barnett and Carson Ellis's picture book What is Love? serves not only as entertainment for children, but as an introduction to important life questions about love and empathy. A study in Australia found that reading postmodern picture books led to better text analysis skills for students. Picture books can also improve young children's descriptive vocabulary and reading and drawing behaviors at home. The art element of picture books aids with creativity development and engagement with books. Not only can picture books help children develop literacy and creative skills, but they can also help children develop logical thinking and mathematical skills. Math-based stories can help children conceptualize mathematical concepts and develop language skills to discuss math.

== History ==
=== Early illustrated books ===
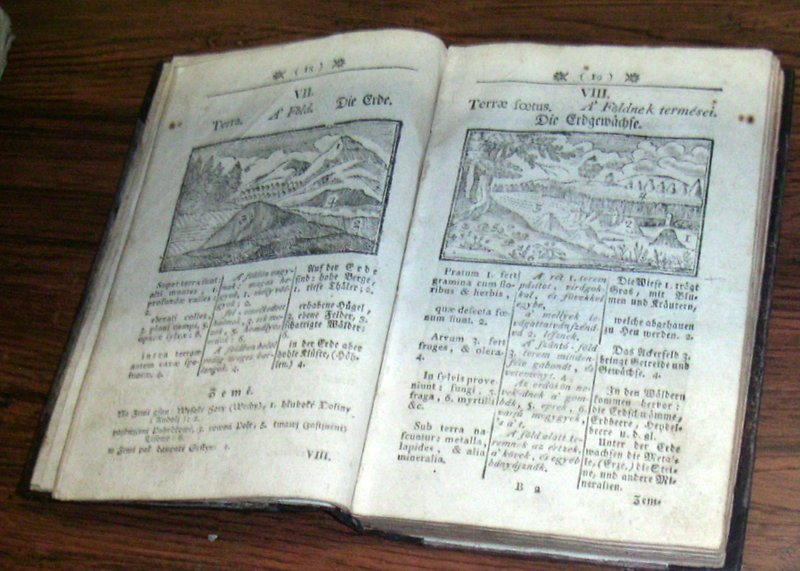
A reprint of the 1658 illustrated Orbis Pictus

The production of illustrated books dates back to the earliest days of bookbinding. Medieval illuminated manuscripts were commissioned by the rich, and drawn by religious scribes. Perhaps the most important tradition of medieval art in regard to the development of picture books is the Poor Man's Bible, which sought to make illustrations of important Biblical events so that they could be understood by the illiterate. These illustrations were generally found either on stained glass windows, or as illuminations in Paupers' Bibles.

Orbis Pictus from 1658 by John Amos Comenius was the earliest illustrated book specifically for children. It is something of a children's encyclopedia and is illustrated by woodcuts. A Little Pretty Pocket-Book from 1744 by John Newbery was the earliest illustrated storybook marketed as pleasure reading in English. In Japan, kibyoshi were picture books from the 18th century, and are seen as a precursor to manga. Examples of 18th-century Japanese picture books include works such as Santō Kyōden's Shiji no yukikai (1798).

The German children's books Struwwelpeter (literally "Shaggy-Peter") from 1845 by Heinrich Hoffmann, and Max and Moritz from 1865 by Wilhelm Busch, were among the earliest examples of modern picturebook design. Collections of Fairy tales from the early nineteenth century, like those by the Brothers Grimm or Hans Christian Andersen were sparsely illustrated, but beginning in the middle of the century, collections were published with images by illustrators like Gustave Doré, Fedor Flinzer, George Cruikshank, Vilhelm Pedersen, Ivan Bilibin and John Bauer. Andrew Lang's twelve Fairy Books published between 1889 and 1910 were illustrated by among others Henry J. Ford and Lancelot Speed. Lewis Carroll's Alice's Adventures in Wonderland, illustrated by John Tenniel in 1866 was one of the first highly successful entertainment books for children.

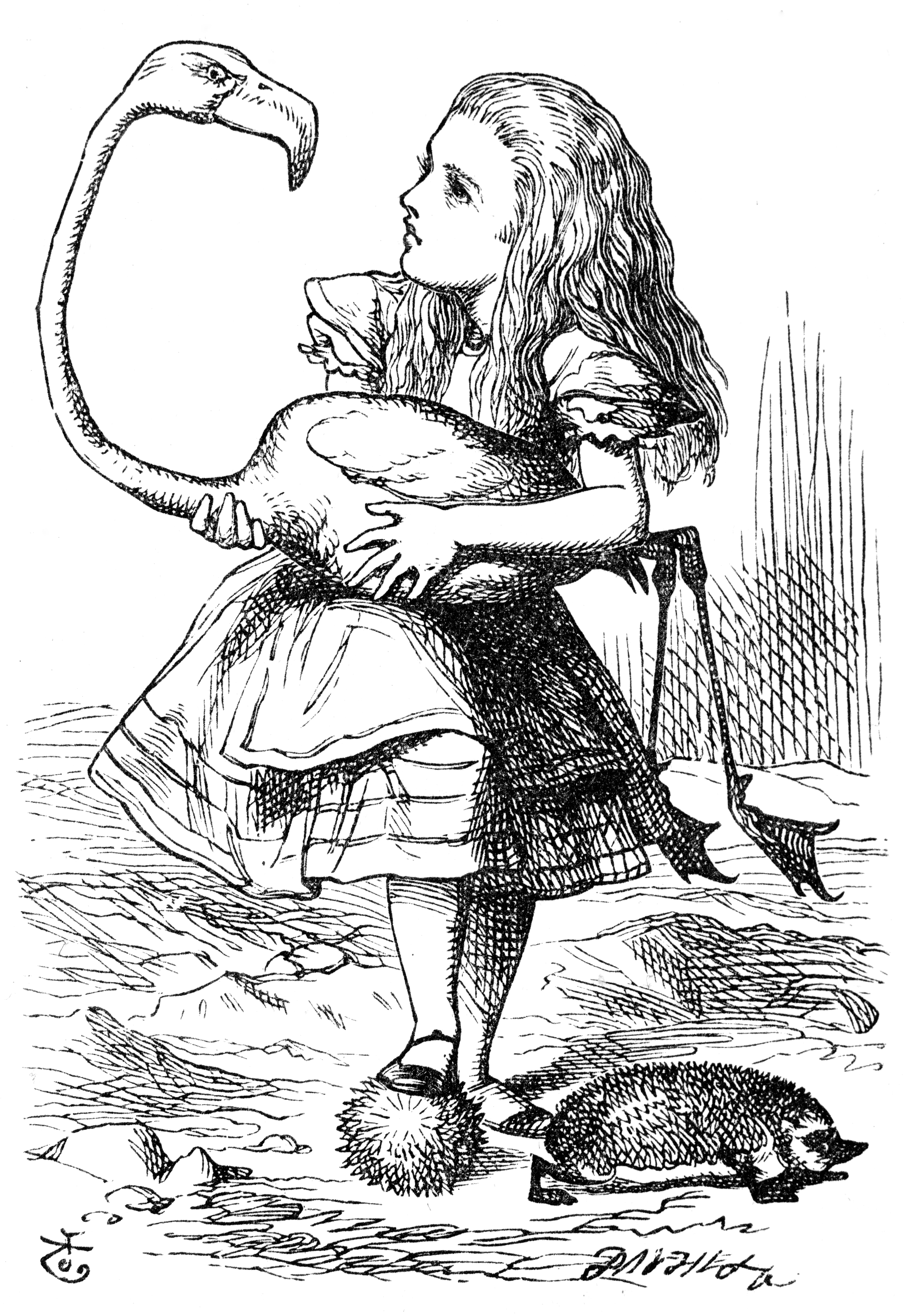
Alice from Lewis Carroll's Alice's Adventures in Wonderland, illustration by John Tenniel, 1866

Toy books were introduced in the latter half of the 19th century, small paper-bound books with art dominating the text. These had a larger proportion of pictures to words than earlier books, and many of their pictures were in color. The best of these were illustrated by the triumvirate of English illustrators Randolph Caldecott, Walter Crane, and Kate Greenaway whose association with colour printer and wood engraver Edmund Evans produced books of great quality. In the late 19th and early 20th century a small number of American and British artists made their living illustrating children's books, like Rose O'Neill, Arthur Rackham, Cicely Mary Barker, Willy Pogany, Edmund Dulac, W. Heath Robinson, Howard Pyle, or Charles Robinson.

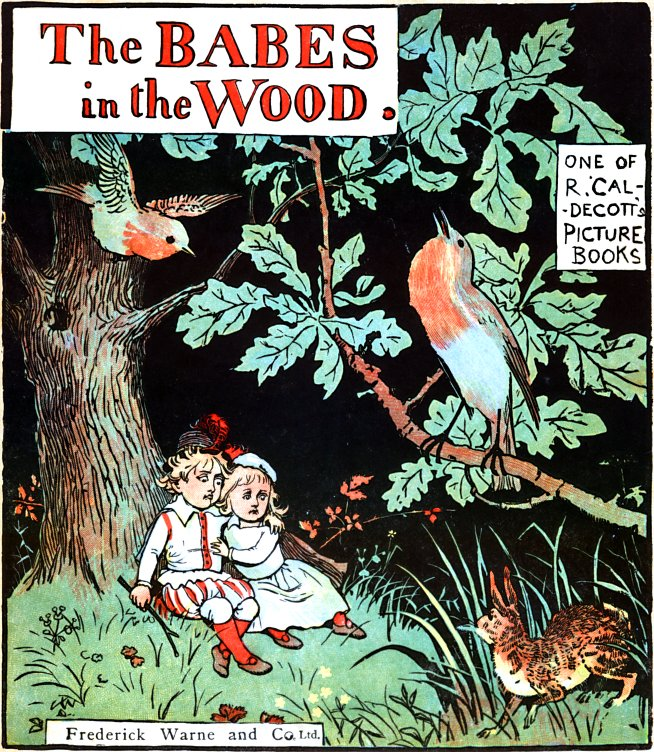
Cover of Babes in the Wood (1879), illustrated by Randolph Caldecott

Beatrix Potter's The Tale of Peter Rabbit was published in 1902 to immediate success. Peter Rabbit was Potter's first of many The Tale of..., including The Tale of Squirrel Nutkin, The Tale of Benjamin Bunny, The Tale of Tom Kitten, and The Tale of Jemima Puddle-Duck, to name but a few which were published in the years leading up to 1910. Swedish author Elsa Beskow wrote and illustrated some forty children's stories and picture books between 1897–1952. Lang's twelve Fairy Books published between 1889 and 1910 were illustrated by among others Henry J. Ford and Lancelot Speed.

In the US, illustrated stories for children appeared in magazines like Ladies Home Journal, Good Housekeeping, Cosmopolitan, and Woman's Home Companion, intended for mothers to read to their children. Some cheap periodicals appealing to the juvenile reader started to appear in the early twentieth century, often with uncredited illustrations.

Helen Bannerman's Little Black Sambo was published in 1899, and went through numerous printings and versions during the first decade of the twentieth century. It was part of a series of small-format books called The Dumpy Books for Children, published by British publisher Grant Richards between 1897 and 1904.

=== Early to mid-20th century ===
In 1913, Cupples & Leon published a series of 15 All About books, emulating the form and size of the Beatrix Potter books, All About Peter Rabbit, All About the Three Bears, All About Mother Goose, and All About Little Red Hen. The latter, along with several others, was illustrated by Johnny Gruelle. Wanda Gág's Millions of Cats was published in 1928 and became the first picture book to receive a Newbery Medal runner-up award. Wanda Gág followed with The Funny Thing in 1929, Snippy and Snappy in 1931, and then The ABC Bunny in 1933, which garnered her a second Newbery runner-up award.

In 1931, Jean de Brunhoff's first Babar book, The Story of Babar was published in France, followed by The Travels of Babar then Babar the King. In 1930, Marjorie Flack authored and illustrated Angus and the Ducks, followed in 1931 by Angus and The Cats, then in 1932, Angus Lost. Flack authored another book in 1933, The Story About Ping, illustrated by Kurt Wiese. The Elson Basic Reader was published in 1930 and introduced the public to Dick and Jane. In 1930 The Little Engine That Could was published, illustrated by Lois Lenski. In 1954 it was illustrated anew by George and Doris Hauman. It spawned an entire line of books and related paraphernalia and coined the refrain "I think I can! I think I can!". In 1936, Munro Leaf's The Story of Ferdinand was published, illustrated by Robert Lawson. Ferdinand was the first picture book to cross over into pop culture. Walt Disney produced an animated feature film along with corresponding merchandising materials. In 1938 to Dorothy Lathrop was awarded the first Caldecott Medal for her illustrations in Animals of the Bible, written by Helen Dean Fish. Thomas Handforth won the second Caldecott Medal in 1939, for Mei Li, which he also wrote. Ludwig Bemelmans' Madeline was published in 1939 and was selected as a Caldecott Medal runner-up, today known as a Caldecott Honor book.

In 1942, Simon & Schuster began publishing the Little Golden Books, a series of inexpensive, well illustrated, high quality children's books. The eighth book in the series, The Poky Little Puppy, is the top selling children's book of all time. Many of the books were bestsellers, including The Poky Little Puppy, Tootle, Scuffy the Tugboat, and The Little Red Hen. Several illustrators for the Little Golden Books later became staples within the picture book industry. Corinne Malvern, Tibor Gergely, Gustaf Tenggren, Feodor Rojankovsky, Richard Scarry, Eloise Wilkin, and Garth Williams. In 1947 Goodnight Moon, written by Margaret Wise Brown and illustrated by Clement Hurd, was published. By 1955, such picture book classics as Make Way for Ducklings, The Little House, Curious George, and Eloise, had all been published. In 1955 the first book was published in the Miffy series by Dutch author and illustrator Dick Bruna.

In 1937, Dr. Seuss (Theodor Seuss Geisel), at the time a successful graphic artist and humorist, published his first book for children, And to Think That I Saw It on Mulberry Street. It was immediately successful, and Seuss followed up with The 500 Hats of Bartholomew Cubbins in 1938, followed by The King's Stilts in 1939, and Horton Hatches the Egg in 1940, all published by Random House. From 1947 to 1956 Seuss had twelve children's picture books published. Dr. Seuss created The Cat in the Hat in reaction to a Life magazine article by John Hersey in lamenting the unrealistic children in school primers books. Seuss rigidly limited himself to a small set of words from an elementary school vocabulary list, then crafted a story based upon two randomly selected words—cat and hat. Up until the mid-1950s, there was a degree of separation between illustrated educational books and illustrated picture books. That changed with The Cat in the Hat in 1957.

Because of the success of The Cat in The Hat an independent publishing company was formed, called Beginner Books. The second book in the series was nearly as popular, The Cat in the Hat Comes Back, published in 1958. Other books in the series were Sam and the Firefly (1958), Green Eggs and Ham (1960), Are You My Mother? (1960), Go, Dog. Go! (1961), Hop on Pop (1963), and Fox in Socks (1965). Creators in the Beginner Book series were Stan and Jan Berenstain, P. D. Eastman, Roy McKie, and Helen Palmer Geisel (Seuss's wife). The Beginner Books dominated the children's picture book market of the 1960s.

Between 1957 and 1960 Harper & Brothers published a series of sixteen "I Can Read" books. Little Bear was the first of the series. Written by Else Holmelund Minarik and illustrated by a then relatively unknown Maurice Sendak, the two collaborated on three other "I Can Read" books over the next three years. From 1958 to 1960, Syd Hoff wrote and illustrated four "I Can Read" books: Danny and the Dinosaur, Sammy the Seal, Julius, and Oliver.

=== Mid- to late 20th century ===
In 1949 American writer and illustrator Richard Scarry began his career working on the Little Golden Books series. His Best Word Book Ever from 1963 has sold 4 million copies. In total Scarry wrote and illustrated more than 250 books, and more than 100 million of his books have been sold worldwide. In 1963, Where the Wild Things Are by American writer and illustrator Maurice Sendak was published. It has been adapted into other media several times, including an animated short in 1973, a 1980 opera, and, in 2009, a live-action feature film adaptation directed by Spike Jonze. By 2008 it had sold over 19 million copies worldwide. American illustrator and author Gyo Fujikawa created more than 50 books between 1963 and 1990. Her work has been translated into 17 languages and published in 22 countries. Her most popular books, Babies and Baby Animals, have sold over 1.7 million copies in the U.S. Fujikawa is recognized for being the earliest mainstream illustrator of picture books to include children of many races in her work.

Most of the Moomin books by Finnish author Tove Jansson were novels, but several Moomin picture books were also published between 1952 and 1980, like Who Will Comfort Toffle? (1960) and The Dangerous Journey (1977). The Barbapapa series of books by Annette Tison and Talus Taylor was published in France in the 1970s. They feature the shapeshifting pink blob Barbapapa and his numerous colorful children. The Mr. Men series of 40-some books by English author and illustrated Roger Hargreaves started in 1971. The Snowman by Raymond Briggs was published in Britain in 1978 and was entirely wordless. It was made into an Oscar nominated animated cartoon that has been shown every year since on British television.

Japanese author and illustrator Mitsumasa Anno has published a number of picture books, beginning in 1968 with Mysterious Pictures. In his "Journey" books a tiny character travels through depictions of the culture of various countries. Everyone Poops was first published in Japan in 1977, written and illustrated by the prolific children's author Tarō Gomi. It has been translated into several languages. Published in 1978, Roald Dahl's The Enormous Crocodile is in the style of a picture book in contrast to his other children's books. Australian author Margaret Wild has written more than 40 books since 1984 and won several awards. In 1987 the first book was published in the Where's Wally? (known as Where's Waldo? in the United States and Canada) series by the British illustrator Martin Handford. The books were translated into many languages and the franchise also spawned a TV series, a comic strip and a series of video games. Since 1989 over 32 books have been created in the Elmer the Patchwork Elephant series by the British author David McKee. They have been translated in 60 languages, sold over 12 million copies worldwide, launched a merchandise and licensing range, and adapted into a children's TV series.

== Technology and children's books ==
With the rapid technological changes, children have more options in the reading format. Print books are no longer the only choice; many are now available in digital versions. The usage of digital devices is increasing in the home and the school setting. Comparing digital and traditional printed books has become a popular topic. The University of California has conducted a study and revealed the differences in book format and how they impact children's learning.

Children who participated in this study were randomly assigned to read the same book in different formats: eBook or Print book. Reading experiences and outcomes were then accessed. The study found that children are more visually sustained with eBooks but less likely to recall the story sequence. However, there were no differences in behavioural engagement. There is a slight difference in remembering the story. Children remember the story a lot more when a person reads it than on a tablet. In conclusion of this study, children have equally attentive, vocal, and emotional engagement on both platforms. They remember more about the story sequence when reading a print book. Comparably, children talk about the device more when reading on a tablet, regardless of previous experience with digital reading.

This study shows some differences when children read on a different platforms. However, the format differences do not heavily impact children's reading experience when the contents are the same.

== Picture book design ==
=== Interactive design in print picture books ===
There are many ways to design interactive elements in picture books; it could involve how children flip the pages, how the information is revealed, and the placement of sensory elements like touch and smell. The study conducted by Liying Wang from Tongji University analyzed preschool children on book interaction design. It collects participants' emotional responses when interacting with six interactive elements: regular page flipping, open/close, rotates, touch and smell, pull/push, and puzzle. The study found that preschool children were quickly experiencing positive emotions when interacting with exciting forms. The most popular interaction forms are "touch & pull," "puzzle," and "pull/push." Moreover, there are no significant gender differences in the interest in interaction forms. Based on their findings, this study made the following recommendations for children's book interaction design: First the study recommended creating suitable interaction elements to stimulate children's positive emotions in reading. It will enhance engagement and positively affect the reading experience. Secondly, designers must pay attention to sensory experience in interactive design because it would mobilize reading initiative and increase concentration. Lastly, the interaction form should match the children's cognitive characteristics, in which the elements should help narrative and reasoning.

=== Interactive design in digital picture books ===
With the popularity of digital devices, children have more access to digital reading. Many studies analyze the impacts of digital books compared to traditional books, and the finding turns positive and negative depending on the variables. One of the studies shows that digital books could benefit children's reading outcomes if the design of digital enhancement aligns with the story content. However, if the digital enhancement is unrelated to the narrative, like games, it will negatively impact children's attention from reading, leading to poor comprehension.

Recent research from the University of Stavanger presents many useful findings for designers regarding digital children's book design. Rather than weigh the advantages and disadvantages of digital children's books, it was focused on book design enhancements that could be optimized to increase children's learning. The most significant finding from this research supports previous studies on book design enhancement. Children benefit in meaning-making when the enhancement is designed to align with the story, like providing background knowledge of the story event. In contrast, children will be distracted if the design enhancement does not support the storyline, as with the pop-up dictionary emended in the story.

== Awards ==
In 1938, the American Library Association (ALA) began presenting the Caldecott Medal for the most distinguished American picture book published in the year, awarded to the book's illustrator. The Caldecott Medal was established as a sister award to the ALA's Newbery Medal, which since 1922 has been awarded to the most distinguished American children's book published in the year. During the mid-forties to early fifties, Caldecott honorees included Marcia Brown, Barbara Cooney, Roger Duvoisin, Berta and Elmer Hader, Robert Lawson, Robert McCloskey, Dr. Seuss, Maurice Sendak, Ingri and Edgar Parin d'Aulaire, Leo Politi, Tasha Tudor, and Leonard Weisgard.

The Kate Greenaway Medal was established in the United Kingdom in 1955 in honour of the children's illustrator, Kate Greenaway. The medal is given annually to an outstanding work of illustration in children's literature (not necessarily in a picture book). It is awarded by Chartered Institute of Library and Information Professionals (CILIP). The Deutscher Jugendliteraturpreis (German Youth literature prize) has included a category for picture books since 1965. The IBBY Hans Christian Andersen Award for Illustration has been awarded since 1966. The Boston Globe-Horn Book Award, first presented in 1967, includes a category for picture books.

In 2006, the ALA started awarding the Geisel Award, named after Dr. Seuss, to the most distinguished beginning reader book. The award is presented to both the author and illustrator, in "literary and artistic achievements to engage children in reading." The Golden Pinwheel Young Illustrators Award was established in China in 2015. It includes an award for Chinese works and an international award.

== Sources ==
- Hunt, Peter; Sheila Ray (1996). International Companion Encyclopedia of Children's Literature. London: Routledge. p. 465. ISBN 0-203-16812-7.
- Kiefer, Barbara Z. (2010). Charlotte Huck's Children's Literature.New York, McGraw-Hill. ISBN 978-0-07-337856-5
- Ray, Gordon Norton (1991). The Illustrator and the book in England from 1790 to 1914. New York: Dover. ISBN 0-486-26955-8.
- Zielinski, Linda & Stan; "Children's Picture book Price Guide", Chap. 1: Today's Golden Era Of Picture books; Flying Moose Books; 2006. ISBN 0-9779394-0-5
