= Barbapapa: One Big Happy Family! =

- Also known as: Barbapapa en famille ! (French) (Note: In both French and English, the title card onscreen drops the subtitle and refers to the series simply as "Barbapapa" in the second season.)
- Genre: Preschool education; Comedy; Adventure; Musical (season 2)
- Based on: Barbapapa by Annette Tison and Talus Taylor
- Developed by: Annette Tison; Talus Taylor
- Written by: Alice Taylor; Thomas Taylor; Teddy Jacquier (writing consultant)
- Directed by: Alice Taylor; Thomas Taylor
- Voices of: Bernard Alane; Lucille Boudonnat; Kaycie Chase; Adeline Chetail; Marie Facundo; Emmylou Homs; Nathalie Karsenti; Fily Keita; Bruno Magnes; Youna Noiret
- Narrated by: Bernard Alane (some episodes)
- Opening theme: "La famille du Barbapapa"
- Country of origin: France
- Original language: French
- No. of seasons: 2
- No. of episodes: 104

Production
- Executive producers: Alice Taylor; Thomas Taylor
- Producers: Alice Taylor; Thomas Taylor
- Animator: Normaal Animation
- Editor: Tim Taylor
- Running time: 11 minutes
- Production company: Normaal Animation

Original release
- Network: TF1 (France); RTS 1 (Switzerland)
- Release: 10 November 2019 – 9 June 2024

Related
- Barbapapa

Barbapapa: One Big Happy Family! (French: Barbapapa en famille !, lit. "Barbapapa with family!") is a French musical (Note: In season 2, the series becomes a musical, with at least one song being featured in half of the episodes. While it did have the occasional song in the season prior, they weren't as prevalent as they appear in the second season.) animated children's television series. The series serves as a reboot of the original Barbapapa television series based on the books of the same name by French-American couple Annette Tison and Talus Taylor. The series is a production of Normaal Animation, with the participation of TF1, Nickelodeon, Télé-Québec and RTS.

The show was first announced in 2018 via a Nickelodeon press release, and began broadcasting in its native France beginning November 10, 2019 on TF1, as part of the TFOU programming block for children. On June 9, 2021, a compilation film consisting of previous episodes called Les Barbapapa se mettent au vert ("The Barbapapas Go Green") was released in French theaters. The second season premiered on November 5, 2023.

It deviates from the original series and its sequel, Barbapapa Around the World's five-minute episode format by extending the length of each episode to eleven minutes, which allows for more involved episode plots with more storytelling.

== Premise ==
Barbapapa: One Big Happy Family! focuses on the daily lives of the members of the Barbapapa family (Barbapapa, Barbamama, and their seven children; Barbabravo, Barbalib, Barbazoo, Barbalala, Barbabright, Barbabelle and Barbabeau), a group of shapeshifting blobs. Most of the episodes involve the family getting themselves into extraordinary and often humorous situations, such as building a rocket to Mars or the children trying to hide a pet elephant they found in the wild from their parents.

Each episode features a teachable moral that the characters learn from while on their adventures.

== Cast ==
=== Original French dub ===
- Bruno Magnes — Barbapapa
- Nathalie Karsenti — Barbamama
- Lucille Boudonnat — Barbalib
- Adeline Chetail — Barbabelle
- Youna Noiret — Barbabravo
- Fily Keita — Barbabright
- Kaycie Chase — Barbazoo
- Marie Facundo — Barbabeau
- Emmylou Homs — Barbalala
- Bernard Alane — Narrator, Mr. Strict, others
- Jérémy Prévost — Roy
- Nathalie Homs
- Fred Colas
- Nicolas Justamon

=== English dub ===
Unlike the original French version, which uses adult voice actresses for the voices of the Barbababies, child actors perform their voices. The dub was produced in the United Kingdom by Jungle Studios in British English.

- Barbapapa (voiced by Oliver Britten) – A pink shapeshifting blob-shaped creature who is the father of the Barbababies.
- Barbamama (voiced by Harriet Carmichael) — A black shapeshifting blob-shaped creature who is the mother of the Barbababies.
- Barbalib (voiced by Scarlett Keeble) — An orange Barbababie who loves to read books and is very smart.
- Barbabelle (voiced by Molly O'Mahony) — A purple Barbababie who loves fashion.
- Barbabravo (voiced by Felix Warren (season 1), Brodie Edwards (season 2)) — A red Barbababie who is a sports fan and loves to keep fit.
- Barbabright (voiced by William Barber (season 1), Charlie McGonagle (season 2)) — A blue Barbababie who loves science and coming up with new inventions.
- Barbazoo (voiced by Teddy West (season 1), Zane Siddiqui (season 2)) — A yellow Barbababie who is a nature enthusiast and enjoys taking care of animals.
- Barbabeau (voiced by Bruno Ben Tovim (season 1), Max Lester (season 2)) — A black and furry Barbababie who loves art, including drawing and painting.
- Barbalala (voiced by Ynez Williams) — A green Barbababie who is a musician and loves to play various instruments.

The voice actor for Barbabravo was omitted in error from the credits in the original release of the English dub. The voice actor for the narrator (whose voice is also changed in season 2) is uncredited.

== Episodes ==
=== Series overview ===
Season	Episodes	Originally released	
Season	Episodes	First released	Last released
1	52	November 10, 2019	December 2, 2020
2	52	November 5, 2023	January 11, 2025

=== Season 1 (2019–20) ===
No. overall	No. in season	English translated title Original French title	Directed by	Written by	Original release date	English air date	Prod. code
1	1	"Barbabravo Is Not Feeling Well" "Barbidur n'est pas en forme"	Alice and Thomas Taylor	Alice and Thomas Taylor	August 31, 2020	April 25, 2021	125A
Following a misadventure, Barbabravo is unable to transform at all. The whole family unites to help him.
2	2	"Making Bread" "De la graine au pain"	Alice and Thomas Taylor	Alice and Thomas Taylor	November 17, 2019	November 8, 2020	104A
Barbapapa wants to teach his children to make bread, but things don't go as planned...
3	3	"The Great Spring Clean" "Le grand nettoyage de printemps"	Alice and Thomas Taylor	Alice and Thomas Taylor	March 22, 2020	December 6, 2020	109B
Barbamama wants the barbababies to tidy their bedrooms. They're hiding to escape the drudgery.
4	4	"Be Patient Barbabravo..." "Patience Barbidur..."	Alice and Thomas Taylor	Alice and Thomas Taylor	September 1, 2020	April 25, 2021	125B
Barbabravo can't stay put and is unable to focus one an activity for very long. Barbalala offers to teach him control. Will she succeed?
5	5	"Bada-Bam" "Bababam"	Alice and Thomas Taylor	Alice and Thomas Taylor	November 1, 2020	November 1, 2020	102A
Barbabright captured a melody from Mars. The Barbapapas build a rocket to go to the red planet.
6	6	"The Barbamartians" "Les Barbamartiens"	Alice and Thomas Taylor	Alice and Thomas Taylor	November 1, 2020	November 1, 2020	102B
While travelling to Mars, the Barbapapas meet a family of Barbamartians. They have no time to get acquainted when a giant plant attacks the village.
7	7	"The Barbababies' World" "Le monde des barbabébés"	Alice and Thomas Taylor	Alice and Thomas Taylor	September 3, 2020	April 18, 2021	120B
The Barbapapa family spends a day at the beach. Divided into 2 teams, the barbababies fight over a sandy peninsula.
8	8	"Where Did It Go, Barbabravo?" "Dur, Barbidur"	Alice and Thomas Taylor	Alice and Thomas Taylor	October 15, 2020	April 14, 2021	117A
Like a secret agent, Barbabravo leads the investigation equipped with his gadgets to find out who stole Barbapapa's cake.
9	9	"Barbazoo Can't Say "No"" "Barbidou ne sait pas dire non"	Alice and Thomas Taylor	Alice and Thomas Taylor	May 3, 2020	April 22, 2021	124A
Barbazoo is ready to help. But Barbabright and Barbabelle abuse his kindness and drive him crazy.
10	10	"From One Pit to Another" "De pépins en pépins"	Alice and Thomas Taylor	Alice and Thomas Taylor	March 18, 2020	November 8, 2020	104B
The Barbababies plant an avocado tree. However, it takes years before the first harvest. Barbabright has an idea to save time that may well lead to... disaster.
11	11	"Relay Tales" "Histoire de relais"	Alice and Thomas Taylor	Alice and Thomas Taylor	October 8, 2020	April 18, 2021	120A
Barbalib, Barbalala and Barbabelle take turns as narrators to tell a story, each one bringing a very personal touch to it.
12	12	"Where Is Bali?" "Où est Bali ?"	Alice and Thomas Taylor	Alice and Thomas Taylor	September 7, 2020	April 19, 2021	121B
Bali is nowhere to be found, and the Barbapapa deploy all their imagination to look for her. They have no idea that a nice surprise awaits them!
13	13	"The Barbapapa Tree" "L'arbre de Barbapapa"	Alice and Thomas Taylor	Alice and Thomas Taylor	March 4, 2020	November 1, 2020	101A
Barbapapa and Barbamama return to the tree they were born under. It's in bad condition. They must rescue it quickly without disturbing the nearby animals.
14	14	"The Competition Prize" "La tablette"	Alice and Thomas Taylor	Alice and Thomas Taylor	December 24, 2019	November 29, 2020	108A
The Barbababies win a touchpad. They all want to use it and snaffle it one after another.
15	15	"Boris"	Alice and Thomas Taylor	Alice and Thomas Taylor	December 1, 2019	November 8, 2020	103A
The barbababies find a lost baby elephant and secretly look after it. How will Barbapapa and Barbamama react to Boris?
16	16	"Super Duper Cool" "Trop trop la classe"	Alice and Thomas Taylor	Alice and Thomas Taylor	October 22, 2020	April 20, 2021	122B
The Barbapapa decide to save energy. But their efforts are undermined by Barbabright and Barbabelle who build a secret energy-consuming project.
17	17	"Born to be Wild" "Né pour être sauvage"	Alice and Thomas Taylor	Alice and Thomas Taylor	November 8, 2020	November 8, 2020	103B
Boris the elephant misses home. The Barbapapa decide to bring him back to Africa. On the spot, they help Boris to acclimatize.
18	18	"The Tenderest Bond of All" "Le plus tendre des liens"	Alice and Thomas Taylor	Alice and Thomas Taylor	November 24, 2019	November 15, 2020	105A
While the family makes pottery, Barbabravo and Barbabright try to set the world record for the largest cheese soufflé.
19	19	"The Cave Barbapapas" "Les Barbapapa des cavernes"	Alice and Thomas Taylor	Alice and Thomas Taylor	December 1, 2019	December 13, 2020	112A
The barbababies discover a strange cave. Barbalib tells the story of the caves Barbapapa and how they transformed.
20	20	"Father Christmas!" "Père Noël !"	Alice and Thomas Taylor	Alice and Thomas Taylor	December 2, 2020	November 29, 2021	119A
Barbapapa tells his children about his youth as an adventurer, where during a trip on the ice floe he met Father Christmas who gave him Lolita as a gift.
21	21	"Marvelous Moustaches" "Merveilleuses moustaches"	Alice and Thomas Taylor	Alice and Thomas Taylor	December 8, 2019	November 29, 2020	108B
Barbazoo collects photos of moustached celebrities. Unfortunately, it's impossible to find the last one: Charles Horseshoe-Furlip. He suspects a conspiracy...
22	22	"The Treasure Hunt" "La chasse au trésor"	Alice and Thomas Taylor	Alice and Thomas Taylor	September 8, 2020	April 11, 2021	114A
Mr. Strict's twins visit the barbababies. The barbababies organize a treasure hunt for the twins and enjoy the great outdoors.
23	23	"The Perfect Dinner" "La belle et les cochons"	Alice and Thomas Taylor	Alice and Thomas Taylor	January 5, 2020	December 20, 2020	113A
Barbapapa and Barbamama go out to celebrate their birthdays. Barbabelle is in charge and gets overwhelmed.
24	24	"The Seven Foods" "Les sept aliments"	Alice and Thomas Taylor	Alice and Thomas Taylor	September 10, 2020	April 26, 2021	126A
The Barbababies think their food can make them change colours and shapes. They decide to find the right food for each of them.
25	25	"Barbaprank!" "Barbafarce !"	Alice and Thomas Taylor	Alice and Thomas Taylor	November 17, 2019	November 29, 2020	107A
It's trick day. The Barbababies are busy playing pranks when Barbabright and Barbalala spot a dinosaur on their control screen. Real dinosaur or elaborate prank? They investigate.
26	26	"The Orange Empire" "L'empire orange"	Alice and Thomas Taylor	Alice and Thomas Taylor	January 8, 2020	November 15, 2020	105B
The Barbapapas decide to go to the park. While her brother and sisters play, Barbalib can't help to control everything.
27	27	"Going Into the Wild" "Vivre dans la nature"	Alice and Thomas Taylor	Alice and Thomas Taylor	December 4, 2019	April 11, 2021	114B
The Barbapapas are off to a new adventure... in the garden. But living in nature is more complicated than they expected.
28	28	"The Doppelganger" "Le sosie"	Alice and Thomas Taylor	Alice and Thomas Taylor	September 14, 2020	April 22, 2021	124B
By chance, Barbazoo realizes he can imitate Barbapapa. He uses this opportunity to distribute chores to his brothers and sisters. Will they find out?
29	29	"The Perfect Portrait" "Un portrait au poil"	Alice and Thomas Taylor	Alice and Thomas Taylor	September 15, 2020	April 26, 2021	126B
Barbabeau lacks inspiration, he can't create anymore. The whole family helps by suggesting new subjects to paint.
30	30	"The Wolf of Halloween" "Le loup d'Halloween"	Alice and Thomas Taylor	Alice and Thomas Taylor	October 30, 2020	November 29, 2020	107B
It's Halloween, the Barbababies are playing wolf in the barn.
31	31	"Clock and Dance" "Pour maman"	Alice and Thomas Taylor	Alice and Thomas Taylor	December 9, 2019	April 15, 2021	118A
The barbababies prepare a show for Barbamama's birthday. While Barbalala finishes up, they go to the carnival where Barbabeau gets stuck in an attraction.
32	32	"Hiccupism" "Le hoquisme"	Alice and Thomas Taylor	Alice and Thomas Taylor	September 20, 2020	April 13, 2021	116A
Barbabeau can't paint. He has a hiccup he can't get rid of. Just when he's about to give up, he accidentally creates a new artistic movement.
33	33	"Double Dare You" "Même pas cap !"	Alice and Thomas Taylor	Alice and Thomas Taylor	January 29, 2020	December 6, 2020	110A
On a ski trip, the Barbapapas build a giant igloo. Barbabravo and Barbalib challenge each other to find out who is braver.
34	34	"When I Grow Up" "Quand je serai grand"	Alice and Thomas Taylor	Alice and Thomas Taylor	November 10, 2019	December 13, 2020	111B
A bird builds its nest on Barbazoo's belly. Barbazoo wants to become a big tree to shelter animals. This becomes complicated.
35	35	"It's Only a Mystery..." "Détective Barbirlock"	Alice and Thomas Taylor	Alice and Thomas Taylor	February 5, 2020	November 15, 2020	106A
Taking after his favourite detective, Barbabravo looks for a case to solve. Can he solve the mystery of the missing ice statue?
36	36	"The Little Monsters" "Les petits monstres"	Alice and Thomas Taylor	Alice and Thomas Taylor	November 10, 2019	December 13, 2020	112B
The Barbababies have a sleepover in the living room. Fearing the monsters in the closet, they set up wacky traps to catch them.
37	37	"The Kittens" "Mes mignoux gouzoux"	Alice and Thomas Taylor	Alice and Thomas Taylor	November 15, 2020	December 20, 2020	113B
Barbabelle watches Bali's kittens. She's scared something will happen and won't let them out. Barbamama must intervene to help the kittens.
38	38	"The Grass Is Always Greener..." "L'herbe est toujours plus verte ailleurs"	Alice and Thomas Taylor	Alice and Thomas Taylor	March 25, 2020	December 13, 2020	111A
Barbabright coats the house in magic product to prevent water leakage. The next day, The house deflates like a balloon.
39	39	"The Battle" "La bagarre"	Alice and Thomas Taylor	Alice and Thomas Taylor	February 19, 2020	November 15, 2020	106B
Inspired by their favourite heroes, the Barbababies make costumes. But no heroes are possible without villains.
40	40	"Let Justice Be Done" "Que justice soit faite"	Alice and Thomas Taylor	Alice and Thomas Taylor	March 15, 2020	December 6, 2020	109A
Barbabeau forgot to return his book to the library. As Mr. Strict the librarian is visiting Barbapapa today, Barbabeau decides to run away.
41	41	"Barbapileup" "Barbacarambolage"	Alice and Thomas Taylor	Alice and Thomas Taylor	May 13, 2020	April 15, 2021	118B
Three separate stories telescope into a big final bouquet in the middle of the courtyard.
42	42	"The Barbababies' Birthday" "L'anniversaire des Barbabébés"	Alice and Thomas Taylor	Alice and Thomas Taylor	October 7, 2020	November 1, 2020	101B
It's the Barbababies's birthday. They all want to do something different with Barbapapa!
43	43	"Barba TV"	Alice and Thomas Taylor	Alice and Thomas Taylor	October 1, 2020	April 21, 2021	123A
The barbababies are glued to the TV. Since they love it so much, their parents encourage them to make their own shows.
44	44	"Roy"	Alice and Thomas Taylor	Alice and Thomas Taylor	March 1, 2020	December 6, 2020	110B
Barbabright creates a vacuuming robot that's also very good at soccer. The Barbababies organise a match against the robots.
45	45	"The Big Bad Hen" "La vilaine poule géante"	Alice and Thomas Taylor	Alice and Thomas Taylor	October 6, 2020	April 14, 2021	117B
Barbalala is convinced she heard a giant hen prowling around the house. The Barbababies organize themselves to stand guard.
46	46	"We Promise, Papa" "Promis Papa"	Alice and Thomas Taylor	Alice and Thomas Taylor	September 22, 2020	November 29, 2021	119B
The Barbababies waste too much water, so Barbapapa tells them about the time he was studying ancient Egypt and when he went to the desert in Egypt where he discovered the first water park fountain...
47	47	"Barbabright Has a Secret" "Barbibul a un secret"	Alice and Thomas Taylor	Alice and Thomas Taylor	October 9, 2020	April 20, 2021	122A
Barbabright acts strangely. What is he hiding? The Barbababies will do anything to find out.
48	48	"The Fuchsia Ocean" "L'océan fuchsia"	Alice and Thomas Taylor	Alice and Thomas Taylor	October 26, 2020	April 11, 2021	115A
Chemical sprays are making the countryside rosy! The Barbapapas' build an aviary to protect sick birds.
49	49	"The Museum" "Le muséum"	Alice and Thomas Taylor	Alice and Thomas Taylor	November 27, 2020	April 21, 2021	123B
The Barbapapa visit the museum of evolution. On the program: creation of the Earth, Precambrian submarine and... dinosaurs!
50	50	"Zero Waste" "Zéro déchet"	Alice and Thomas Taylor	Alice and Thomas Taylor	November 23, 2020	April 11, 2021	115B
When they see a beach covered with rubbish, the Barbapapa family decides to clean the beach and use the trash to make a miniature golf course.
51	51	"Greedyguts" "L'estomac sur pattes"	Alice and Thomas Taylor	Alice and Thomas Taylor	September 16, 2020	April 19, 2021	121A
A goat has escaped from the mountain and is coming to wreak havoc, devouring everything in its path!
52	52	"Silence Please" "Silence s'il vous plaît"	Alice and Thomas Taylor	Alice and Thomas Taylor	September 30, 2020	April 13, 2021	116B
Barbalib wants to complete in a writing contest but her brothers and sisters stop her from concentrating.

=== Season 2 (2023–25) ===
No. overall	No. in season	English translated title Original French title	Directed by	Written by	Original release date	English air date	Prod. code
53	1	"The Birth" (Note: Some of the TV shows or websites say the title of this episode as "The Birth of Barbapapa".) "La naissance"	Alice and Thomas Taylor	Alice and Thomas Taylor	November 5, 2023 (Note: The four-part season premiere aired slightly out of order on TF1. The episode "The Reveal" takes place after the episode "The Birth of Barbapapa". These episodes aired in their intended order worldwide, including Switzerland.)	June 2, 2024	206A
When young François goes to water his flowers one beautiful spring morning, he doesn't expect to witness the birth of Barbapapa. What a surprise, it's very rare!!! Barbapapa, François and his neighbor Claudine immediately become friends and François asks his father Edmond to welcome Barbapapa into their home. Unfortunately, Edmond doesn't agree and Barbapapa will have to go to the zoo...
54	2	"The Revelation" (Note: Some of the TV shows or websites say the title of this episode as "The Reveal".) "La révélation"	Alice and Thomas Taylor	Alice and Thomas Taylor	November 5, 2023	June 2, 2024	206B
Barbapapa is now a prisoner in the zoo. Locked up and desperate, he makes a chance discovery that reveals the true talent of the Barbapapa: transformation! Thanks to this ability, he manages to escape from his cage, but Mac Ravache, the owner of the zoo, is determined to catch him. Will Barbapapa be able to regain his freedom?
55	3	"The Barbapapa Family" (Note: Some of the TV shows or websites say the title of this episode as "Barbapapa's Family".) "La famille de Barbapapa"	Alice and Thomas Taylor	Alice and Thomas Taylor	November 5, 2023	June 3, 2024	207A
After leaving the zoo, Barbapapa finds refuge in the house that François' parents built for him. However, in the spring, a melancholic sadness takes hold of him. Worried, Jeanne and Edmond take him to Doctor Alcibiade who confirms that Barbapapa is in excellent health. Jeanne then has an idea: to regain his smile Barbapapa needs a Barbamama! But where to find her? Maybe on the moon?
56	4	"The House of Barbapapa" (Note: Some of the TV shows or websites say the title of this episode as "Babapapa's Home" and "Barbapapa's House".) "La maison de Barbapapa"	Alice and Thomas Taylor	Alice and Thomas Taylor	November 5, 2023	June 3, 2024	207B
Barbapapa is worried: the house built by Edmond and Jeanne is far too small now that Barbamama and the Barbababies have arrived in his life. They need a new home! That's when François finds a charming mansion in the city, which will be perfect once it's repaired. The whole family gets to work and prepares to move in, but Mac Ravache, now an entrepreneur, decides to demolish it to build apartment buildings. Faced with this situation, the Barbapapa family leaves the city and discovers a wonderful corner of paradise in the middle of nature. An ideal place to build their new home together.
57	5	"Moving Mission" "Je soulèverai le monde"	Alice and Thomas Taylor	Alice and Thomas Taylor	November 12, 2023	May 26, 2024	201A
During a walk, the Barbapapa family discovers a megalith. Each of the barbababies puts forward their own hypothesis about the presence of this imposing monument, how it was erected and transported here in ancient times. Barbamama then decides to pass on to the whole family the techniques that were used at that time.
58	6	"Barbabright's Invention" "Le Paf"	Alice and Thomas Taylor	Alice and Thomas Taylor	November 12, 2023	May 26, 2024	201B
Barbabright is tired of constantly searching for the same objects and has a stroke of genius: the invention of the "BAM". It is a ribbon that he wears on his head and that allows him to easily store everything. However, Barbalib quickly realizes the commercial potential of this invention and takes matters into her own hands, to the detriment of Barbabright and the environment.
59	7	"The Sand Is Running Away" (Note: Some of the TV shows or websites say the title of this episode as "The Sand Is Disappearing".) "Le sable se fait la malle"	Alice and Thomas Taylor	Alice and Thomas Taylor	November 18, 2023	May 30, 2024	205B
During one of their great adventures, Barbapapa and Lolita were traveling in a balloon, but caught in a storm they ended up stranded on a deserted island. At first disoriented, they eventually settled in comfortably and lived very happily there, until the day their beautiful island disappeared.
60	8	"Princess for a Day" "Princesse d'un jour"	Alice and Thomas Taylor	Alice and Thomas Taylor	November 18, 2023	May 27, 2024	202A
Barbabelle proudly announces to her family that she wants to become a princess. Despite the warnings from Barbalib who explains to her that it is not an easy task. The whole family then decides to support her and train her in her new royal duties.
61	9	"Barbidur's Odyssey" (Note: Some of the TV shows or websites say the title of this episode as "Barbabravo's Adventure") (Note: These episode titles refer to the titular characters by their French names instead of their English names.) "L'Odyssée de Barbidur"	Alice and Thomas Taylor	Alice and Thomas Taylor	November 19, 2023	May 27, 2024	202B
Barbabravo is moping with boredom, his brothers and sisters are all busy and no one wants to play with him. He decides to go for a walk alone. Upon his return, Barbamama asks him to tell about his day. Barbabravo then launches into an epic story, recounting how after surviving a shipwreck, he was saved by a goddess. Stranded on a distant island, he had to participate in the Olympics and face a giant.
62	10	"A Biodisaster" (Note: Some of the TV shows or websites say the title of this episode as "The Biodisaster" and "Biodisaster".) "Un biodésastre"	Alice and Thomas Taylor	Alice and Thomas Taylor	November 19, 2023	June 5, 2024	208B
Barbabright and Barbabeau have designed a huge wooden toy powered by an engine using bio oil. Upon seeing their creation, Barbapapa decides to tell them a memorable adventure with Lolita, during which he discovered the process of making this "ecological fuel".
63	11	"Dreams and Illusions" "Rêves et illusions"	Alice and Thomas Taylor	Alice and Thomas Taylor	November 25, 2023	May 29, 2024	204A
While everyone sleeps peacefully, one may wonder what Barbabelle, Barbabright, and Barbabeau could be dreaming about. After all, dreams are opportunities to learn, grow, and explore our imagination. And what about Lolita? (Note: This summary is possible, but there is something less clear about the explanation from the website with French language or others.)
64	12	"One Last for the Road" (Note: Some of the TV shows or websites say the title of this episode as "One Last Story, Then Off to Bed!".) "Une dernière et au dodo"	Alice and Thomas Taylor	Alice and Thomas Taylor	November 25, 2023	June 6, 2024	209A
The Barbababies love bedtime stories, except if they are always the same... Fortunately, Barbamama decides to revisit children's tales with all her imagination! It's so much fun and we learn so many things, that we would like it to never end.
65	13	"Apprentice Dreamers" (Note: Some of the TV shows or websites say the title of this episode as "Dreaming Apprentices".) "Apprentis rêveurs"	Alice and Thomas Taylor	Alice and Thomas Taylor	November 26, 2023	May 29, 2024	204B
Dreaming makes you grow... But what can Barbabravo, Barbalala, Barbalib, and Barbazoo possibly dream about?
66	14	"The Little Critters" (Note: Some of the TV shows or websites say the title of this episode as "Lots of Insects".) "Les petites bestioles"	Alice and Thomas Taylor	Alice and Thomas Taylor	November 26, 2023	June 6, 2024	209B
Barbabelle had a restless night because of the crickets, and to top it off, she was bitten by a mosquito and chased by a wasp. She's had enough of all these insects! But does she know how important they are for the balance of nature? Fortunately, Barbapapa is there to explain and show her how to protect them.
67	15	"Ah! My Beautiful Castle" (Note: Some of the TV shows or websites say the title of this episode as "My Beautiful Castle".) "Ah ! Mon beau château"	Alice and Thomas Taylor	Alice and Thomas Taylor	December 3, 2023	May 30, 2024	205A
During a bike ride, the Barbapapa family discovers an old medieval castle in ruins. They cannot leave it in this state and quickly begin to restore it. Then, at nightfall, while everyone is asleep, Barbazoo hears strange noises coming from the castle. Quickly joined by Barbalala and Barbabright, they decide to investigate these mysterious sounds. Let's go on a ghost hunt!
68	16	"Bbarbalalalalalala"	Alice and Thomas Taylor	Alice and Thomas Taylor	December 3, 2023	June 5, 2024	208A
Barbalala is a great composer and music is her whole life! Yes, but sometimes you also have to tidy up your room, do your homework, and help your brothers and sisters when parents give them small tasks. That's also what family life is about!
69	17	"Barbidou's Journal" (Note: Some of the TV shows or websites say the title of this episode as "Barbazoo's Diary".) "Le journal de Barbidou"	Alice and Thomas Taylor	Alice and Thomas Taylor	December 3, 2023	June 7, 2024	210A
Barbazoo recounts the exciting Day he had.
70	18	"Private Club" "Club privé"	Alice and Thomas Taylor	Alice and Thomas Taylor	December 9, 2023	June 10, 2024	211A
Barbabeau, Barbabelle, and Barbabright have built a treehouse. The other Barbababies are curious and would like to discover this incredible place, but it is a private club whose access is reserved for members who have passed certain tests. Is it really worth it? Is the place as extraordinary as it seems? Is it worth causing discord among the Barbababies?
71	19	"The Invasion" (Note: Some of the TV shows or websites say the title of this episode as "Invasion".) "L'invasion"	Alice and Thomas Taylor	Alice and Thomas Taylor	December 9, 2023	June 11, 2024	212A
Barbalala received a package sent by her Brazilian correspondent, inside she discovers two beautiful little pink animals that she names the SQUEAKIES. In no time, the SQUEAKIES multiply and end up invading the entire house. Barbapapa then explains that certain animal and plant species must remain in their natural habitat to avoid disturbing the ecological balance. Let's go on an adventure, we must bring the SQUEAKIES back to Brazil!
72	20	"The Louvre" "Le Louvre"	Alice and Thomas Taylor	Alice and Thomas Taylor	December 10, 2023	March 3, 2025	214A
On a trip to Paris, the Barbapapa family will discover the most incredible museum: the Louvre! Unfortunately, Barbalala has overlooked a crucial detail, it is strictly forbidden to eat in a museum...
73	21	"Great Reporter" (Note: Some of the TV shows or websites say the title of this episode as "The Great Reporter".) "Grand reporter"	Alice and Thomas Taylor	Alice and Thomas Taylor	December 10, 2023	June 7, 2024	210B
After reading the biography of Nellie Bly, Barbalib is determined to become a Great Reporter! But how can she create a newspaper with interesting articles that appeal to everyone when she is too young to explore the world?
74	22	"The Green Algae" (Note: Some of the TV shows or websites say the title of this episode as "Green Algae".) "Les algues vertes"	Alice and Thomas Taylor	Alice and Thomas Taylor	December 17, 2023	June 10, 2024	211B
Green algae are dangerous! And Barbamama wants to know more about these algae that have invaded the beach where her children play. She is determined to stop this foul pollution.
75	23	"The Prank War" (Note: Some of the TV shows or websites say the title of this episode as "Prank Day".) "La guerre des canulars"	Alice and Thomas Taylor	Alice and Thomas Taylor	December 17, 2023	June 11, 2024	212B
Barbabravo, Barbalala and Barbabeau are fed up with their brothers and sisters laughing at their expense. We need to organize the most incredible prank to win the prank war.
76	24	"Watch Out for Barbibul" (Note: Some of the TV shows or websites say the title of this episode as "Watch Out for Barbabright".) "Gaffe à Barbibul"	Alice and Thomas Taylor	Alice and Thomas Taylor	January 20, 2024	June 12, 2024	213A
When the twins visit Barbabright's room, they are surprised at every turn because for each area of the room, chemistry, electronics, and mechanics... Barbabright has an incredible story to tell them!
77	25	"Billionaires" (Note: Some of the TV shows or websites say the title of this episode as "If I Were a Billionaire".) "Milliardaires"	Alice and Thomas Taylor	Alice and Thomas Taylor	December 31, 2023 (Switzerland); January 21, 2024 (France)	June 12, 2024	213B
If I were a billionaire, what would I do to achieve my dreams? Each of the barbababies has a very specific idea of what they would do.
78	26	"The Decoder" "Les décodeurs"	Alice and Thomas Taylor	Alice and Thomas Taylor	January 27, 2024	March 5, 2025	216B
Barbabright has created a clever decoder capable of translating the cries of animals into our language, but the animals on the farm and in the garden are not very captivating. Barbazoo then suggests going to listen to marine animals.
79	27	"Opposite Day" "Le jour des contraires"	Alice and Thomas Taylor	Alice and Thomas Taylor	January 27, 2024	March 3, 2025	214B
Barbalala has decided to respect all the rules of the day of opposites, a custom that comes from very ancient times. Her brothers and sisters join her and it's time for a day of opposites!
80	28	"Going with the Flow" "Laissez couler"	Alice and Thomas Taylor	Alice and Thomas Taylor	January 28, 2024	March 5, 2025	216A
The Barbababies are bored, the rain is preventing them from playing outside. Fortunately, Barbamama and Barbapapa know that with a little imagination, you can do lots of things in the rain. And imagination! The Barbababies have plenty of it, sometimes even too much.
81	29	"Paper Landscapes" "Paysages en papier"	Alice and Thomas Taylor	Alice and Thomas Taylor	January 28, 2024	March 6, 2025	217A
Barbamama and Barbapapa are surprised to see more and more billboards on the road. Light pollution makes the stars invisible and you can't walk without bumping into a pole. Enough is enough! We must act as a family.
82	30	"Innovation Melting Pot" "Bouillon d'inventions"	Alice and Thomas Taylor	Alice and Thomas Taylor	February 3, 2024	March 7, 2025	218A
When Barbabright explains to his brothers and sisters what a brilliant inventor Leonardo da Vinci was, each of them wants to create their own invention. Not everyone is a genius, but it's still very fun to invent.
83	31	"Cowgirl"	Alice and Thomas Taylor	Alice and Thomas Taylor	February 3, 2024	March 6, 2025	217B
Barbalala dreams of becoming a cowgirl and Barbazoo is determined to help her. To achieve this, she must learn to take care of the cows and the bull. It's not an easy task, but if she remains perseverant, Barbalala should become a great cowgirl.
84	32	"Summer Camp" (I & II) "La colonie de vacances" (I & II)	Alice and Thomas Taylor	Alice and Thomas Taylor	January 6, 2024 (Switzerland); March 30, 2024 (France)	May 28, 2024	203
85	33	"Summer Camp" (I & II) "La colonie de vacances" (I & II)	Alice and Thomas Taylor	Alice and Thomas Taylor	January 6, 2024 (Switzerland); March 30, 2024 (France)	May 28, 2024	203
(I): Barbapapa and Barbamama have announced to their dear barbababies that they are going on a trip to Easter Island. Meanwhile, the Barbababies will go to summer camp with Mr. Strict and his twins to go camping by a lake. Excited about this idea, the barbababies will quickly realize that setting up a camping camp is not easy... But who knows, maybe it could still be fun? (II): Camping near a lake, the Barbababies, the twins, and Mr. Strict set sail on "Thésée", a magnificent sailboat. Everything is calm, but sailing on a lake is sometimes not so easy, especially when the wind picks up like a tornado. It will take all the courage of the Barbababies to avoid shipwreck and return safely to their parents.
86	34	"Child of the Stars" (I & II) "Enfant des étoiles" (I & II)	Alice and Thomas Taylor	Alice and Thomas Taylor	February 4, 2024 (Switzerland); October 6, 2024 (France)	March 4, 2025	215
87	35	"Child of the Stars" (I & II) "Enfant des étoiles" (I & II)	Alice and Thomas Taylor	Alice and Thomas Taylor	February 4, 2024 (Switzerland); October 6, 2024 (France)	March 4, 2025	215
(I): While they were scanning the sky in search of the comet Proteus, Barbabright and Lolita spotted a flying saucer approaching their house. Without wasting any time, Barbapapa woke up the whole family to discover the identity of these space travelers. But of course, they were their martian friends and they had a special guest with them: a baby with big feet mysteriously appeared on their planet. The Barbapapa then offered to find his family. Thus, a new mission is announced for Badabam, the rocket, which eagerly sniffs the baby's teddy bear in search of a trail in the stars. (II): The Barbapapa have taken off aboard Badabam in the hope of discovering the planet of Baby Big Feet. But not everything goes as planned, and Badabam, rendered out of control by Barbabravo, lands in a strange place. How will they manage to get out of it and find the planet of Baby Big Feet?
88	36	"Make Up Your Mind Barbazoo" "Décide toi Barbidou"	Alice and Thomas Taylor	Alice and Thomas Taylor	March 10, 2024 (Switzerland); November 24, 2024 (France)	March 7, 2025	218B
The Barbababies must choose between going to the pool or going for a bike ride. Immediately, two camps form, each with their own preference, and only Barbazoo can tip the balance. What should they choose? He doesn't know, it's so difficult to decide. His brothers and sisters will try to convince him.
89	37	"Tumbles, Where Did You Go?" "Où es-tu Tototutu ?"	Alice and Thomas Taylor	Alice and Thomas Taylor	May 26, 2024 (Switzerland); November 2, 2024 (France)	March 14, 2025	221B
Tumbles, Barbabravo's favorite toy car, has mysteriously disappeared in the living room. While searching for it, Barbabravo, Barbabelle, and Barbabright discover a strange hole under the couch... What if Tumbles had fallen to the center of the earth?
90	38	"I'm Not a Barbababy Anymore" "Je ne suis plus un Barbabébé"	Alice and Thomas Taylor	Alice and Thomas Taylor	May 19, 2024 (Switzerland); November 3, 2024 (France)	March 17, 2025	222A
No! No! No! It's over! Barbabravo is no longer a baby, he's a big boy now! And today, he's going to live his day like a big boy: no more naps, no more snacks, and no more playing with his brothers and sisters.
91	39	"Buttercup" "Choupinette"	Alice and Thomas Taylor	Alice and Thomas Taylor	May 19, 2024 (Switzerland); January 11, 2025 (France)	March 19, 2025	223A
Barbazoo's beautiful roses mysteriously disappeared during the night. He's sure it's Barbabelle's doing! But how can he get a confession? Barbazoo decides to give her a special doll to better keep an eye on her.
92	40	"Roboxman" "Robemballeur"	Alice and Thomas Taylor	Alice and Thomas Taylor	May 19, 2024 (Switzerland); October 26, 2024 (France)	March 18, 2025	222B
The barbababies are going to the hypermarket for the first time. With all these products, it must be an exceptional place! But why is everything wrapped in plastic? It's probably Roboxman's fault...
93	41	"The Barbababies Have Got Talent" "Les Barbabébés ont du talent"	Alice and Thomas Taylor	Alice and Thomas Taylor	March 10, 2024 (Switzerland); October 13, 2024 (France)	March 11, 2025	220A
Today is the big talent competition organized by Barbalala. Every barbababy is invited to show their greatest talent on stage, but be careful, Barbalala will be uncompromising!
94	42	"Vandal!" "Vandale"	Alice and Thomas Taylor	Alice and Thomas Taylor	March 24, 2024 (Switzerland); November 9, 2024 (France)	March 13, 2025	221A
Barbabravo catches a mysterious masked vandal who has just fled after painting on the wall of the house. This is a case for detective Barbirlock and doctor Barbabelson!
95	43	"Living Together" "Bien vivre ensemble"	Alice and Thomas Taylor	Alice and Thomas Taylor	June 2, 2024 (Switzerland); November 10, 2024 (France)	March 25, 2025	225A
For the very first time, the Barbababies will take the train and sleep in a hotel. Barbamama will accompany them, while Barbapapa will join them by road with the load of pottery. The big annual fair is approaching and Barbamama must sell all her creations there, provided that Barbapapa manages to bring them on time.
96	44	"Holey the Snowman" "Bobo"	Alice and Thomas Taylor	Alice and Thomas Taylor	June 2, 2024 (Switzerland); November 16, 2024 (France)	March 26, 2025	225B
The snow fell without warning, and the Barbababies took advantage of it to have a big snowball fight, except for Barbabeau who crafted a magnificent snowman that the children named Holey. But how can they preserve Holey when spring comes? A race against time begins.
97	45	"Gloop Gloop Ah-Ha" (Note: Some of the TV shows or websites say the title of this episode as "Gloop Gloop Ah-Ah".) "Glup glup ahaaa"	Alice and Thomas Taylor	Alice and Thomas Taylor	June 9, 2024 (Switzerland); November 17, 2024 (France)	March 24, 2025	224B
How delicious lemonade is! Everyone wants more! That's Barbalib's great idea – to start a business and create the best lemonade.
98	46	"Rebels" "Rebelles"	Alice and Thomas Taylor	Alice and Thomas Taylor	March 3, 2024 (Switzerland); October 27, 2024 (France)	March 10, 2025	219A
Barbapapa explains to Barbabravo and Barbalala that no one can stop them from playing as they wish, but the two children may not have understood very well that Barbapapa did not authorize them to become little rebels.
99	47	"The Puppet" "La troupe des marionnettes"	Alice and Thomas Taylor	Alice and Thomas Taylor	June 2, 2024 (Switzerland); November 23, 2024 (France)	March 21, 2025	224A
When they discover Bibabobu, the puppet made by Barbabeau, the Barbababies decide to create a show and go all out! Each one has their own role, and all the stage professions will be represented.
100	48	"Barbascience"	Alice and Thomas Taylor	Alice and Thomas Taylor	March 10, 2024 (Switzerland); October 12, 2024 (France)	March 10, 2025	219B
But who are the Barbapapa? They come in all colors, can transform at will, and some are hairy... Only Barbascience can answer that.
101	49	"We Need to Save the Corals" "Sauvons les coraux"	Alice and Thomas Taylor	Alice and Thomas Taylor	April 21, 2024	March 20, 2025	223B
Children discover a photo of baby Lolita in the family album. Barbapapa then decides to tell the barbababies about the time he went with Lolita to explore the Arctic and the seabed on board the Barbotilus.
102	50	"Triple Switcheroo" "Tri-quiproquo"	Alice and Thomas Taylor	Alice and Thomas Taylor	March 24, 2024 (Switzerland); November 30, 2024 (France)	March 12, 2025	220B
Video games are fun, but you also need to know how to enjoy the nice weather! Barbamama and Barbapapa decide to create outdoor adventure games for the Barbababies. Be careful when distributing roles and puzzles to everyone, as this could create misunderstandings.
103	51	"The Moutain Eater" (Note: The episode title of the English version says "The Moutain Eater", the correct name is "The Mountain Eater" because the name of this episode title is not quite right.) "Dévoreur de montagnes"	Alice and Thomas Taylor	Alice and Thomas Taylor	June 9, 2024 (Switzerland); January 4, 2025 (France)	March 27, 2025	226A
Some animals are very scary and seem very dangerous! Barbapapa tells the Barbababies about his extraordinary adventure with Lolita climbing the Pic des Ducs and their encounter with the wolf.
104	52	"The First Day of School" "C'est la rentrée !"	Alice and Thomas Taylor	Alice and Thomas Taylor	June 9, 2024 (Switzerland); October 7, 2024 (France)	March 28, 2025	226B
Tomorrow is the Barbababies' first day of school, and each one is preparing in their own way. It's a bit stressful to go to school for the first time, you have to think of everything.

== Broadcast ==
In honor of the 50th anniversary of the Barbapapa franchise as a whole, the series was released worldwide on Nickelodeon and Nick Jr. channels in over 100 territories throughout late 2020 and early 2021. This allowed for the series to be dubbed into a wide variety of languages, including some which the original Barbapapa series and Around the World have never been dubbed into before. The first countries to premiere the series outside of France were Italy, Germany and Austria.

The English dub was produced in the United Kingdom, but the series did not air on British television until July 10, 2021. The English dub also airs in Australia and New Zealand, as well as via secondary audio tracks in Italy, Germany, Austria and on Nick Jr.'s Global feed.

Yle TV2 in Finland premiered the series on January 1, 2021 as part of the Pikku Kakkonen programming block for children, making it the first non-Nickelodeon channel outside of the French-speaking world to air the series.
