= Go, Dog. Go! (TV series) =

American animated television series

- Season 1 promotional poster
- Genre: Comedy; Sports
- Based on: Go, Dog. Go! by P. D. Eastman
- Developed by: Adam Peltzman
- Voices of: Michela Luci; Callum Shoniker
- Theme music composer: Paul Buckley
- Opening theme: "Go, Dog. Go!" by Paul Buckley, Reno Selmser and Zoe D'Andrea
- Composer: Paul Buckley
- Countries of origin: United States; Canada
- Original language: English
- No. of seasons: 4
- No. of episodes: 40 (75 segments) (+1 special)

Production
- Executive producers: Adam Peltzman; Lynn Kestin Sessler (seasons 1–3); Chris Angelilli; Josh Scherba; Stephanie Betts; Amir Nasrabadi (season 1–3); Anne Loi (season 4)
- Producer: Morgana Duque
- Editors: Ken Mackenzie; Gina Pacheco; Ryan Valade
- Running time: 23 minutes (two 11-minute segments)
- Production companies: DreamWorks Animation Television; WildBrain Studios

Original release
- Network: Netflix
- Release: January 26, 2021 – November 27, 2023

Go, Dog. Go! is an animated children's sports comedy television series based on the 1961 children's book of the same name by P. D. Eastman, which was developed for Netflix by Adam Peltzman.

Co-produced by DreamWorks Animation Television and WildBrain Studios, the first season premiered on January 26, 2021, followed by the second on December 7 of the same year, the third on September 19, 2022, and a fourth and final season on November 27, 2023.

== Premise ==
The series revolves around the lifestyle of two young canines, Tag Barker and Scooch Pooch, in their canine town of Pawston.

== Characters ==
=== Main ===
- Tag Barker (voiced by Michela Luci in the American dub and Maisie Marsh in the British dub) is a 6-year-old orange dog resembling a Beagador. Tag is the only dog to appear in all episodes and segments, and is very energetic and open. She is skilled at making inventions.
- Scooch Pooch (voiced by Callum Shoniker in the American dub and Toby Fullman in the British dub) is a 6-year-old small blue dog resembling a Terrier. Scooch is a new neighbor in the town of Pawston (as he has moved in from a farm), and he is more shy and reserved compared to Tag. He is Tag's best friend and neighbor.
- Maw Barker (voiced by Katie Griffin in the American dub and Petra Letang in the British dub) is a lavender dog resembling a Beagador. She is one of the Pawston blimp pilots, and is the mother of Tag, Cheddar Biscuit, Gilber, Spike and Yip Barker.
- Paw Barker (voiced by Martin Roach in the American dub and Jude Owusu in the British dub) is a brown dog resembling a Beagador. He owns and runs the Ding Dong Doorbell store, and is the father of Tag, Cheddar Biscuit, Gilber, Spike and Yip Barker.
- Cheddar Biscuit (voiced by Tajja Isen in the American dub and Hannah Hutch in the British dub) is a white polka-dotted dog resembling a Beagador. She is a clown and loves performing for people, and is the sister of Tag, Gilber, Spike and Yip Barker. She is very supportive of Tag but often gets competitive with her. Gilber often performs with her on her acts.
- Spike Barker (voiced by Lyon Smith) is a red dog resembling a Beagador. Spike left the Race Cadets to join the Space Cadets, and is the brother of Tag, Cheddar Biscuit, Gilber and Yip Barker. He is very athletic and likes sports.
- Gilber Barker (voiced by Lyon Smith in the American dub and James Cartmell in the British dub) is a yellow dog resembling a Beagador, and is the schemer of the Barkers, and Tag's frenemy. He is the brother of Tag, Cheddar Biscuit, Spike and Yip Barker. He often works alongside Cheddar Biscuit whenever she is performing or competing against Tag.
- Grandmaw Marge Barker (voiced by Judy Marshak in the American dub and Victoria Strachan in the British dub) is a purple dog resembling a Beagador. She is the Barker family matriarch, and is the grandmother of Tag, Cheddar Biscuit, Gilber, Spike and Yip Barker. Both Marge and Mort run a repair shop in Pawston.
- Grandpaw Mort Barker (voiced by Patrick McKenna in the American dub and Laurie Jamieson in the British dub) is a beige dog resembling a Beagle crossed with a Basset Hound. He runs a repair shop with Marge, and is the grandfather of Tag, Cheddar Biscuit, Gilber, Spike and Yip Barker.
- Yip Barker (voiced by Diane Salemi) is a purple puppy resembling a Beagador. He is the brother of Tag, Cheddar Biscuit, Spike and Gilber Barker.
- Sgt. Pooch (voiced by Linda Ballantyne) is a blue dog resembling a Terrier who is Scooch's mother and a police officer in Pawston.

=== Supporting ===
- Frank (voiced by David Berni in the American dub and Adam Diggle in the British dub) is a yellow bespectacled dog resembling a cross between a Beagle and a Dachshund and one of Tag's arch-rivals. Frank is a rude dog and is always scheming for selfish ends and is the brains of the duo between him and Beans. He also loves to eat nachos.
- Beans (voiced by Anand Rajaram in the American dub and Shubham Saraf in the British dub) is a large green dog resembling an Old English Sheepdog in an aviator's flight cap and one of Tag's arch-rivals/frenemy. Beans is idiotic but kindhearted and often serves as the muscle to Frank's schemes. He still considers Frank to be his best friend despite being a bit oblivious to Frank's rude personality.
- Lady Lydia (voiced by Linda Ballantyne) is a rose-colored Poodle who is famous in Pawston for having the most hats of any dog in town. She is based on a recurring character in the book who frequently appears wearing a new hat to which she asks for compliments on. Despite her hat obsession, she has proven to be helpful to the residents of Pawston and is a close friend to Tag and Scooch.
- Gerald (voiced by Patrick McKenna) is a teal dog resembling a cross between a Terrier and a Great Dane. Gerald is one of Pawston's more recent arrivals, and works in the town delivering mail.
- Muttfield (voiced by Patrick McKenna) is a purple dog resembling a cross between a Beagador and a Bulldog. He is a famous magician in Pawston.
- Manhole Dog (Todd) (voiced by Patrick McKenna) is a beige dog resembling a Golden Retriever. As his name suggests, Manhole Dog is often seen peeking out of manholes all over Pawston, and he also wears a manhole cover on his head. He is also secretly Master Wag, a master of the art known as "Tail-kwondo".
- Mayor Sniffington (voiced by Linda Ballantyne) is a purple dog resembling a cross between a Beagador and a pug who is the mayor of Pawston.
- Sam Whippet (voiced by Joshua Graham) is a blue dog resembling a Greyhound. Whippet is a Pawston celebrity, having several undefeated streaks in the race course, and Tag idolizes him.
- The Barkapellas are a trio of dogs who sing harmonically instead of speaking. They all have mohawks and wear ties, shirt collars and suit cuffs.
  - Tenor (voiced by Paul Buckley) is the tall orange male of the Barkapellas.
  - Bass (voiced by Reno Selmser) is the short purple male of the Barkapellas.
  - Alto (voiced by Zoe D'Andrea) is the medium-sized cyan female of the Barkapellas.
- Beefsteak (voiced by Tajja Isen) is a strong pink dog resembling a Chihuahua. She is an exercise coach at the Ruff and Tumble Gym.
- Wind Swiftly (voiced by Ava Preston) is a purple dog and the captain on the Race Cadets.
- Tread Lightly is a teal dog.
- Doug is a yellow dog.
- Wagnes (voiced by Judy Marshak) is a blue dog who works at the Big Bowl Diner. In fact, she is the only dog who works there. She has an unenthusiastic personality, but she has a strong passion for her work, and the residents of Pawston admire her cooking. She also revealed in one episode that she is a good country singer.
- Hambonio is a red hairdresser dog.
- Big Dog (voiced by Matthew Mucci) is a large white dog with large grey ears, who is friends with Little Dog.
- Little Dog (voiced by Hattie Kragten) is a small purple dog, who is friends with Big Dog.
- Coach Chewman (voiced by Phill Williams) is a red dog.
- Gabe Roof (voiced by Phill Williams) is a yellow dog.
- Waggs Martinez (voiced by Linda Ballantyne) is a purple dog.
- Flip Chasely (voiced by Anand Rajaram) is a brown dog.
- Catch Morely (voiced by Julie Lemieux) is a blue dog.
- Donny Slippers (voiced by Jamie Watson) is a red dog.
- Bernard Rubber (voiced by Joshua Graham) is a little teal dog.
- Kit Whiskerton (voiced by Zarina Rocha) is a purple cat who is Tom's daughter and a friend of Tag and Scooch.

=== Others ===
- Fetcher (voiced by Deven Mack) is a teal dog resembling a cross between a Beagle, a Poodle, and a Labrador Retriever. Fetcher has been stranded on Ball Island ever since he was a pup after he chased after his favorite ball.
- Kelly Korgi (voiced by Stacey Kay) is a peach-colored dog who resembles a cross between a corgi and a Shiba Inu. Kelly is a well-renowned singer and popstar amongst the citizens of Pawston, and her music is excitedly received.
- Leo Howlstead (voiced by John Stocker) is an elderly grey dog who resembles a cross between Great Dane, a husky, and a German Shepherd. Leo lives in a Senior Center and used to be a row cadet, and unlike the vast majority of his fellow seniors he is very active.
- Yellow (voiced by Danny Smith) is a yellow dog resembling a beagador. He is often seen at the amusement park target stands, and awards winners with their prizes in a deadpan manner.
- Sandra Paws (voiced by Deann DeGruijter) is a large icy blue dog.
- Taylee (voiced by Manvi Thapar) is a teal puppy.
- Rhonda (voiced by Diane Salemi) is a light blue puppy.
- Chili (voiced by Anand Rajaram) is a large red dog resembling an Old English Sheepdog and is Beans's cousin.
- Franny is a brown puppy.
- Franny's Mom (voiced by Tajja Isen) is a mint green dog.
- Franny's Dad (voiced by Joshua Graham) is a blue dog.
- Bowser (voiced by Anand Rajaram) is a blue dog.
- Cam Snapshot is a pink dog.
- Early Ed (voiced by Robert Tinkler) is a green dog.
- Jerry is a brown dog.
- Onlooker Dog (voiced by Anand Rajaram) is a yellow dog.
- Brutus (voiced by Patrick McKenna) is a blue dog who is Kelly Korgi's bodyguard.
- Marcus Worms (voiced by David Berni) is a pink dog.
- Truck Driver (voiced by Joshua Graham) is a green dog.
- Tom Whiskerton (voiced by Paul Braunstein) is a grey cat and Kit's father who is a firefighter from Meowburquerque.
- Darrell is a blue dog who is Muttfield's assistant.
- Dale Mation is a dalmatian who is the firefighter of Pawston.
- Sandwich Dog (voiced by Patrick McKenna) is a purple dog.
- Waggles is a pink clown dog.
- Bowowzo & Wowbowzo are a duo of purple clown dogs.
- The Boingos are a group of teal clown dogs.
- Soppy is a blue clown dog.
- Struggles is a blue clown dog.
- The Cannon Triplets are a trio of yellow clown dogs.

== Episodes ==
=== Series overview ===
Season	Episodes	Segments	Originally released
1	9	16	January 26, 2021
2	9	16	December 7, 2021
3	8	16	September 19, 2022
4	14	26	November 27, 2023

=== Season 1 (2021) ===
No. overall	No. in season	Title	Directed by	Written by	Original release date
1	1	"Welcome to Pawston"	Andrew Duncan	Adam Peltzman	January 26, 2021
1	1	"Ruff Day on the Job"	Andrew Duncan	Adam Peltzman	January 26, 2021
Welcome to Pawston: Tag Barker meets her new neighbor Scooch Pooch, and as she shows him around town, Tag tries everything to get him to the party in a tree. Her impatience, however, ends up stranding the two on a mountain far from the party, but luckily, they had help. Ruff Day on the Job: Tag and Scooch help Gerald, a new mail dog, deliver the mail during his first day, but they are chased by rowdy dogs. Tag comes up with an idea to help Gerald deliver mail using Scooch's tractor.
2	2	"Dark Park Bark Lark"	Andrew Duncan	Mark Banker	January 26, 2021
2	2	"The Fast and the Curious"	Andrew Duncan	Mark Banker	January 26, 2021
Dark Park Bark Lark: Tag wants her and Scooch to have the best seats before a Barkapella concert at the end of the day, but Scooch has to finish off a long list of chores first. While Tag offers to help, Frank and Beans want the best concert seats, and will stop at nothing to make sure they can't get them. The Fast and the Curious: Spike Barker has left the Race Cadets, and Tag is ecstatic about filling in his spot. When she employs Scooch as her crew chief during Race Cadet tryouts, however, she doesn't listen to him until it is too late, causing them to lose a point.
3	3	"Old Dog, New Tricks"	Andrew Duncan	Jordana Arkin	January 26, 2021
3	3	"Snoozie-Hullabaloozie"	Kiran Sangherra	Adam Peltzman	January 26, 2021
Old Dog New Tricks: The Barker family is having a family talent show, and when Tag chooses Grandpaw to be her teammate, they set off to find a new trick to win the show. Snoozie-Hullabaloozie: On a special day where all of Pawston get to sleep for the entire day, Tag doesn't want to sleep, and she and Scooch try to have fun without waking up the others. When they wake Frank and Beans, however, they find the two are far less considerate, especially when they ring a giant doorbell and wake the whole town, therefore Tag and Scooch need to find a way to get the town back to sleep.
4	4	"Show Dog, Show"	Kiran Sangherra	Matt Smith	January 26, 2021
4	4	"Keys to Victory"	Kiran Sangherra	Matt Smith	January 26, 2021
Show Dog, Show: Tag has made a new car she wants to show at a one-day only car show, but Cheddar Biscuit brings along several of her clown friends, and they end up being later and later, which as a result, causes everyone to miss her car show until Tag and Cheddar Biscuit had an idea. Keys to Victory: Sam Whippet, the Pawston racing champion, loses the car keys for his race car before a big race. The Race Cadet candidates are therefore needed to find it or Sam will lose for the first time in history. Tag and Scooch go to find and deliver car keys for him.
5	5	"Pupcakes"	Kiran Sangherra	Alex Ganetakos	January 26, 2021
5	5	"Stink or Swim"	Andrew Duncan	Brian Clark	January 26, 2021
Pupcakes: Scooch has made a delicious pupcake and Tag wants everyone in Pawston to try one, but her gusto ends up making an absolute mess of the kitchen, and they need all the dogs' help. Stink or Swim: A competition is in progress to clean the beach, and the winners get the entire beach to themselves for one day. Frank and Beans, however, have no interest in cleaning the mess, and they set out to make the place an absolute pigsty.
6	6	"A Ball for All"	Andrew Duncan	Mark Banker	January 26, 2021
Tag and Scooch forgot to give balls to their moms on Ballentines day, and they set off to a legendary island full of balls to correct their big mistake where they meets a dog named Fetcher, who has been stranded on the island ever since he was a puppy and gives them a challenge.
7	7	"Ding Dong Day"	Kiran Sangherra	Nicole Belisle	January 26, 2021
7	7	"Grand Sam"	Kiran Sangherra	Nicole Belisle	January 26, 2021
Ding Dong Day: For "Take Your Child to Work" day, Paw brings Tag along to the Ding Dong Doorbell Store. Tag is amazed to see how skilled Paw is at fixing and selling all kinds of doorbells and even gets the chance to help out herself. Grand Sam: The Race Candidates are undertaking an obstacle course to further his chances to become official Race Cadets, but while Cheddar Biscuit and Gilbert get a paw on teamwork, Tag and Frank are determined to beat each other, and they end up losing points for abandoning their teammates.
8	8	"Clucky Day"	Kiran Sangherra	Adam Peltzman	January 26, 2021
8	8	"Take Me Out to the Fetch Game"	Kiran Sangherra	Adam Peltzman	January 26, 2021
Clucky Day: Scooch is feeling down as he is missing a special day about chickens on his old farm. While Lady Lydia distracts him, Tag sets out to bring the holiday to Pawston, and sets out to get chickens with Beans's help. Take Me Out to the Fetch Game: When Pawston's local fetch coach mixes up game days, Tag and Scooch must find the players for the day's big fetch game before the team automatically loses, but one particular player is proving hard to find.
9	9	"Dog the Right Thing"	Andrew Duncan	Mark Banker	January 26, 2021
On the final challenge to become Race Cadets, Tag is giving it her all, but in the end, she succeeds in a way she never expects when Cheddar Biscuit and Frank lets Tag cross the finish line.

=== Season 2 (2021) ===
No. overall	No. in season	Title	Directed by	Written by	Original release date
10	1	"Snow Dog Snow"	Kiran Sangherra	Adam Peltzman	December 7, 2021
Sniffsmas is headed for a disaster when Sandra Paws crash lands and her sleigh can't be fixed. While Tag and Scooch head off to save the holiday, Beans tries hard to get local scrooge Frank to understand the true meaning of the holidays.
11	2	"All Paws On Deck"	Andrew Duncan	Matt Smith	December 7, 2021
11	2	"Bonestand and Deliver"	Andrew Duncan	Nicole Belisle	December 7, 2021
All Paws on Deck: A thoughtful Tag tries to re-create the first time her parents met for their anniversary, but her attempts only send the family towards chaos. Bonestand and Deliver: Tag rallies a crew to rebuild the Bonestand for Pawston's 100th birthday, but Frank and Beans makes things difficult as the days go by.
12	3	"Catch Me If You Sam"	Kiran Sangherra	Nicole Belisle	December 7, 2021
12	3	"Toy Driver"	Kiran Sangherra	Matt Smith	December 7, 2021
Catch Me If You Sam: On Tag's first day as a race cadet, she tries to break the rules to win, but learns a lesson when her actions rack up guilt and almost cause harm. Toy Driver: When Maw accidentally donates Tag's old toys to some puppies, Tag sets out to get them back—but soon learns an important lesson about empathy, sharing, and thinking about others' feelings.
13	4	"Frank and Beans with Chili"	Kiran Sangherra	Brittany Ashley	December 7, 2021
13	4	"Little Hound on the Prairie"	Kiran Sangherra	Brittany Ashley	December 7, 2021
Frank and Beans with Chili: Beans feels left out when his stunt-dog cousin, Chili, comes to town and spends time with Frank, and is determined to get his best friend back, but soon takes some questionable risks doing so. Little Hound on the Prairie: Tag learns all about her ancestors, and how they named - and built - the town of Pawston 100 years in the past.
14	5	"Chaser and Chewer"	Andrew Duncan	Adam Peltzman	December 7, 2021
14	5	"Recipe for Adventure"	Andrew Duncan	Adam Peltzman	December 7, 2021
Chaser and Chewer: Tag and Scooch plays Superheroes while waiting for their next issue, but they have to stop Frank and Beans as the bad guy. Recipe for Adventure: Tag tries to gather ingredients for a famous family recipe for some delicious cookies (which have never been made successfully in the past), but he finds that they may be biting off more than he can chew.
15	6	"Raiders of the Lost Bark"	Andrew Duncan	Nicole Belisle	December 7, 2021
15	6	"Slow Dog Slow"	Andrew Duncan	Nicole Belisle	December 7, 2021
Raiders of the Lost Bark: Gilber finds an ancient golden slipper, but despite his warnings Tag and Scooch touch it and it breaks, and go on an adventure to find the other one, before Gilber figures out the truth. Slow Dog Slow: The Race Cadets pair up with senior dogs they have to take care of them on a relaxing day, but Tag and Scooch's senior is anything but relaxing. In fact, he is still full of youthful energy and refuses to sit around or go slow.
16	7	"Board Silly"	Kiran Sangherra	Matt Smith	December 7, 2021
16	7	"Sing for the Fences"	Kiran Sangherra	Matt Smith	December 7, 2021
Board Silly: Tag and her friends turn the streets of Pawston into an interactive board game, but Frank and Beans keep cheating, wanting to win more than have fun. Sing for the Fences: The dogs compete to write an anthem for pop star Kelly Korgi to sing at the town's anniversary bash, but they have a tough competition.
17	8	"Fast Frank's Fixit"	Kiran Sangherra	Lucas Mills	December 7, 2021
17	8	"Tail-kwondo"	Kiran Sangherra	Lucas Mills	December 7, 2021
Fast Frank's Fixit: The Pawtomotive Garage (the Barker family's garage) has some competition when Frank builds a new car fixing shop nearby in an effort to get treats. Frank, however, has a problem when his fixes focus on efficiency rather than quality, and the cars he repairs fall apart not long after. Tail-kwondo: The mysterious Master Wag invites Scooch to train at his secret cave to help him become a Tail-kwondo master, but Tag first tries a method that doesn't involve the typical training régime.
18	9	"Happy Birthday Pawston"	Kiran Sangherra	Matt Smith & Mark Banker	December 7, 2021
As Pawston prepares for its big 100th anniversary bash, Tag and Scooch race against the clock to make sure everything is ready, while Tag worries whether Kelly Korgi will arrive in time to perform.

=== Season 3 (2022) ===
No. overall	No. in season	Title	Directed by	Written by	Original release date
19	1	"Big Dog Job"	Kiran Sangherra	Adam Peltzman	September 19, 2022
19	1	"The Case of the Slobbery"	Kiran Sangherra	Adam Peltzman	September 19, 2022
Big Dog Job: While Maw is out on an emergency blimp delivery, Tag takes on a "big dog" job, which is a puppy-sitting Yip and her cousin Rhonda by getting them to the playground. When the two little pups wander off, Tag finds herself in a whirlwind of chaos as she races to round them up across Pawston. The Case of the Slobbery: A giant, bone-shaped ride goes missing at the Amusement Bark, and Tag and Scooch are on the case.
20	2	"Tag Team"	Andrew Duncan	Matt Smith	September 19, 2022
20	2	"Cattitude Adjustment"	Andrew Duncan	Matt Smith	September 19, 2022
Tag Team: Tag builds a robot to help Mayor Sniffington spruce up the town, but Frank and Beans steal the robot, which ends up wreaking havoc in Pawston. Cattitude Adjustment: When Pawston's new fire chief turns out to be a cat, the dogs roll out the welcome mat. With Tag and Scooch helping Beans, they plan a big welcome party and learn that friendship can cross even the biggest differences.
21	3	"Hocus Focus"	Andrew Duncan	Nicole Belisle	September 19, 2022
21	3	"Furricane"	Andrew Duncan	Nicole Belisle	September 19, 2022
Hocus Focus: Scooch discovers he has a gift for magic, but it doesn't come easy for Tag. Furricane: A storm threatens Pawston's town picnic, so Tag and Spike try to "vanish" the furricane, but Tag has a fear of vacuums.
22	4	"Mom for a Day"	Kiran Sangherra	Brittany Ashley	September 19, 2022
22	4	"Kitty in the City"	Kiran Sangherra	Brittany Ashley	September 19, 2022
Mom for a Day: When Maw comes down sick, Tag volunteers to take on all her jobs for the day. From fixing a leaky faucet, sweeping up fur, and feeding Yip to helping Cheddar Biscuit and Gilber and even making a salad, Tag quickly learns that it is harder than it looks. With Maw's advice to do "one thing at a time", Tag discovers how to manage it all. Kitty in the City: Tag and Scooch join newcomer Kit for a day of cat-tivities, while Frank and Beans try to figure out who she really is.
23	5	"The Itch to Switch"	Shawn Gulley	Matt Smith	September 19, 2022
23	5	"Mismatched Socks"	Andrew Duncan	Matt Smith	September 19, 2022
The Itch to Switch: Tag and Scooch decide to trade houses for a day, curious about what it would be like to live in each other's homes. At first, it is exciting as they explore each other's families and routines, but as the day goes on, both Tag and Scooch start to miss their own families, realizing that while their best friend's home is fun, there is no place like their own. Mismatched Socks: The Pawston Get Sox fetch team is adding two new mascots and Frank and Beans are the perfect match.
24	6	"New Hat, New Tag!"	Andrew Duncan	Nicole Belisle	September 19, 2022
24	6	"Furry-Tail Ending"	Andrew Duncan	Nicole Belisle	September 19, 2022
New Hat, New Tag!: With Lady Lydia's help, Tag tries on hats to figure out what type of dog she is meant to be. Furry-Tail Ending: Sergeant Pooch starts reading Scooch, Tag and Kit a story, but the end is missing, and the trio must think of an ending.
25	7	"Bigpaw, Big Problem"	Kiran Sangherra	Lucas Mills	September 19, 2022
25	7	"Captain Scooch and Scally-Tag"	Kiran Sangherra	Lucas Mills	September 19, 2022
Bigpaw, Big Problem: Bigpaw has apparently been seen in Pawston and Tag goes to investigate this case. Captain Scooch and Scally-Tag: Tag struggles to take orders when Scooch plays captain for a pirate-themed race.
26	8	"The Pawston Chewbilee"	Andrew Duncan	Nicole Belisle	September 19, 2022
26	8	"Don't Go, Cat. Go!"	Andrew Duncan	Nicole Belisle	September 19, 2022
The Pawston Chewbilee: Tag and Kit are excited to compete in the Chewbilee Games, hoping to win and lead the parade to the Party Tree. When Dale Mation returns to Pawston after having her puppies, Tom shares unexpected news with Kit — their family will be moving back the very next day. This leaves Kit torn between the big celebration and the sudden change ahead. Don't Go, Cat. Go!: Kit learns she has to move back to Meowbuquerque, but she isn't ready to say goodbye to Tag and Scooch, who are already planning a big farewell party for her. Feeling overwhelmed, the three friends decide to slip away to the Party Tree so they can enjoy one more adventure together before Kit's move, leading to an emotional day of fun, honesty, and important decisions.

=== Season 4 (2023) ===
No. overall	No. in season	Title	Directed by	Written by	Original release date
27	1	"Tails in the Seats"	Shawn Gulley	Peri Segel	November 27, 2023
27	1	"Roadside Distraction"	Shawn Gulley	Mark De Angelis	November 27, 2023
Tails in the Seats: Sam Whippet needs to fill every seat in the Speedway so he can win his rematch, so Tag decides to help. Roadside Distraction: Kelly Korgi hosts a contest to find the best roadside attraction.
28	2	"Tough Cookies"	Katrina Hadley	Peri Segel	November 27, 2023
28	2	"More Than Meets the Tie"	Katrina Hadley	Marty Johnson	November 27, 2023
Tough Cookies: Sam Whippet challenges the race cadets to deliver his cookie boxes as fast as they can. More Than Meets the Tie: Just before Yip's birthday party, Muttfield the Magnificent mysteriously disappears. With the big magic show about to start, Tag and Scooch must race against time to find him before it is too late and the party is ruined.
29	3	"Tail to the Chief"	Shawn Gulley	Adam Peltzman	November 27, 2023
29	3	"Chaser and Chewer: Part Chew"	Shawn Gulley	Mark De Angelis	November 27, 2023
Tail to the Chief: Tag takes over running Pawston so Mayor Sniffington can take a day off. Chaser and Chewer: Part Chew: Thunder and Flea kidnap Scooch's stuffed chicken, Cluckles, and Chaser and Chewer must get it back, with a new recruit.
30	4	"The Puppy Whisperer"	Katrina Hadley	Peri Segel	November 27, 2023
30	4	"Doggy Book of World Records"	Katrina Hadley	Marty Johnson	November 27, 2023
The Puppy Whisperer: When Beans offers to babysit Yip, Tag has a hard time getting her baby brother back. Doggy Book of World Records: Tag and Scooch try to get into the "Doggy Book of World Records".
31	5	"The Pawmazing Race"	Katrina Hadley	Mark De Angelis & Adam Peltzman	November 27, 2023
Tag enters the Barkers in their favorite TV game show, The Pawmazing Race, determined to win, while Maw, Paw, Yip, Cheddar Biscuit, and Gilber just want to have fun. Hosted by Kelly Korgi, the race is full of chaos, laughs, and family teamwork.
32	6	"Bridge to Meowbuquerque"	Shawn Gulley	Marty Johnson	November 27, 2023
32	6	"No Part Harmony"	Shawn Gulley	Adam Peltzman	November 27, 2023
Bridge to Meowbuquerque: Tag must figure out a way across the river so her cat friends can celebrate Yarn Ball Day, but Kit and her friends are afraid of water. No Part Harmony: When the Barkapellas won't perform without their missing ties, Tag saves the concert by making new ones, while Maw Barker and Scooch's mom cheer from the audience.
33	7	"Happy Pawtomotiversary"	Shawn Gulley	Peri Segel	November 27, 2023
33	7	"Winner, Winner, Lasagna Dinner"	Shawn Gulley	Marty Johnson	November 27, 2023
Happy Pawtomotivesary: Tag plans a special surprise for her grandparents by recreating an old photo of their beloved garage. With Paw's help, she sets out to find and bring back all the old stuff from the past, but things don't go quite as smoothly as planned. Winner, Winner, Lasagna Dinner: Wind and Tag compete in lasagna challenges to become Sam's new crew chief.
34	8	"Bites, Camera, Action!"	Katrina Hadley	Mark De Angelis	November 27, 2023
34	8	"Stay, Dog. Stay!"	Katrina Hadley	Adam Peltzman	November 27, 2023
Bites, Camera, Action!: Tag makes a movie to help Pawston win the chance to host the Dogcathalon. Stay, Dog. Stay!: After Frank and Beans’ treehouse crashes during a storm, they are forced to stay at the Barkers' house. Tag rushes to fix their damaged roof before the rain gets worse—and before her brother, Spike, arrives to check on his own important project.
35	9	"Whatever It Cakes"	Shawn Gulley	Marty Johnson	November 27, 2023
35	9	"Haturday"	Shawn Gulley	Peri Segel	November 27, 2023
Whatever It Cakes: Scooch needs help transporting a cake to Chew York City for his favorite cooking show. Haturday: Tag searches all over town for Lady Lydia's missing hat feathers.
36	10	"Trick or Thief"	Katrina Hadley	Ana Sani	November 27, 2023
36	10	"Meow-Lo-Ween"	Katrina Hadley	Saurin Choksi	November 27, 2023
Trick or Thief: On Howl-oween, Tag and Scooch investigate the case of the missing pup-clairs. Meow-Lo-Ween: Tag assembles a team of Howl-oween experts to put on a parade in Meowbuquerque.
37	11	"The Trouble with Kibbles"	Shawn Gulley	Mark De Angelis	November 27, 2023
37	11	"Road to Kindness"	Shawn Gulley	Peri Segel	November 27, 2023
The Trouble with Kibbles: Maw recounts the exciting day she saved the entire city of Pawston from a massive kibble disaster by flying a blimp. As she struggled to learn how to press the right buttons and control the blimp, Maw had to think fast, stay brave, and succeed, especially since she needed the win to qualify for the Dogcathalon. Road to Kindness: Frank enrolls in a kindness class so he can attend Roller Disco Night.
38	12	"How Tag Got Her Tag"	Katrina Hadley	Adam Peltzman	November 27, 2023
38	12	"Blankie Blaster"	Katrina Hadley	Marty Johnson	November 27, 2023
How Tag Got Her Tag: The Barkers recount the story of how Tag got her race flag tag as a puppy when her idol, Sam Whippet, saved her from her runaway makeshift car. Blankie Blaster: Tag promises Spike that she will deliver his special blankie before his important space mission. When things don't go as planned, Tag teams up with Grandpaw and Grandmaw, and together they race against time to save the day and make sure Spike doesn't blast off without it.
39	13	"Chaser and Chewer: Part Flea"	Shawn Gulley	Peri Segel	November 27, 2023
39	13	"Sing for Your Pupper"	Shawn Gulley	Marty Johnson	November 27, 2023
Chaser and Chewer: Part Flea: In the final part of "Chaser and Chewer", Flea plans to do "bad guy" stuff all over town, but not if Chaser, Chewer and Thunder can stop him. Sing for Your Pupper: Wagnes auditions for Pupsy Cline's world tour.
40	14	"Dogcathalon"	Katrina Hadley	Mark De Angelis	November 27, 2023
In the series finale, When Pawston is chosen to host the legendary Dogcathalon, Tag steps up as crew chief, leading her friends and family in preparing for the big event—and bringing the series to a joyful, heartfelt finale filled with teamwork, racing, and Pawston pride.

== Production ==
Go, Dog. Go! was first announced back in 2019 as part of seven Netflix Original Preschool shows targeted at 2-6 year olds. The series was originally scheduled to be released December 22, 2020, but was delayed until January 26, 2021. The first and second season consist of nine episodes with the third season of eight episodes and the fourth season of fourteen episodes, each 24 minutes in length. All episodes featured 2 11-12 minute stories, though episodes 6, 9, 18, 31 and 40 are 2-parters and episode 10 is a full length episode.

== Music ==
The series soundtrack is composed by Paul Buckley.

== Release ==
Go, Dog. Go! premiered on January 26, 2021, globally on Netflix. A trailer was released on January 6, along with an array of teaser clips released by different publications.

== Reception ==
=== Critical reception ===
Common Sense Media, in their review, gave the series 4 out of 5 stars, and the disclaimer: "Dog adventures with oodles of preschool laughs".

=== Accolades ===
Year	Award	Category	Nominee(s)	Result	Ref.
2021	Leo Awards	Best Direction Animation Series	Andrew Duncan and Kiran Shangherra (for "Clucky Day / Take Me Out To The Fetch Game")	Nominated	
2022	ACTRA Award	Outstanding Performance – Gender Non-Conforming or Male Voice	Joshua Graham as Sam Whippet (for "Dog The Right Thing")	Won	
2022	ACTRA Award	Outstanding Performance – Gender Non-Conforming or Male Voice	Anand Rajaram as Beans (for "Clucky Day / Take Me Out To The Fetch Game")	Nominated	
2022	Canadian Screen Awards	Best Animated Program or Series	Go, Dog, Go!	Nominated	
