= Go, Dog. Go! =

1961 American children's picture book about dogs by P. D. Eastman

- Author: P. D. Eastman
- Illustrator: P. D. Eastman
- Series: Beginner Books
- Genre: Children's
- Publisher: Random House Books for Young Readers
- Publication date: March 12, 1961 (renewed in 1989)
- ISBN: 0-394-80020-6
- OCLC: 25029028

Go, Dog. Go! is a 1961 children's book written and illustrated by P. D. Eastman. It describes the actions and interactions of a group of highly mobile dogs, who operate cars and other conveyances in pursuit of work, play, and a final mysterious goal: a dog party.

== Plot ==
The dogs featured in the book use their cars to help them get their work done and get to places. Throughout the book, details in Eastman's illustrations seem to invite the reader to notice the deeper significance of small things. The book introduces concepts such as color and relative position with simple language and humor, and involves actions such as playing, working, going up, going down.

=== Recurring hat conversation ===
In a recurring interaction throughout Go, Dog. Go!, a pink poodle asks "Do you like my hat?" and yellow hound says he does not, and they part ways. In the pair's first appearance, the poodle wears a hat that features a flower. The hound does not like it. Several pages later, the dogs meet again while riding scooters, and the poodle wears a hat adorned with a feather. The hound does not like her hat, but as they part, he steals the feather. When they are next seen together, the dogs are skiing. The hound does not like the poodle's long ski cap, and she skis away. In their final meeting, her hat — now even more elaborate — meets the approval of the yellow dog. "The hats themselves get more and more ostentatious, so he obviously has outer tastes", according to the book I Can Read it All By Myself. In this way, a relationship development is shown in simple text. The conclusion is elusive, but at the end all the dogs have a wild party.

== Publication ==
Following its success in publishing The Cat in the Hat in 1957, Random House launched the imprint Beginner Books the following year for early reader books. P. D. Eastman published Are You My Mother? with Beginner Books in 1960, followed by Go, Dog. Go! in 1961.

== Reception and legacy ==
The children's book author Jon Scieszka, known for The Time Warp Trio and The True Story of the 3 Little Pigs!, described Go, Dog. Go! as "the truest book I have ever read". He wrote that Dick and Jane books bored him, but Go, Dog. Go! "rocked my first-grade world".

Go, Dog. Go! has been compared to works by Dr. Seuss for its short declarative sentences and "sense of manic energy". The actress Jamie Lee Curtis described the recurring interaction between the hat-wearing poodle and the disapproving yellow hound as "one of the funniest non sequiturs in all literature", and wrote that the scene "made me laugh then and makes me laugh now as I am writing this".

== Adaptations ==
- In 2003, a musical version of the book was developed by Steven Dietz and Allison Gregory for the Seattle Children's Theatre. The play has been widely staged throughout the U.S., often as an introduction to theater for young children.
- A CGI television series based on the book and produced by DreamWorks Animation and WildBrain Studios premiered on Netflix in 2021.
