= Barbapapa =

1970 French children's picture book and its franchise

- Cover of hardbound edition of Barbapapa, ISBN 2-87881-230-1
- Authors: Annette Tison and Talus Taylor
- Language: French
- Genre: Children's literature
- Published: 19 May 1970
- Publisher: L'École des Loisirs
- OCLC: 225805
- Dewey Decimal: 823.91
- LC Class: PZ7.T518
- Website: www.barbapapa.com

Barbapapa is a 1970 children's picture book by the French-American couple Annette Tison and Talus Taylor, who lived in Paris, France. Barbapapa is both the title character and the name of his "species". The book was the first of a series of children's books originally written in French and later translated into over 30 languages.

Barbe à papa – literally "Daddy's beard" – is French for cotton candy or candy floss.

== Background ==
The inspiration for Barbapapa came by chance in the Luxembourg Garden in Paris one day in May 1970. While walking in the park with Annette Tison, Talus Taylor thought he heard a child ask his parents for something called "Baa baa baa baa". Not speaking French, he asked Tison what the words meant. She explained that the child was asking for a treat called Barbe à papa (cotton candy, literally 'daddy's beard'). Later at a restaurant, the couple began to draw on the tablecloth and came up with a character inspired by the candy: a pink and round character. When it came time to give it a name, Barbapapa came naturally.

Several European publishers expressed interest in Barbapapa but did not wish to pay the publishing cost. Frank Fehmers, a Dutch publisher, subsequently set up a co-production, and the first editions were published in 1970. The original editions were published in French by L'École des Loisirs, in Dutch by Frank Fehmers Productions, in British English by the Ernest Benn Company, and in American English by the Henry Z. Walck Co.

== Characters ==
The main characters in the books are the Barbapapa family, who are most notable for their ability to shapeshift at will. In their native form, Barbapapas are blob-shaped, with a distinct head and arms, but no legs. Male Barbapapas have rounder bottoms, whereas female Barbapapas have a more slender form. Each Barbapapa can adopt any form they choose, but they remain easily identifiable by always retaining their faces and their distinctive colour.

Barbapapa himself is a generally papaya-shaped, pink shapeshifting blob-like creature who grows from the ground and tries to fit in the human world. The shapeshifting is usually accompanied by the saying "Clickety Click—Barba Trick", or in the 1970s British dub "All Change!"

After various adventures, Barbapapa comes across a female of his species (more shapely, and black-coloured), named Barbamama. They produce seven children: four sons – Barbabravo, a sports fan (red), Barbabright, a scientist (blue), Barbazoo, a nature enthusiast (yellow) and Barbabeau, a painter (black and furry) – as well as three daughters: Barbalala, a musician (green), Barbabelle, a narcissistic beauty queen (purple), and Barbalib, an intellectual (orange).

== Adaptations ==
=== Television ===
A few years after the book's initial publication, and when more titles had been published, Fehmers expanded the project to television films in conjunction with Joop Visch of Polyscope-PolyGram and Japanese animation studio Topcraft Limited Company, with the storyboards designed by Taylor. After twelve years, Fehmers and Tison/Taylor discontinued their business relationship. The first animated series, simply titled Barbapapa (バーバパパ, Baabapapa), aired on French, British and Dutch TV in 1974, and premiered in Japan three years later, in 1977. One hundred five minute-long episodes, spanning two seasons, were produced and aired on television.

In 1999, another animated series called Barbapapa Around the World (バーバパパ 世界をまわる, Baabapapa Sekai o Mawaru) was produced and aired in Japan. Animated by Studio Pierrot and produced by Kodansha, the series depicted the family travelling to different countries around the world. The series aired over 50 episodes.

In 2019, a new animated series, called Barbapapa: One Big Happy Family!, was produced by Normaal Animation. It currently airs on TF1 in France and Yle TV2 in Finland. In other countries including Poland, the show is aired on Nick Jr. The show was written by Alice Taylor and Thomas Taylor. Alice is the daughter of Tison and Taylor. The English dub was produced by Jungle Studios in the United Kingdom and features a cast of up-and-coming child actors.

=== Episodes ===
==== Season 1 ====
1. La naissance
2. Le feu (Episode)
3. La plage
4. En route (Episode)
5. La mer (Episode)
6. L'Indie
7. L'Amérique (Episode)
8. Barbamama
9. Le port
10. Le château
11. Problème de maison
12. Maison de Barbapapa
13. Le petit train
14. Le désert (Episode)
15. Les œufs
16. Les beaux-arts
17. Le sport
18. Baby-sitter (Episode)
19. Le microscope
20. Chef de gare
21. La poterie
22. La valise
23. L'Afrique
24. La torte des moutons
25. Le tissage
26. Le taureau
27. Le biberon
28. La métamorphose
29. La coiffure
30. Le ski
31. La forêt (Episode)
32. Le pique-nique
33. La régate
34. Les puces
35. Les vendanges
36. Les insectes
37. La machine (Episode)
38. Photos de mode
39. Le concert (Episode)
40. L'anniversaire
41. L'alpiniste
42. Pollution (Episode)
43. La chasse
44. Le sauvetage
45. Retour sur Terre

==== Season 2 ====
1. La tirelire
2. Matador
3. Mexique
4. Le piège
5. Le repas de bébé
6. Le cirque
7. Docteur Barbidou
8. Le facteur
9. Anniversaire de bébé
10. Les animaux mystérieux
11. La jambe cassée
12. Le terrain de jeux
13. Les jouets
14. Le voleur mystérieux
15. Le robot
16. Le safari
17. Sauvons les baleines
18. Cache-Cache
19. Bataille de saloon
20. Mystère de la tarte
21. Mystère des œufs
22. L'auto
23. Buffalo Bill
24. Le dinosaure
25. La disparition de Barbapapa
26. Ecole en plein air
27. Exposition canine
28. Noël

=== Music ===
The first Barbapapa theme's lyrics were written by Harrie Geelen, and the music composed by Joop Stokkermans.

The Japanese version of the series, as aired on NET (currently: TV Asahi), features an entirely different theme song from the original series, composed by Chuuji Kinoshita with lyrics by Zenzo Matsuyama. The Italian version's song was sung by singer-songwriter Roberto Vecchioni.

The Spanish kids' group Parchis made a song about the characters of the cartoon, named "Barbapapá".

An Hebrew song named "Barba'aba" (ברבאבא) was written by Yoram Taharlev and performed by Tzipi Shavit in 1978. It talks about Barbapapa being shunned by everyone for looking weird until he met Barbamama. The song became a kids' classic.

=== Comic book ===
A comic book version was also created. Both cartoons and comics sometimes show concerns about the environment and contain environmental messages.

== Legacy ==
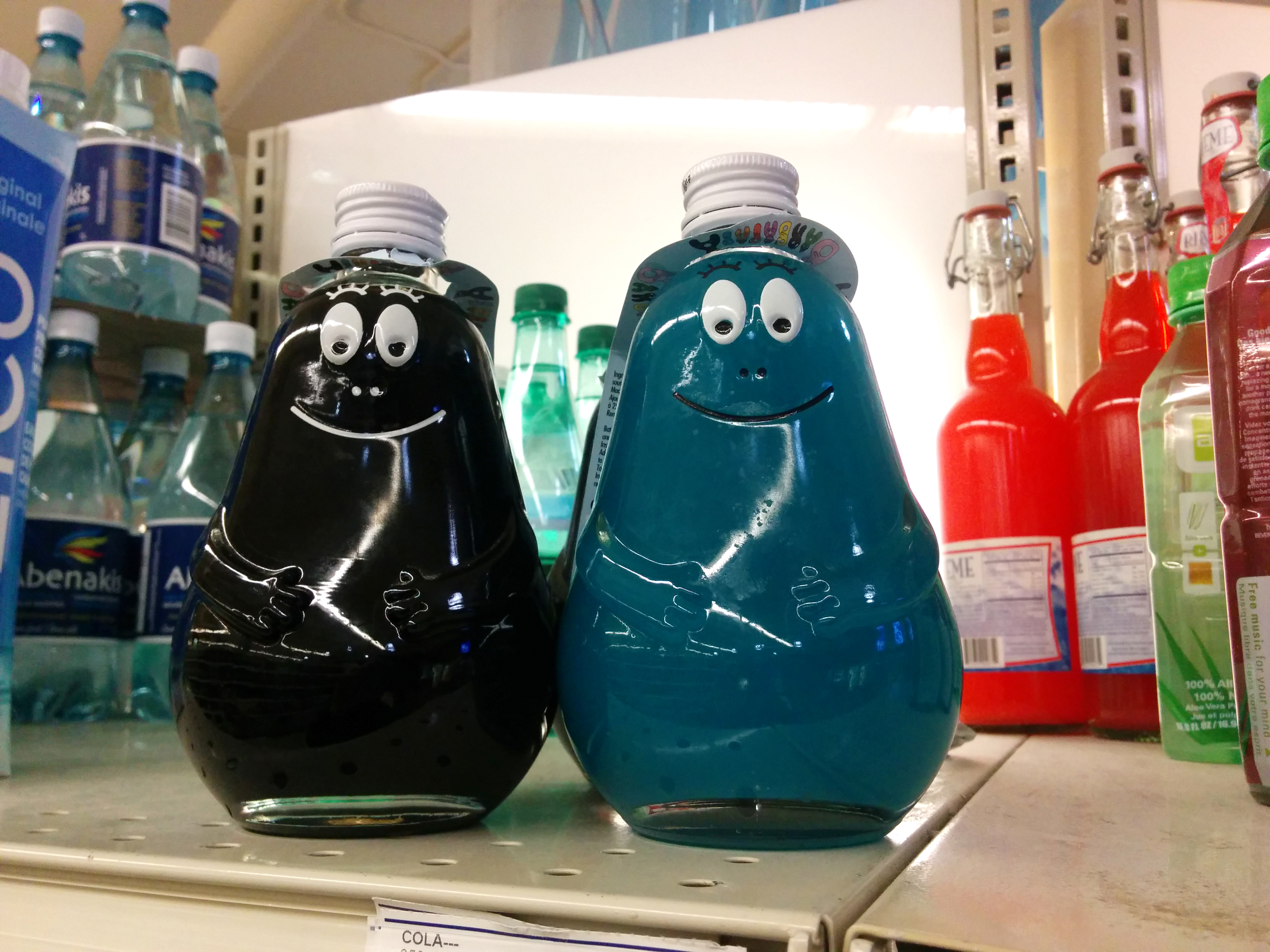
Barbapapa drinks

The Barbapapa cartoon is popular in many countries worldwide and has been dubbed into a wide variety of languages, including five separate English dubs. In the United States, it was syndicated on various networks throughout the 1970s with a dub by Magno Sound and Video in New York. The original series continues to air to this day on television in France, Italy and El Salvador and Barbapapa merchandise is still produced in France and Japan.

Google created a doodle celebrating the 45th anniversary of the publishing of Barbapapa on May 19, 2015. It also served as a tribute to Talus Taylor.
