= Sam and the Firefly =

1958 children's book by P. D. Eastman

First edition (publ. Random House)

Sam and the Firefly is a children's book by P. D. Eastman. It was written and illustrated in 1958.

== Plot ==
An owl named Sam awakens one night and looks for a playmate, but since it is the middle of the night, all the other animals are asleep. Sam then comes across a series of flying lights, one of which hits Sam in the head, which is a firefly named Gus, who shows Sam the trick about glowing lines in midair using his light. Sam is amazed and decides to have fun by having Gus follow him directly as he flies. Sam flies in the shape of several words; Gus finds this fun and decides to do more on his own, but he has mischief on his mind.

First, he causes several cars to crash at an intersection by displaying "Go fast", "Go slow", "Go right", "Go left" above. Sam wants to talk to him about this behavior, that it is dangerous and bad, but Gus abandons Sam as he thinks Sam does not know how to have fun. Gus then continues to cause mischief; he causes several airplanes to get crossed up by displaying "Go up", "Go down", "Go this way", and "Go that way", then causes a crowd to occur at a movie theater by displaying "Come in! Free Show" above it, and he then changes a sign of a hot dog stand from "Hot Dogs" to "Cold Hot Dogs". This action attracts the attention of the hot dog stand's customers and the hot dog man, which makes them mad. The customers tell Gus that they want their hot dogs hot and not cold. The hot dog man grabs a net and a jar and runs to Sam and Gus. He then vows to catch the firefly and take him away (in order to prevent any other dangerous acts by playing another trick on him and his hot dog stand customers again). He immediately catches Gus in his net, traps him in a jar, and puts it into his pickup truck. Sam sees this and is determined to save him.

Gus regrets disobeying Sam's warnings about having too much fun. The aforementioned pickup truck stalls on a railroad crossing with a train coming. Sam then breaks the jar containing Gus, which lets him out. Now free, Gus displays the word "STOP" several times in large letters. The locomotive's engineer sees Gus' messages and the truck on the tracks. The engineer applies the brake and stops the train just in time. The hot dog maker and the engineer and brakeman all cheer for Gus, and Gus and Sam fly off into the night. At dawn, Sam and Gus must go back to their homes to sleep, since they are both nocturnal, but Gus continues to visit Sam's tree home every night to play.
