= Are You My Mother? =

1960 children's book by P. D. Eastman

- Author: P. D. Eastman
- Illustrator: P. D. Eastman
- Cover artist: Eastman
- Language: English
- Genre: Children's book
- Publisher: Random House
- Publication date: June 12, 1960 (renewed in 1988)
- Publication place: United States

Are You My Mother? is a children's book written and illustrated by P. D. Eastman. It was published by Random House Books for Young Readers on June 12, 1960, as part of its Beginner Books series, which caters to young children.

Based on a 2007 online poll, the National Education Association listed the book as one of its "Teachers' Top 100 Books for Children". It was one of the "Top 100 Picture Books" of all time in a 2012 poll by School Library Journal.

== Plot summary ==
Are You My Mother? is a story about a hatchling bird. His mother, thinking her egg will stay in her nest where she left it, leaves it alone and flies off to find food. The baby bird hatches while the mother is away. The hatchling does not understand where his mother is, so he goes looking for her. While he cannot yet fly, he walks, and in his search, he asks a kitten (who says nothing), a hen, a dog, and a cow if they are his mother, but none of them are.

Unable to give up, he runs instead of walking when he sees an old car, which he realizes certainly cannot be his mother. In desperation, the hatchling calls out to a boat, and then an airplane (but neither respond), and at last, he approaches and climbs onto the teeth of an enormous steam shovel calling to it "Mother, Mother! Here I am, Mother!". After it belches "SNORT" from its exhaust stack, however, the bird, realizes that the steam shovel was not his mother after all, says it is "a snort" and tries to escape, but the machine shudders and grinds into motion. The hatchling is put into danger and cries out for his mother quickly.

At that moment, the steam shovel drops the hatchling into his nest, and his mother returns. The two are reunited, much to their delight, and the baby bird recounts to his mother the adventures he had looking for her, saying that she is not any animal or vehicle but a bird.

== Adaptations ==
The regular version has 64 pages. An abridged and simplified 24-page board book has also been published by Random House.

In August 1991, Are You My Mother? was part of the Beginner Book Video series, directed and produced by Ray Messecar. The cast included Ardys Flavelle, Merwin Goldsmith, Marian Hailey, Ron Marshall, Brendon Parry and Jim Thurman.

ArtsPower National Touring Theatre created an hour-long musical performance based on the book geared for children grades K-2, with music by Richard DeRosa.

== Critical reaction ==
Based on a 2007 online poll, the National Education Association listed the book as one of its "Teachers' Top 100 Books for Children". It was one of the "Top 100 Picture Books" of all time in a 2012 poll by School Library Journal.

Family law professor Elizabeth Bartholet criticized the book for promoting what she described as an "anti-adoption" point of view. Her colleague Barbara Bennett Woodhouse disagreed, saying that it represented a more nuanced view that children need parenthood of any form but that there are benefits in maintaining connections with their biological origins. Economics professor David A. Anderson and psychology professor Mykol Hamilton cited Are You My Mother? as an example of children's literature that reinforces cultural marginalization of fatherhood. Barbara Sands Worth and education professor Dorothy S. Strickland describe Are You My Mother? as a "longtime children's favorite" that allows children to safely identify with a childlike, trouble-making character because the character is an anthropomorphic animal.

Cartoonist Alison Bechdel titled her memoir Are You My Mother? in reference to Eastman's book, invoking her own search for a maternal figure.

== See also ==
- Imprinting (psychology)
