= Talus Taylor =

American writer (1929–2015)

- Born: September 18, 1929; New York City, U.S.
- Died: February 15, 2015 (aged 85); Paris, France
- Occupations: Writer, teacher
- Notable work: Barbapapa
- Spouse: Annette Tison (died 2010)

Talus Taylor (September 18, 1929 – February 15, 2015) was an American writer of children's literature, best known for being the co-creator with his wife Annette Tison of the Barbapapa series. Initially published as an album in 1970, the series became a cartoon and a magazine in 1976.

Taylor was born in New York City and died in Paris at the age of 85.
