= Annette Tison =

French architect and writer

- Born: December 27, 1942; Hossegor, France
- Died: June 28, 2010 (aged 67); Paris, France
- Education: École Spéciale d'Architecture
- Occupations: Architect, author
- Notable work: Barbapapa
- Spouse: Talus Taylor

Annette Tison (December 27, 1942 – June 28, 2010) was a French architect and writer, mainly known for being co-creator of the Barbapapa series with her American husband, Talus Taylor.

Tison graduated from the École Spéciale d'Architecture. She co-created the characters of the Barbapapa, which was initially published as an album in 1970, before becoming a cartoon and a magazine in 1976.
