= P. D. Eastman =

American writer and illustrator (1909–1986)

- Eastman in 1972
- Born: Philip Dey Eastman; November 25, 1909; Amherst, Massachusetts, U.S.
- Died: January 7, 1986 (aged 76); Cresskill, New Jersey, U.S.
- Occupations: Writer, illustrator, storyboard artist
- Spouse: Mary Louise Whitham
- Writing career
- Years active: 1936–1986
- Genre: Children's literature
- Notable works: Go, Dog. Go!; Are You My Mother?
- Website: www.pdeastmanbooks.com

Philip Dey Eastman (November 25, 1909 – January 7, 1986) was an American screenwriter, children's author, and illustrator.

== Early life ==
P.D. Eastman was born in Amherst, Massachusetts, to Clarence Willis and Anne Hull (Dey) Eastman. After studying at Phillips Academy Andover and Williston Academy, he graduated from Amherst College in 1933 and later from the National Academy of Design in New York City.

== Career ==
=== Film and animation ===
From 1936 to 1941, Eastman worked at Walt Disney Productions in assistant animation, story-sketch, and production design. From 1941 to 1942, he worked in the story department of Leon Schlesinger Productions, Warner Bros.'s cartoon unit, and was a member of Local Number Eight Hundred And Thirty-Nine of Motion Picture Screen Cartoonists, the trade union representing cartoonists in the United States.

In 1942, Eastman was drafted by the Army and assigned to the Signal Corps film unit, which was headed by Theodor Geisel, who later became known as Dr. Seuss. Here, Eastman conducted picture planning for animated sequences in orientation and training films, and he also wrote scripts and drew storyboards for the Private Snafu series for Army-Navy Screen Magazine.

From 1945 to 1952, Eastman worked at United Productions of America (UPA). He was a writer and storyboard artist for the Mr. Magoo series. Eastman and Bill Scott co-wrote the screenplay for the animated comedy Gerald McBoing-Boing, which won an Academy Award for Short Subject, Cartoons, in 1950. Eastman also directed educational films and worked on the Flight Safety series for the United States Navy's Bureau of Aeronautics while at UPA.

=== Author and illustrator ===
Eastman, a protégé and colleague of Theodor Geisel (pen name Dr. Seuss), wrote many books for children in his own distinct style. He worked with the Dr. Seuss brand of Random House, many of which were in the Beginner Books series. His titles include:

- Are You My Mother? (ISBN 0-394-80018-4) (Beginner Book #18) (written and illustrated by)
- Go, Dog. Go! (ISBN 0-394-80020-6) (Beginner Book #20)
- The Best Nest (ISBN 0-394-80051-6) (Beginner Book #51) (written and illustrated by)
- Flap Your Wings (ISBN 0-375-80243-6) (Early Bird Book, later reissued as Random House Pictureback Book formerly and Beginner Book #88 currently)
- The Cat in the Hat Beginner Book Dictionary (ISBN 0-394-81009-0) (Beginner Book)
- What Time Is It? (ISBN 0-375-81362-4) (Bright and Early Board Books) - currently only available as an ebook
- Sam and the Firefly (ISBN 0-394-80006-0) (Beginner Book #6) (written and illustrated by)
- Big Dog...Little Dog (ISBN 0-375-82297-6), 30th anniversary edition with additional story, words and illustrations by Peter Anthony Eastman (Beginner Book #92)
- Red, Stop! Green, Go! (ISBN 0-375-82503-7) (Bright and Early Playtime Book)
- Sam and Gus Light Up The Night (ISBN 0-375-82926-1) (Bright and Early Playtime Book)
- My Nest Is Best (ISBN 0-375-83267-X) (Bright and Early Playtime Book)
- The Alphabet Book (ISBN 978-0-553-51111-6) (Random House Pictureback Book, later Bright and Early Book #41 (ISBN 0-375-80603-2) with additional materials by Tony Eastman from the Bright and Early Board Book edition)
- Are You My Mother? (ISBN 0-679-89047-5) (Bright and Early Board Book, later reissued as Big Bright and Early Board Book)
- Big Dog...Little Dog: A Bedtime Story (ISBN 0-394-83312-0) (Random House Pictureback Book)
- Big Dog...Little Dog (ISBN 0-375-87539-5) (Bright and Early Board Book with additional materials by Peter Anthony Eastman)
- Aaron is a Good Sport (ISBN 978-0-553-50842-0) (Step into Reading level 1) adapted from Everything Happens to Aaron in the Spring (Take Along Books)
- Aaron Has a Lazy Day (ISBN 978-0-553-50844-4) (Step into Reading level 1) adapted from Everything Happens to Aaron in the Summer (Take Along Books)
- Aaron Loves Apples and Pumpkins (ISBN 978-0-553-51234-2) (Step into Reading level 1) adapted from Everything Happens to Aaron in the Autumn (Take Along Books)
- Aaron is Cool (ISBN 978-0-553-51237-3) (Step into Reading level 1) adapted from Everything Happens to Aaron in the Winter (Take Along Books)

He was the illustrator for:

- A Fish Out of Water adapted by Helen Palmer Geisel (ISBN 0-394-80023-0) (Beginner Book #23)
- Robert the Rose Horse by Joan Heilbroner (ISBN 0-394-80025-7) (Beginner Book #25)
- I'll Teach My Dog 100 Words by Michael K. Frith (ISBN 0-394-82692-2) (Bright and Early Book #17, later reissued as Beginner Book in the United Kingdom)
- Go, Dog. Go!: P.D. Eastman's Book of Things That Go (ISBN 0-679-88629-X) (Bright and Early Board Books, later reissued as Big Bright and Early Board Book)
- I'll Teach My Dog a Lot of Words by Michael K. Frith (ISBN 0-375-80099-9) (Bright and Early Board Book)

He wrote but Eastman did not illustrate:

- Snow illustrated by Roy McKie (ISBN 0-394-80027-3) (Beginner Book #27)

His work is included in:

- The Big Red Book of Beginner Books (ISBN 978-0-375-86531-2) (I Want to Be Somebody New!: A Sequel to Put Me in the Zoo, Sam and the Firefly, Stop That Ball!, Robert the Rose Horse, The Very Bad Bunny, and The Digging-est Dog (1995, reprinted in 2010)
- The Big Blue Book of Beginner Books (ISBN 978-0-375-85552-8) (Put Me in the Zoo, A Fly Went By, Are You My Mother?, Go, Dog. Go!, The Best Nest and It's Not Easy Being a Bunny) (1994, reprinted in 2008)
- The Big Purple Book of Beginner Books (ISBN 978-0-307-97587-4) (A Fish Out of Water, Snow, I'll Teach My Dog 100 Words, Flap Your Wings, Big Dog...Little Dog and Fred and Ted Go Camping (2012) (his last work after his death in early 1986)

== Direct-to-video ==
The P.D. Eastman collection was a series released by Random House. They are a video version of a "book on tape". None of these productions are animated.

=== P.D. Eastman Beginner Book Video ===
- Are You My Mother? plus Go, Dog. Go! and The Best Nest

== Other affiliations ==
Eastman was a member of the American Civil Liberties Union, Westport Artists, the Screen Cartoonists Guild, and the Audubon Society.

== Family ==
In 1941, P.D. Eastman married Mary Louise Whitham of Glendale, California. He had two sons, Allan and Peter Anthony. Peter Anthony Eastman, sometimes known as Tony, was an animator and children's book writer who directed film adaptations of children's books by Richard Scarry, and wrote and illustrated books including Fred & Ted Go Camping (2005), Fred & Ted Like to Fly (2007), and Fred & Ted's Road Trip (2011). Tony Eastman contributed new illustrations to reissues of his father's books including The Alphabet Book (2000), Big Dog... Little Dog (2003), Red Stop! Green Go! (2004), and The Cat in the Hat Beginner Book Dictionary (2007).
