= List of Dr. Seuss television specials =

This is a list of Dr. Seuss television specials.

Title	Original Air Date	Director	Studio	Network
How the Grinch Stole Christmas!	December 18, 1966	Chuck Jones	MGM Animation/Visual Arts	CBS
Horton Hears a Who!	March 19, 1970	Chuck Jones	MGM Animation/Visual Arts	CBS
The Cat in the Hat	March 10, 1971	Hawley Pratt	DePatie–Freleng Enterprises	CBS
The Lorax	February 14, 1972	Hawley Pratt	DePatie–Freleng Enterprises	CBS
Dr. Seuss on the Loose	October 15, 1973	Hawley Pratt	DePatie–Freleng Enterprises	CBS
The Hoober-Bloob Highway	February 19, 1975	Alan Zaslove	DePatie–Freleng Enterprises	CBS
Halloween Is Grinch Night	October 28, 1977	Gerard Baldwin	DePatie–Freleng Enterprises	ABC
Pontoffel Pock, Where Are You?	May 2, 1980	Gerard Baldwin	DePatie–Freleng Enterprises	ABC
The Grinch Grinches the Cat in the Hat	May 20, 1982	Bill Perez	Marvel Productions	ABC
The Butter Battle Book	November 13, 1989	Ralph Bakshi	Bakshi Animation	TNT
Daisy-Head Mayzie	February 5, 1995	Tony Collingwood	Hanna-Barbera; Tony Collingwood Productions	TNT
The Sneetches	November 3, 2025	Bronagh O'Haran	Netflix	Netflix
Untitled Cat in the Hat holiday special	TBA	TBA	Warner Bros. Pictures Animation	TBA
