= The Cat in the Hat (TV special) =

- Genre: Musical; Comedy; Fantasy
- Based on: The Cat in the Hat by: Dr. Seuss
- Written by: Dr. Seuss
- Directed by: Hawley Pratt
- Voices of: Daws Butler; Pamelyn Ferdin; Tony Frazier; Lewis Morford; Thurl Ravenscroft; Allan Sherman
- Composer: Dean Elliott
- Country of origin: United States

Production
- Executive producers: David H. DePatie; Friz Freleng
- Producers: Chuck Jones; Ted Geisel
- Running time: 25 mins.
- Production companies: The Cat in the Hat Productions; DePatie–Freleng Enterprises; CBS Productions

Original release
- Network: CBS
- Release: March 10, 1971

The Cat in the Hat is an American animated musical television special originally broadcast March 10, 1971 on CBS. It was based on the 1957 Dr. Seuss children's story of the same name, and produced by DePatie–Freleng Enterprises. With voices by Allan Sherman and prolific vocal performer Daws Butler, this half-hour special is a loose adaptation of the book with added musical sequences.

== Plot ==
As the story opens, it is too rainy and too cold to play outside, so a boy and his sister Sally sit bored and look out the window at No. 2322 Magnolia Boulevard. Their mother announces that she is ready to depart, then tells them to have fun and says she will return at 3:30 sharp. While their mother is out, they have no other choice but to think of something to do ("Nothing To Be Done").

Suddenly, the mysterious Cat in the Hat suddenly enters with a bump and fools around a bit. The family goldfish named Karlos K. Krinklebine orders him to leave but instead the Cat plays a game which he calls "Up, Up, Up, With a Fish", placing the fishbowl on top of a stack of bubbles. The children notice that the Cat is making the house a little untidy and the brother recalls their mother's projected return at 3:30. Noting their objections, the Cat bows to the voice of the majority and dejectedly states that he is going to Siberia, Russia. Immediately after leaving, however, the Cat bursts back in claiming that somebody stole his "moss-covered three-handled family gredunza". The Cat accuses Krinklebine of being the thief and sings a ballad about the loss of his treasured keepsake ("Family Gredunza").

The Cat then leads the kids on a search for the missing gredunza using his method of ("Calculatus Eliminatus"), in which random numbers and letters are drawn anywhere the gredunza should be to mark that they have already checked there. This makes a mess of everything and Krinklebine once again orders the Cat to leave. Ostensibly to gain sympathy, the Cat sings a pessimistic song ("I'm a Punk") to convey his low self-esteem. After Krinklebine shows no sympathy, the Cat puts him to sleep by singing a lullaby ("Beautiful Kittenfish", in the melody of "Beautiful Dreamer").

Having made a miraculous recovery from his bout of depression, the Cat brings out Thing One and Thing Two to aid in the search for the gredunza, singing to the kids that they can find ("Anything Under the Sun") but instead of being productive, the Things play a variety of sports using Krinklebine's fishbowl, noting that with every house they visit, "there's always some fish who doesn't like fun— good, clean, wholesome innocent fun". Frustrated, Krinklebine accuses the Cat of not being a real cat and his hat of not being a real hat. However, the Cat indignantly asserts his legitimacy by singing his name in several languages ("Cat, Hat"). The tune becomes so catchy that everyone, even Krinklebine, joins in and contributes, telling the Cat that in Russian he is a "chapka in a shlyapa". As the song ends, a car horn is heard in the distance. Krinklebine spots the kids' mother on her way home. The Things get back into their box and disappear, then the Cat exits immediately after. With the house an extreme mess, the kids wonder how they will clean up the house in time.

The Cat quickly returns, using a motorized vehicle to tidy things up in a jiffy. After cleaning the house, he departs, hinting that he may return someday ("Sweep Up the Memories"). Just as he departs through the back door, the mother walks in through the front door; she asks the kids how their day was and then tells them that she just saw a cat in a hat "going down the street with a moss-covered three-handled family gredunza". The exact identity of the object has never been revealed but this statement indicates that the gredunza was never really lost and the Cat simply wanted an excuse to have more fun. The two children look out the window much as they did at the beginning of the special and watch as the Cat walks off to his next adventure.

== Cast ==
- Allan Sherman as The Cat in the Hat / Narrator
- Dawes Butler as Carlos K. Krinklebein the Fish
- Tony Frazier as the Boy
- Pamelyn Ferdin as Sally
- Gloria Camacho as the Mother
- Thurl Ravenscroft as Thing One
- Lewis Morford as Thing Two

== Production ==
The production began at Chuck Jones' MGM Animation/Visual Arts in the late 1960s after the studio had finished The Phantom Tollbooth and another Dr. Seuss special, Horton Hears a Who!. After MGM stopped animation production and closed down its animation department for good around 1970, along with Seuss being dissatisfied with Jones' style in the previous TV specials, production was moved to DePatie–Freleng Enterprises (marking the company's first Dr. Seuss television special), which was run by Jones' fellow ex-Warner Bros. Cartoons alumnus Friz Freleng and Warner Bros. Cartoons's last original production executive David H. DePatie, due to DePatie's agent asking him if he was interested in taking over the special's production.

Although Chuck Jones and his staff were retained by DePatie–Freleng in the production of the special, as a storyboard artist and the producer along with Ted Geisel, Jones left the studio and did not work on any other Seuss projects after The Cat in the Hat. Other staff members that had worked with Jones, such as Dean Elliott and Maurice Noble, eventually stopped working on Seuss projects also. DePatie and Freleng were credited together as executive producers, while Jones was credited as producer with Seuss (under his actual name). For the next three Dr. Seuss animation specials, Freleng and Seuss (again using his real name) were credited as producers, although separately.

DePatie–Freleng animated a new Cat in the Hat Productions logo for this special, which would be used in the next three specials. The pace and rhyming sequences of several of the songs (particularly "Calculatus Eliminatus") led many to believe that they were composed by Sherman, since they closely resemble his earlier song parodies; however, only Seuss is credited.

== Differences from the book ==
The plot of the special differs significantly from the original book. Among the many deviations, the sequence in the book where the Cat balances all sorts of objects while standing on a ball, only to overdo it and come crashing down, is left out. The closest equivalent is the fishbowl and bubbles sequences.

Also differing is the role of Thing 1 and Thing 2; in the original book, they were simply things the Cat brought along to demonstrate fun, but in this special, they are commissioned to help find the cat's "moss-covered three-handled family gradunza". The vocabulary used in the special is also on a higher level than the book's, though still in Seuss' trademark rhyme.

== Home media ==
The special was originally released as a VHS on the CBS/Fox Video label's Playhouse Video imprint in 1989. It was later released as part of the Dr. Seuss Sing-Along Classics release from 20th Century Fox Home Entertainment with CBS Video and Fox Kids Video in the mid-1990s. It was also re-released on VHS in 2000 and 2001 by Paramount Home Video and Universal Studios Home Video respectively. Universal would later re-release the special on October 7, 2003 on DVD, as well as its final issue in the VHS format. Warner Home Video would later take over home video rights to the special and re-released it on DVD as well as on Blu-ray for the first time on August 7, 2012.

== The Cat in other TV specials and series ==
Although the original book's sequel The Cat in the Hat Comes Back did not receive an animated adaptation, the character went on to appear in several more Dr. Seuss specials. In 1973, there came Dr. Seuss on the Loose, where Sherman reprised his role as The Cat in the Hat. Here, The Cat in the Hat appeared in bridging sequences where he introduced animated adaptations of three other Dr. Seuss stories: The Sneetches, The Zax and Green Eggs and Ham. In 1982's The Grinch Grinches the Cat in the Hat, the character, now voiced by Mason Adams (Sherman had died shortly after Dr. Seuss on the Loose finished production), meets the title character of How the Grinch Stole Christmas! and sets out to reform his new green adversary. In 1995, the Cat appeared again, this time with the voice of Henry Gibson, to narrate Daisy-Head Mayzie, a special based on a posthumously published Dr. Seuss book. In 1996, a Muppet version of the Cat starred in The Wubbulous World of Dr. Seuss, where he was voiced by Bruce Lanoil and Martin P. Robinson. The Cat in the Hat Knows a Lot About That!, an educational animated series based on the Random House Library series, premiered in September 2010; the Cat is voiced by Martin Short.
