= The Cat in the Hat (play) =

2009 play adapted by Katie Mitchell

- Original language: English
- Written by: Katie Mitchell
- Based on: The Cat in the Hat by Dr. Seuss

Premiere
- Date: December 2009
- Place: Cottesloe Theatre at National Theatre, London

The Cat in the Hat is a 2009 play based on the 1957 children's book of the same name by Dr. Seuss, adapted by Katie Mitchell.

== Production history ==
The play opened in the Dorfman Theatre (then the Cottesloe Theatre) at the National Theatre, London in December 2009. The production was directed by Mitchell and featured Angus Wright as The Cat. The production, produced by Pádraig Cusack transferred to the Young Vic in January 2010 and then to Théâtre des Abeilles in Paris in March 2010.

A new production directed by Lillie Collier opened at the Edinburgh Festival Fringe in 2014 before opening at the Pleasance Theatre Islington in January 2015 before touring the UK.

For Christmas 2018, the Curve, Leicester produced with Rose Theatre Kingston a new production directed by Suba Das which toured the UK in spring 2019.

For Christmas 2019, the Turbine Theatre at Battersea Power Station directed by Lillie Collier.
