= The Lorax (TV special) =

1972 animated TV special

- Genre: Comedy/Fantasy/Musical
- Based on: The Lorax by Dr. Seuss
- Developed by: CBS. BFA Educational Media.
- Written by: Dr. Seuss
- Directed by: Hawley Pratt
- Voices of: Bob Holt; Athena Lorde; Harlen Carraher; Thurl Ravenscroft; Matt Bennison
- Narrated by: Introduced by: Eddie Albert
- Composer: Dean Elliott
- Country of origin: United States
- Original language: English

Production
- Executive producer: David H. DePatie
- Producers: Friz Freleng; Ted Geisel
- Running time: 24 minutes
- Production companies: The Cat in the Hat Productions; DePatie–Freleng Enterprises; CBS Productions

Original release
- Network: CBS
- Release: February 14, 1972

The Lorax is a musical fantasy animated television special produced by DePatie–Freleng Enterprises which first aired on CBS in the United States on February 14, 1972, and in Canada on CBC Television on October 22, 1972. The special was written by Dr. Seuss (Theodor Geisel), based on his 1971 book of the same name.

== Plot ==
A young boy in a gloomy ghost town meets the Once-ler, who recounts the story of the Lorax, a creature who speaks for the trees: as a young man, the Once-ler had arrived in a forest filled with brightly colored Truffula trees and playful animals. Enchanted by the trees, he cuts one down and constructs a versatile "Thneed," which he then decides to mass-produce. The Lorax warns the Once-Ler that he is clearing the forest faster than the slow-growing Truffulas can be replenished.

Industrialization progresses, the environment deteriorates and the animals become ill from pollution, with the Lorax sending them to cleaner homes. The Once-Ler considers the Lorax's warnings but decides the business is too valuable to himself and his workers to stop. When the last Truffula falls, Thneeds Inc. is forced to shut down.

The Lorax departs, leaving behind a pile of rocks marked "Unless." The Once-ler reveals to the boy that "Unless" signifies the need for someone who cares to take action. He gives the boy the last Truffula seed, encouraging him to restore the forest. As he leaves, a hole opens in the otherwise overcast sky.

== Voice cast ==
- Eddie Albert – Narrator
- Bob Holt – The Lorax, the Once-ler
- Athena Lorde – Miss O'Schmunsler
- Harlen Carraher – Boy, Singing Bears
- Thurl Ravenscroft – Singer

== Home media ==
The Lorax was released on VHS in 1994 as part of a CBS Video four-tape package called "Dr. Seuss Sing-Along Classics".

In 2003, Universal Studios Family Productions got the rights to the original 1972 TV special, and Universal released The Lorax on DVD under its home video label, Universal Pictures Home Entertainment, with newly remastered picture and sound. This release also included another special Pontoffel Pock, Where Are You? as an extra.

To tie-in with the 40th anniversary of the special and the release of film The Lorax, Warner Home Video released the special on a deluxe edition DVD and Blu-ray on February 14 (Valentine's Day), 2012. This release once again included Pontoffel Pock, Where Are You? and now also included The Butter Battle Book as another extra (however, when The Lorax was released on digital retailer sites in 2021, the two extras were taken out of the release and moved over to being included with the digital retailer release of Green Eggs and Ham and Other Treats, where they were restored in high definition).

== Reception ==
The Lorax received the Critics Award from the International Animated Cartoon Festival (Zagreb, 1972) and the Silver Media from the International Film and Television Festival (New York, 1972).
