= Pontoffel Pock, Where Are You? =

- Genre: Fantasy; Comedy; Adventure; Musical
- Written by: Dr. Seuss
- Directed by: Gerard Baldwin
- Voices of: Ken Lundie; Joe Raposo; Wayne Morton; Hal Smith; Sue Allen; Don Messick
- Composer: Joe Raposo
- Country of origin: United States

Production
- Executive producers: David H. DePatie; Friz Freleng
- Producer: Ted Geisel
- Running time: 24 minutes
- Production company: DePatie–Freleng Enterprises

Original release
- Network: ABC
- Release: May 2, 1980

Pontoffel Pock, Where Are You? (renamed Pontoffel Pock & His Magic Piano for the sing-a-long videocassette release) is an animated musical fantasy television special written by Dr. Seuss, directed by Gerard Baldwin, produced by DePatie–Freleng Enterprises, and completed in 1979 but first aired on ABC on May 2, 1980. This was one of the final productions done at DePatie–Freleng as the studio would be sold to Marvel Comics and become Marvel Productions in 1981. The songs are by Sesame Street composer Joe Raposo.

The special was nominated for an Emmy Award for "Outstanding Animated Program" the first year that award was given.

The story has been noted for its satirical critique of capitalist structures.

== Plot ==
On his first day working at Gickler's Dill Pickle Factory, young Pontoffel Pock is walked through his duty by Gil Gickler where he must push the lever called the "pushum" and pull the rope called the "pullum". After Gickler walks away, Pontoffel accidentally breaks the pushum by pulling it. This caused an alarm to go off as the machinery malfunctions and a dill pickle flood occurs that the other workers had to put a stop to while Pontoffel is shown taking refuge on top of a machinery with Gickler while giving him an "I don't know" gesture. Once the crisis was averted, Gickler angrily fires Pontoffel. Upon returning to his dilapidated home, Pontoffel wishes that he could "get away from it all". He is visited by McGillicuddy, a representative of the "Amalgamated Do-Gooding Fairies" who grants his wish by giving him a magical flying piano that can take him anywhere in the world. To do so, Pontoffel plays a simple fanfare and then chooses a destination by pressing one of many differently-colored buttons.

Pontoffel first goes to a country called Groogen, but gets carried away and starts recklessly flying through the sky, scaring the Groogenites and causing havoc. The magistrate of Groogen rules in that they load up the "Goomy Gun", which fires multicolored paint, to drive Pontoffel away. After being hit by the gun, Pontoffel plummets downward, but is able to send himself home at the last second by using the piano's Homing Pigeon Switch. McGillicuddy confronts Pontoffel for mishandling the piano and causing a scene in the country he flew to, so he calls in two of his fairy associates Humbolt and Higbee (who, however are never referred to individually by name) to confiscate the piano, but Pontoffel begs him for a second chance. McGillicuddy arrogantly complies, but decides to pick a random destination for Pontoffel and sends him to Casbahmopolis.

In Casbahmopolis, Pontoffel sees a procession for Neepha Feepha, a famous "eyeball dancer", and the two fall in love. Pontoffel sneaks into the palace where he finds her dancing for the king and promises his piano can take them anywhere, and they are pursued and surrounded by the palace guards, one of whom breaks the Homing Pigeon Switch off the piano upon hearing Pontoffel's attempt of its use for escape. Choosing a random button as an alternative but unsuccessful option to escape, he loses control of the piano as it tilts over upon Neefa Feefa sitting on top of it, leading Neepha Feepja into slipping off of it and into the guards' clutches, without Pontoffel knowing at first. Not remembering which button can take him back to her, Pontoffel starts pushing random buttons, sending him to several different places such as the North Pole, the Congo region, Spain, Waikiki, Africa, Japan, and others, including Seuss's birthplace of Springfield, Massachusetts, in the hope of returning to her. Along the way, Pontoffel ends up in a stormy sky twice which sets the piano on fire with lightning, and later, Pontoffel ends up lost in Japan where there is heavy rain.

Meanwhile, McGillicuddy regrets being selfish to Pontoffel by sending him to Casbahmopolis and gets worried that his superiors will discover what is happening with the piano. He enlists the help of all of his fairy associates (including Humbolt, Higbee and Heuckendorf) to fly all over the world, looking for Pontoffel. Eventually the Good Fairy-in-Chief sends out all the reserves to locate the piano, but none of them can find it in time. Pontoffel decides to set things right for the incident that got him fired in the first place, finally remembers the right button, and goes straight to Neepha Feepha, only to crash-land into the tower where she is being kept prisoner and destroy the piano. Neepha Feepha voices a wish to "get away from it all", just as Pontoffel had earlier, which comes to the attention of the fairies who appear to grant her wish. They are escorted home together, with the fairies having to carry the now-damaged piano with ropes. Gickler rehires Pontoffel, who finally gets the "pushum" and "pullum" gears working right (thanks to the moment he remembered the button on the piano that takes him to Casbahmopolis), and also newly hires Neepha Feepha after hearing about their exploits.

== Voice Cast ==
- Ken Lundie - Pontoffel Pock
- Joe Raposo - Gil Gickler, additional
- Wayne Morton - McGillicuddy, Groogen Cop, Palace Guard, additional
- Hal Smith - Fairy Assistant #2, Good Fairy-in-Chief, Flooglehorn Player, Groogen Dairywoman, Judge Hobart Heinrich Hinklefoos, King of Casbahmopolis, additional
- Sue Allen - Neepha Feepha (singing voice)
- Don Messick - Fairy Assistant #1, Little Boy, Heuckendorf, additional
- Barbara Donatelli - Neepha Feepha (speaking voice; uncredited)

== Musical numbers ==
- "Pull on the Pull 'Em" - Gil Gickler and Factory Workers
- "I Had Failed" - Pontoffel Pock and Factory Workers
- "The House that My Family Had Left Me" - Pontoffel Pock (to the tune of "My Bonnie Lies Over the Ocean")
- "This Wondrous Piano" - McGillicuddy, Humbolt and Higbee
- "Welcome to Groogen" - Groogen Townspeople
- "I'm Flying Free" - Pontoffel Pock
- "Load Up The Goomy Gun" - Groogen Townspeople
- "(Neepha Feepha) In Your Eyes" - Neepha Feepha and Pontoffel Pock
- "Optic Koptic (AKA The Eyes Song)" - Neepha Feepha and Pontoffel Pock (ending with a brief reprise to "This Wondrous Piano")
- "Pontoffel Pock, Where the Heck Are You?" - McGillicuddy, Fairies and Neepha Feepha
- "Pull On the Pull 'Em (Reprise)" - Gil Gickler, Neepha Feepha, Pontoffel Pock and Factory Workers

== Home media ==
This special was released on VHS in 1989 by CBS/Fox Video under the Playhouse Video label and in 1992 by Random House Home Video. A sing-along VHS was released by CBS Video in 1996 under the title Pontoffel Pock and the Magical Piano. It was released with The Lorax on both VHS and DVD by Universal Studios Home Entertainment in 2003 and again on its Deluxe Edition Blu-ray reprint in 2012 by Warner Home Video (which also included The Butter Battle Book). In March 2021, Pontoffel Pock, Where Are You? was re-released as an extra on digital retailer versions of Dr. Seuss on the Loose (which was titled Dr. Seuss's Green Eggs and Ham and Other Treats on this release), again along with The Butter Battle Book. Both extras were remastered in high definition exclusively for this release.

== See also ==
- Oh, the Places You'll Go!
