= Green Eggs and Ham =

1960 children's book by Dr. Seuss

- Author: Dr. Seuss
- Illustrator: Dr. Seuss
- Cover artist: Dr. Seuss
- Language: English
- Series: Beginner Books
- Genre: Children's literature
- Publisher: Random House
- Publication date: August 12, 1960 (renewed in 1988)
- Publication place: United States
- ISBN: 978-0-394-80016-5
- OCLC: 184476
- Preceded by: One Fish, Two Fish, Red Fish, Blue Fish
- Followed by: The Sneetches and Other Stories

Green Eggs and Ham is a children's book by Dr. Seuss. It was published by the Beginner Books imprint of Random House on August 12, 1960. The book follows "Sam-I-am" as he follows an unnamed character (eventually named "Guy-Am-I" in later material) repeatedly requesting that he try a dish of green eggs and ham before the unnamed character eventually tries and approves of it.

Seuss began writing Green Eggs and Ham after Bennett Cerf, his editor, bet him $50 (equivalent to $544 in 2025) that he could not write an engaging children's book using a vocabulary of 50 words. Finding the challenge difficult, Seuss used notes, charts, and checklists to keep track of his progress. The book covers themes of conflict between individuals, though Seuss would state that it lacks any deeper meaning.

Green Eggs and Ham was widely praised by critics for its writing and illustration, and the challenge of writing a book in 50 words is regarded as a success. The book has been the subject of multiple adaptations, including a television series of the same name in 2019.

== Plot ==
Sam-I-am offers an unnamed character (Guy-Am-I) a plate of green eggs and ham, but he tells Sam that he hates the food. Sam continues to ask him to eat the food in various locations and with various animals for dining partners, but his answer remains the same. Finally, when persuaded to try the dish, he realizes that he likes green eggs and ham, and thanks Sam-I-am.

== Writing and release ==
Green Eggs and Ham was written and illustrated by Theodor Seuss Geisel under his pen name Dr. Seuss. He wrote the book after his editor at Random House, Bennett Cerf, bet him $50 (equivalent to $544 in 2025) that he could not write an engaging children's book using a vocabulary of only 50 distinct words. The bet was a response to Seuss's previous success, The Cat in the Hat, which was written using 236 distinct words. Seuss took extensive notes to work out how to best use 50 words, creating different charts and checklists. By the time he finished arranging the words, he had memorized many of the statistics of how he used them.

Green Eggs and Ham only uses 50 words: a, am, and, anywhere, are, be, boat, box, car, could, dark, do, eat, eggs, fox, goat, good, green, ham, here, house, I, if, in, let, like, may, me, mouse, not, on, or, rain, Sam, say, see, so, thank, that, the, them, there, they, train, tree, try, will, with, would, and you. Of these words, not appears the most frequently, used a total of 82 times. Anywhere is the only word in the book to have more than a single syllable.

Seuss found the restriction especially challenging, and he rewrote many pages before he was satisfied with the rhymes. The drafts were typed on washi paper, which Seuss attached to his illustrations. His wife Helen Palmer sometimes placed his discarded drafts back on his desk in the hope that he would approve of them after looking at them a second time, though he rarely did.

Early drafts had the unnamed character speak more aggressively to Sam-I-am. When the two characters were in a car atop the tree, he was originally written as saying, "Sam-I-am. You let me be. Not in a car. You let me be!" Seuss changed this to "I would not, could not in a tree. Not in a car! You let me be", making the outburst less direct and moving the exclamation point away from the command. In another example, he is written as saying "I do not like you, Sam-I-am". The drafts also described the subject as green ham and eggs instead of the final wording, green eggs and ham.

Dr. Seuss finished writing Green Eggs and Ham in the early spring of 1960. A reading was scheduled for April 19 in the office of Louise Bonino at Random House. These readings were often attended by the entire staff, but Cerf was out of the office that day, so a dinner party was arranged for the reading. The reading ended with applause, but Seuss remained self-critical and scrutinized pages that he felt did not get the reaction he had hoped. Phyllis Cerf had intended to announce Green Eggs and Ham with two other children's books, Are You My Mother? and Put Me in the Zoo, and a publicist was sent to request that reviewers postpone reviews after advance sheets had been distributed early.

Green Eggs and Ham was published on August 12, 1960. At the time, approximately three million Dr. Seuss books had already been sold.

== Analysis and themes ==
Dr. Seuss believed that children's books had more power to do good or evil for society than any other medium, and Green Eggs and Ham was the first of Seuss's Beginner Books to carry a lesson for children. Despite this, Dr. Seuss has said that there is no deeper meaning in the book, insisting that "the only meaning was that Bennett Cerf, my publisher, bet me fifty bucks I couldn't write a book using only fifty words".

Green Eggs and Ham reverses the traditional structure of an adult trying to convince a child to try new foods. It is one of many Dr. Seuss books about a defiance of norms—in this case, the persistence of Sam-I-am after his offer of green eggs and ham is rejected. It explores the underlying social connection between individuals set in opposition to one another, but it does so in a way that appeals to the interests of children. Both characters refuse to move from their decision throughout the book until the adult finally gives in at the end.

The narrative of Green Eggs and Ham is told in a question-and-answer structure. Consistent use of the name Sam-I-am instead of simply Sam allowed Seuss to maintain meter when rhyming it with the eponymous green eggs and ham. The title of Green Eggs and Ham is a play on the common phrase ham and eggs, inverting it to draw the reader's attention.

Literature professor Donald E. Pease described Sam-I-am as "a young Grinch-like creature". One academic, Tim Wolf, argued that Sam-I-am has no distinguishing gender or sex and could be read as male or female.

== Reception ==
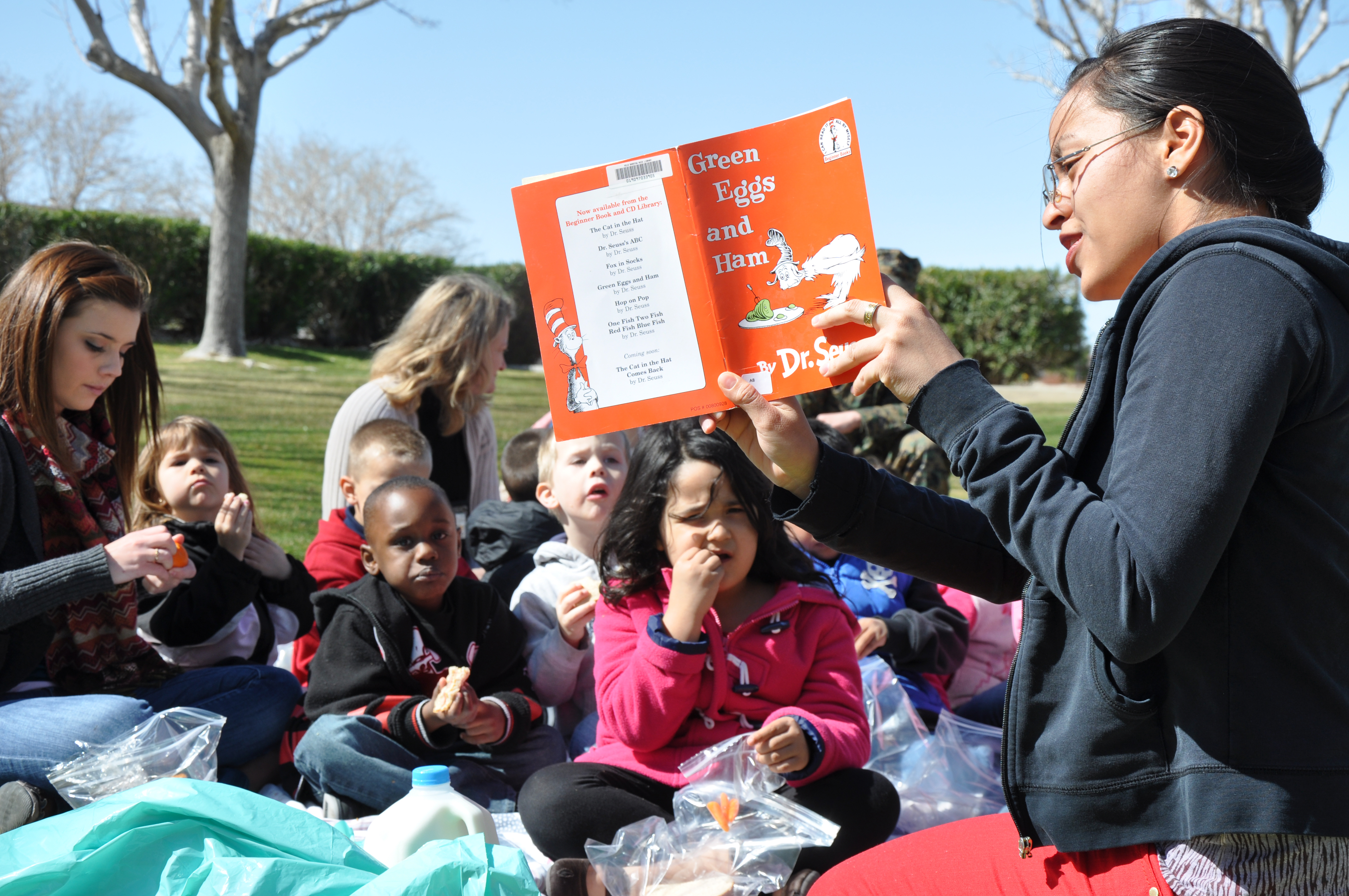
A woman reading and showing Green Eggs and Ham to children

Green Eggs and Ham was widely praised upon its release, and reviewers overwhelmingly celebrated that the book was written using only 50 distinct words. Emily Maxwell of The New Yorker commented on Seuss's use of the vocabulary, saying that "reading him, one is hardly aware that there are more than fifty words". It was praised for its rhythm and illustrations as well as its use of rhymes. The humorous nature of the book was also received positively.

The Saturday Review of Literature praised the book's pacing, paying attention specifically to the opening pages in which Sam-I-am introduces himself with a placard. Professor of children's literature Philip Nel similarly lauded the introduction for introducing the conflict of the book visually through Sam-I-am's active movement and the unnamed character's avoidance.

In 1999, the National Education Association conducted an online survey of children and teachers, seeking the 100 most popular children's books. The children ranked Green Eggs and Ham third, just above another Dr. Seuss book, The Cat in the Hat. The teachers ranked it fourth. Teachers ranked it fourth again in a 2007 National Education Association poll. Scholastic Parent & Child magazine placed it #7 among the "100 Greatest Books for Kids" in 2012. That same year, it was ranked number 12 among the "Top 100 Picture Books" in a survey published by School Library Journal – the first of five Dr. Seuss books on the list.

== Legacy ==
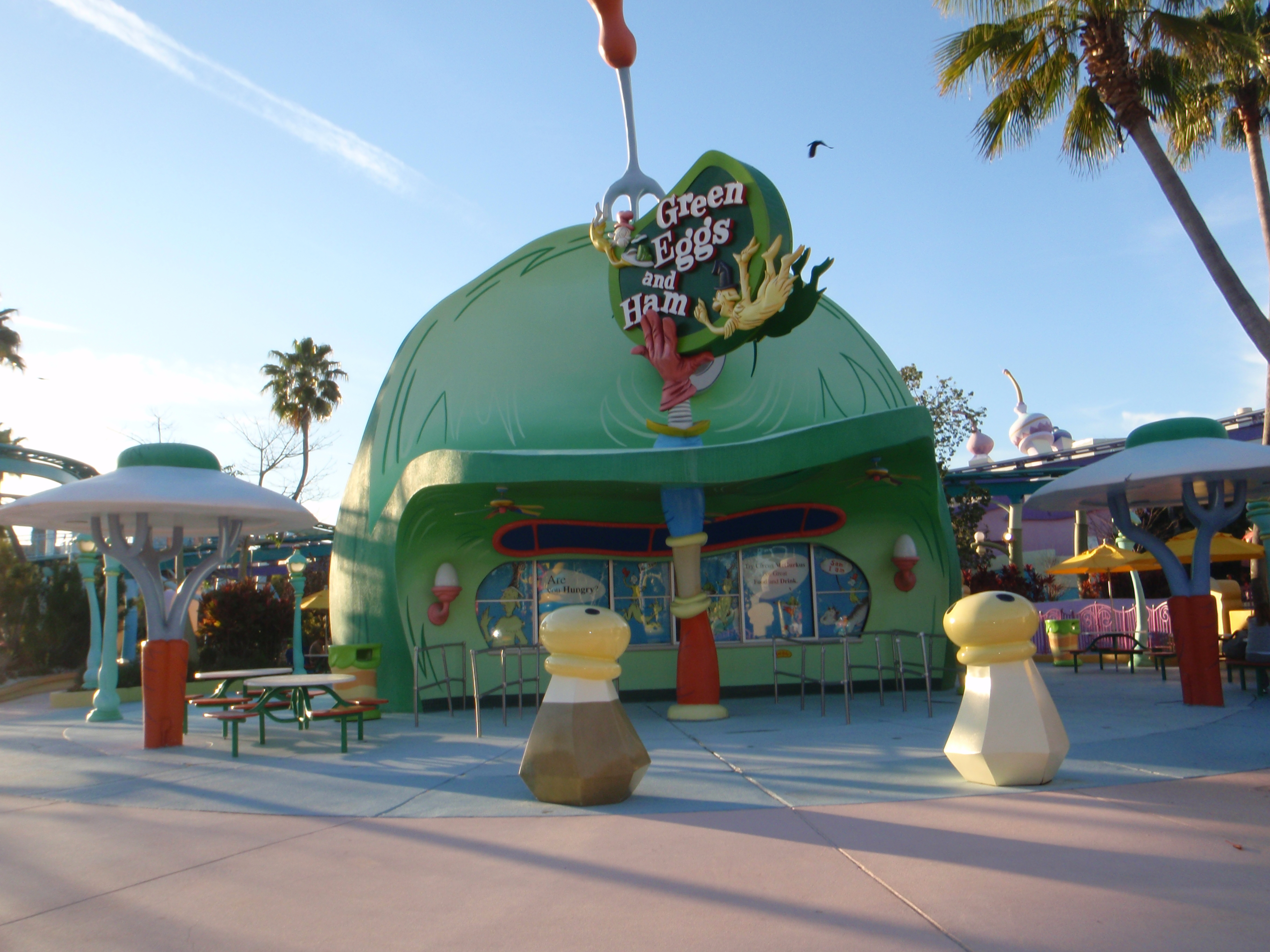
The Green Eggs and Ham Cafe in the Seuss Landing theme park

In 1967, Green Eggs and Ham ranked as the best-selling children's book. At the end of 2000, it had sold 8,143,088 copies, making it the most popular book by Dr. Seuss and the all-time fourth best-selling hardcover children's book in the United States.

At Dr. Seuss's alma mater, Dartmouth College, it became an inside joke that the book's title was a reference to the breakfast food served in the on-campus cafeteria. When Dr. Seuss received an honorary doctorate from Princeton University in 1985, the graduating class rose and recited Green Eggs and Ham in its entirety for him. Dr. Seuss reportedly spent the rest of his life enduring gifts of green eggs and ham, which he described as "deplorable stuff". Later in life, he said that Green Eggs and Ham was the only book of his that still made him laugh.

The Green Eggs and Ham Cafe opened in the Seuss Landing island at the Universal Islands of Adventure theme park in 1999. It closed in 2015 before reopening in 2019. The cafe serves the titular green eggs and ham as well as other foods featured in Dr. Seuss books.

U.S. District Court Judge James Muirhead referenced Green Eggs and Ham in his September 21, 2007, court ruling after receiving an egg in the mail from prisoner Charles Jay Wolff, who was protesting against the prison diet. Muirhead ordered the egg destroyed and rendered his judgment in the style of Seuss. Senator Ted Cruz read the book on the floor of the United States Senate during his filibuster over the funding of the Affordable Care Act. Musician will.i.am has stated that his moniker is inspired by the story.

Many parodies of Green Eggs and Ham have been created, including a rap song by Moxy Früvous and a sketch on Saturday Night Live featuring the minister Jesse Jackson reading the book during a sermon. Another Saturday Night Live sketch which parodied the book, as broadcast on October 10, 2026, attracted attention on the basis of host Shane Gillis having used an obscenity live on the air. This was censored via audio drop-out on the West Coast and internationally. Gillis apologized after uttering the word.

Green Eggs and Ham has been adapted into stage and television versions. In 1973, it was adapted as an animated television special alongside The Sneetches and The Zax. Originally titled Dr. Seuss on the Loose, the special was later renamed Green Eggs and Ham and Other Stories. Voice actor and ventriloquist Paul Winchell portrayed both Sam-I-Am and the unnamed character. The book was adapted as a video game for the Game Boy Advance, Dr. Seuss' Green Eggs and Ham, published by NewKidCo and released on November 17, 2003. A television adaptation was released by Netflix in 2019, also titled Green Eggs and Ham. It stars Adam DeVine as Sam-I-Am, a wanted criminal posing as a wildlife protector, and Michael Douglas as the unnamed character, a failed inventor who is given the name Guy-Am-I for the series. The show introduces new characters, settings, and plots independently from the book. The mouse (named Squeaky and voiced by Daveed Diggs), fox (named Michael and voiced by Tracy Morgan), and goat (voiced by John Turturro) all appear as recurring or guest characters. A graphic novel Green Eggs and Ham Take a Hike, released on January 7, 2025, is written and illustrated by James Kochalka. In the graphic novel, the unnamed character's name is Walter.
