= The Sneetches and Other Stories =

1961 children's book by Dr. Seuss

- Front cover with Seuss illustration
- Author: Dr. Seuss
- Illustrator: Dr. Seuss
- Genre: Children's picture book, short stories in rhyme
- Publisher: Random House
- Publication date: August 12, 1961 (renewed in 1989)
- Media type: Print (hardcover)
- Pages: 65
- OCLC: 470409
- LC Class: PZ8.3.S477 Sn 1961
- Preceded by: Green Eggs and Ham
- Followed by: Dr. Seuss's Sleep Book

The Sneetches and Other Stories is a collection of stories by American children's author Dr. Seuss, published in 1961. It is composed of four separate stories with themes of tolerance, diversity, and compromise: "The Sneetches", "The Zax", "Too Many Daves", and "What Was I Scared Of?" Based on an online poll, the National Education Association listed the book as one of its "Teachers' Top 100 Books for Children". In 2012 it was ranked number 63 among the Top 100 Picture Books in a survey published by School Library Journal – the fifth of five Dr. Seuss books on the list.

"The Sneetches" and "The Zax" were later adapted, along with Green Eggs and Ham, into 1973's animated TV musical special Dr. Seuss on the Loose: The Sneetches, The Zax, Green Eggs and Ham with Hans Conried voicing the narrator and both Zax, Paul Winchell voicing the Sneetches, and Bob Holt voicing Sylvester McMonkey McBean.

In 2022, it was announced that a 45-minute CGI animated film based on The Sneetches was in development for Netflix. The film was released on November 3, 2025, in co-production with Brown Bag Films.

== Stories ==
=== The Sneetches ===
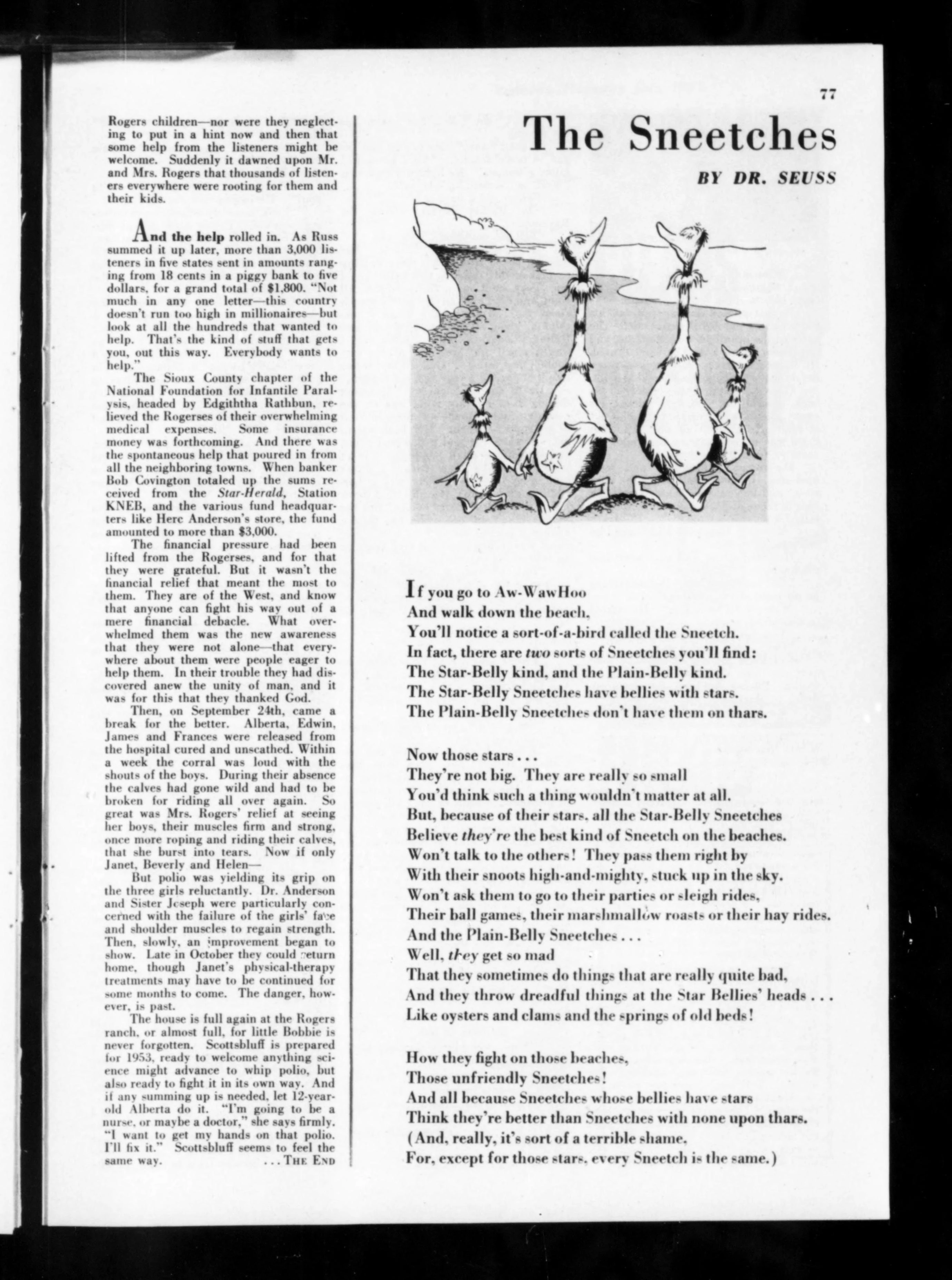
The 1953 Redbook version of "The Sneetches"

The first story in the collection tells of a group of yellow bird-like creatures, the Sneetches, some of whom have a green star on their bellies. At the beginning of the story, Sneetches with stars discriminate against and shun those without. Then one day, an entrepreneur named Sylvester McMonkey McBean (calling himself "the Fix-It-Up Chappie") appears and offers the Sneetches without stars the chance to get them with his Star-On machine, for three dollars. The treatment is instantly popular, but this upsets the original star-bellied Sneetches, as they are in danger of losing their special status. McBean then tells them about his Star-Off machine, costing ten dollars, and the Sneetches who originally had stars happily pay the money to have them removed in order to remain special. However, McBean does not share the prejudices of the Sneetches and allows the recently-starred Sneetches through this machine as well. Ultimately, this escalates, with the Sneetches running from one machine to the next,

"Until neither the Plain nor the Star-Bellies knew
Whether this one was that one... or that one was this one
Or which one was what one... or what one was who."

This continues until the Sneetches are penniless and McBean departs as a rich man, amused by their folly. Despite his assertion that "you can't teach a Sneetch", the Sneetches learn from this experience that neither plain-bellied nor star-bellied Sneetches are superior, and they are able to get along and become friends.

External videos
- Panel discussion on "Civil and Human Rights Themes in Dr. Seuss' The Sneetches and Yertle the Turtle", New York Law School, March 1, 2013, C-SPAN

"The Sneetches" was intended by Seuss as a satire of discrimination between races and cultures, and was specifically inspired by his opposition to antisemitism.

The Sneetches were introduced in a short poem, also called "The Sneetches", that was published in Redbook magazine in 1953. In the poem, the Sneetches reside on the island of Aw-WawHoo (O'ahu), and the plain-bellied Sneetches, instead of despair, have grown violent and will throw objects at the star-bellied Sneetches' heads. McBean does not appear in the poem.

=== The Zax ===
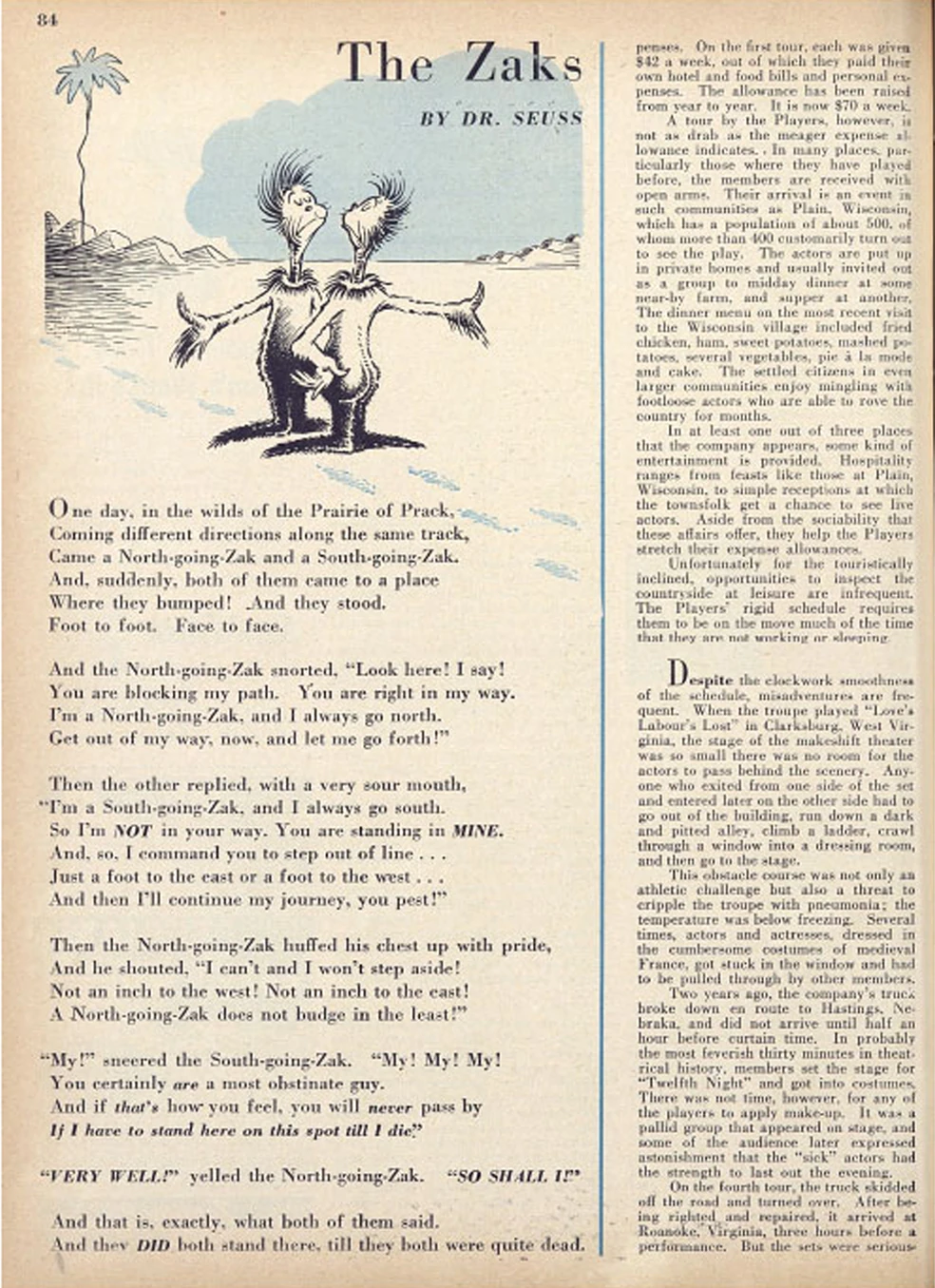
The 1954 Redbook version, "The Zaks"

In "The Zax", a North-going Zax and a South-going Zax meet face to face on the Prairie of Prax. Each asks the other to make way, but neither budges, saying it is against their upbringing to move any other way. Because they stubbornly refuse to move (east, west, or any direction except their respective headings) to get past each other, the two Zax then face off against each other with their arms crossed. The Zax stand so long that eventually a highway overpass is built around them. The story ends with the Zax still standing there "unbudged in their tracks".

An early version of the story, "The Zaks", was printed in Redbook magazine in 1954. In this version, both Zaks stay in place until they are "both (...) quite dead."

=== Too Many Daves ===
"Too Many Daves" is a very short story about a mother, Mrs. McCave, who named all twenty-three of her sons Dave. This causes minor problems in the family when she calls one of them, but instead, they all come, and the rest of the story lists unusual and amusing names she wishes she had given them, such as "Bodkin Van Horn", "Hoos-Foos", "Snimm", "Hot-Shot", "Sunny Jim", "Shadrack", "Blinkey", "Stuffy", "Stinkey", "Putt-Putt", "Moon Face", "Marvin O'Gravel Balloon Face", "Ziggy", "Soggy Muff", "Buffalo Bill", "Biffalo Buff", "Sneepy", "Weepy Weed", "Paris Garters", "Harris Tweed", "Sir Michael Carmichael Zutt", "Oliver Boliver Butt" and "Zanzibar Buck-Buck McFate". The story ends with the statement that "she didn't do it, and now it's too late."

=== What Was I Scared Of? ===
"What Was I Scared Of?" tells the tale of a character who frequently encounters an empty pair of pale-green pants in dark and spooky locations. The character, who is the narrator, is initially afraid of the pants, which are able to stand freely despite the lack of a wearer. However, when he screams for help, the pants also start to cry, and he realizes that "they were just as scared as I!" The empty pants and the narrator become friends. This is one of the few Seuss works in verse that is not written in anapestic tetrameter.

== Distribution by NATO in Bosnia ==
In 1998, NATO translated the collection into Serbo-Croatian and planned to distribute 500,000 copies to children in Bosnia and Herzegovina, as part of a campaign to encourage tolerance. This was later scaled back to 50,000 copies at a cost of $120,000 as well as looking for a more appropriate source of funding such as an NGO, private charity or corporation, as this expenditure did not meet the "Minimum Military Requirement" test for NATO common funding eligibility.
