= Dr. Seuss on the Loose =

- Title card
- Genre: Musical; Comedy
- Based on: The Sneetches and Other Stories and Green Eggs and Ham by Dr. Seuss
- Written by: Dr. Seuss
- Directed by: Hawley Pratt
- Presented by: Allan Sherman
- Voices of: Hans Conried; Paul Winchell; Bob Holt
- Narrated by: Hans Conried
- Composer: Dean Elliott
- Country of origin: United States
- Original language: English

Production
- Executive producer: David H. DePatie
- Producers: Friz Freleng; Ted Geisel
- Editors: Allan Potter; Joe Siracusa; Rick Steward
- Running time: 25 minutes
- Production companies: The Cat in the Hat Productions; DePatie–Freleng Enterprises; CBS Productions

Original release
- Network: CBS
- Release: October 15, 1973

Dr. Seuss on the Loose is an American animated musical television special, first airing on CBS on October 15, 1973. The special was commissioned and sponsored by Nestlé, and is hosted by The Cat in the Hat, who introduces animated adaptations of the Dr. Seuss stories The Sneetches, The Zax, and Green Eggs and Ham. Allan Sherman reprised his role as the voice of The Cat in the Hat from the 1971 television special, which marked his final role prior to his death on November 20, 1973. The special became a popular annual repeat for most of the decade until its last CBS showing on July 12, 1979.

The special aired in various countries in 1975, including ITV in England on January 1, and ABC-TV in Australia on September 21.

The anthology was released as Green Eggs and Ham and Other Stories for a sing-along videocassette distributed by Fox Video and released in 1994 (later re-printed in 1997) and a Blu-ray deluxe edition released in 2012.

== Plot ==
=== The Sneetches ===
The first (and longest) story in the collection tells of a group of yellow bird-like creatures called the Sneetches, some of whom have a green star on their bellies. At the beginning of the story, Sneetches with stars discriminate against and shun those without, as shown by a star-bellied youngster being instructed by his parents, then going outside and ignoring a non-star-bellied Sneetch saying a simple good morning. The star-bellied Sneetches sing a song about their greatness by having a party on the beach, where those without stars are excluded.

An entrepreneur named Sylvester McMonkey McBean (calling himself the Fix-It-Up Chappie) appears and offers the Sneetches without stars the chance to get them with his Star-On machine, for three dollars. The treatment is instantly popular, but this angers the Star-bellied Sneetches, who have not only lost their special status, they cannot discriminate which Sneetch is which. McBean does not share the prejudice of the Sneetches, only caring that he has paying customers, and offers another machine called Star-Off, which removes stars for ten dollars. Soon Sneetches are running from one machine to the next until they are unable to discern which Sneetches had stars and which ones were plain. This continues until the Sneetches are penniless and McBean dismantles his machines, tipping his hat to the Sneetches and driving away a rich man. He looks directly at the camera, directly telling the viewer "you can't teach a Sneetch". However, the narrator says McBean was wrong, as the Sneetches learn from this experience that neither plain-belly nor star-belly Sneetches are superior, and they are able to get along and become friends. The sketch ends with a reprise of the beach party song, with the lyrics now reflecting how they are accepting of each other.

=== The Zax ===
In "The Zax", a North-going Zax and a South-going Zax bump face to face on the Prairie of Prax. Each one asks the other to make way, but neither budges, saying it is against their upbringing to move any other way. Because they stubbornly refuse to move (east, west, or any direction except their respective headings) to get past each other, the two Zax then face off against each other with their arms crossed, thinking if they stand still, the world will too. The Zax stand so long through nights, weather, and seasons, that eventually, they didn't realize that the world didn't stand still, the world grew, because after a couple years, a freeway is built around them with a highway overpass over them. The story ends with the Zax still standing there "unbudged" in their tracks.

=== Green Eggs and Ham ===
In "Green Eggs and Ham", Sam-I-Am offers a man to eat a plate of green eggs and ham. However, the man tells Sam he hates the food. Sam-I-Am further asks the man to eat the food in various locations (in a house, in a box, in a car, in a tree, on a train, in the dark, in the rain, and on a boat) and with some animals as dining partners (a mouse, a fox, and a goat), but he is still rebuffed. A running gag exclusive to this short is the fox in the box being hunted by several dogs and fox hunters on horseback (the hunters and their steeds always appear with their faces cut off by the top screen) Finally, the man tries the dish hoping Sam would leave him alone. When the man takes his first bite, he likes green eggs and ham and thanks Sam-I-Am getting him to try them.

== Voice cast ==
- Allan Sherman – The Cat in the Hat
- Hans Conried – Narrator, North-going Zax, South-going Zax
- Paul Winchell – Sam-I-Am, Guy-Am-I, Sneetches
- Bob Holt – Sylvester McMonkey McBean, Sneetches

== Subsequent releases ==
The special was originally released as a VHS on the CBS/Fox Video label's Playhouse Video imprint in 1989. It was later released as part of the Dr. Seuss Sing-Along Classics release from 20th Century Fox Home Entertainment with CBS Video and Fox Kids Video in the mid-1990s. It was also re-released on VHS in 2000 and 2001 by Paramount Home Video and Universal Studios Home Video respectively. Universal would later re-release the special on October 7, 2003 on DVD, as well as its final issue in the VHS format, both paired with Halloween is Grinch Night. In June 2012, Warner Home Video remastered and re-released the special on a special deluxe edition Blu-ray and DVD. In March 2021, the special was released on digital retailer sites under the title Dr. Seuss's Green Eggs and Ham and Other Treats, this time paired with Pontoffel Pock, Where Are You? and The Butter Battle Book also included as extras (which were remastered in high definition exclusively for this release).
