= List of Illumination productions =

Current logo, used first in Despicable Me 3 (2017)

This is a list of productions produced by Illumination (formerly known as Illumination Entertainment), an American film and animation studio based in Santa Monica, California, United States. This includes feature films, shorts, television specials, and digital series. As of 2026, Illumination has released 17 feature films, which were all distributed by Universal Pictures, with their first being Despicable Me on July 9, 2010, and their latest being Minions & Monsters on July 1, 2026.

Their upcoming slate of films includes Not Alone on April 16, 2027.

== Feature films ==
All films are distributed by Universal Pictures unless noted otherwise.

=== Released ===
Title	Release date	Director(s)	Writer(s)		Producer(s)	Executive producer(s)	Composer(s)	Co-production with	Animation service(s)
Title	Release date	Director(s)	Story	Screenplay	Producer(s)	Executive producer(s)	Composer(s)	Co-production with	Animation service(s)
Despicable Me	July 9, 2010	Chris Renaud; Pierre Coffin	Sergio Pablos	Cinco Paul; Ken Daurio	Chris Meledandri; Janet Healy; John Cohen	Sergio Pablos; Nina Rowan	Pharrell Williams; Heitor Pereira (score) Pharrell Williams (songs and themes)	—N/a	Mac Guff
Hop	April 1, 2011	Tim Hill	Cinco Paul; Ken Daurio		Chris Meledandri; Michele Imperato Stabile	John Cohen	Christopher Lennertz	Relativity Media	Rhythm & Hues Studios
Hop	April 1, 2011	Tim Hill	—N/a	Brian Lynch	Chris Meledandri; Michele Imperato Stabile	John Cohen	Christopher Lennertz	Relativity Media	Rhythm & Hues Studios
The Lorax	March 2, 2012	Chris Renaud Co-director: Kyle Balda	Based on the book by Dr. Seuss		Chris Meledandri; Janet Healy	Audrey Geisel; Cinco Paul; Ken Daurio	John Powell (score) John Powell; Cinco Paul (songs)	—N/a	Illumination Mac Guff; Mac Guff
The Lorax	March 2, 2012	Chris Renaud Co-director: Kyle Balda	Cinco Paul; Ken Daurio		Chris Meledandri; Janet Healy	Audrey Geisel; Cinco Paul; Ken Daurio	John Powell (score) John Powell; Cinco Paul (songs)	—N/a	Illumination Mac Guff; Mac Guff
Despicable Me 2	July 3, 2013	Chris Renaud; Pierre Coffin	Cinco Paul; Ken Daurio		Chris Meledandri; Janet Healy	—N/a	Heitor Pereira (score) Pharrell Williams (songs and themes)	—N/a	Illumination Mac Guff
Minions	July 10, 2015	Pierre Coffin; Kyle Balda	Brian Lynch		Chris Meledandri; Janet Healy	Chris Renaud	Heitor Pereira	—N/a	Illumination Mac Guff
The Secret Life of Pets	July 8, 2016	Chris Renaud Co-director: Yarrow Cheney	Cinco Paul; Ken Daurio; Brian Lynch		Chris Meledandri; Janet Healy	—N/a	Alexandre Desplat	—N/a	Illumination Mac Guff
Sing	December 21, 2016	Garth Jennings Co-director: Christophe Lourdelet	Garth Jennings		Chris Meledandri; Janet Healy	—N/a	Joby Talbot	—N/a	Illumination Mac Guff
Despicable Me 3	June 30, 2017	Pierre Coffin; Kyle Balda Co-director: Eric Guillon	Cinco Paul; Ken Daurio		Chris Meledandri; Janet Healy	Chris Renaud	Heitor Pereira (score) Pharrell Williams (songs and themes)	—N/a	Illumination Mac Guff
The Grinch	November 9, 2018	Scott Mosier; Yarrow Cheney	Based on the book by Dr. Seuss		Chris Meledandri; Janet Healy	Latifa Ouaou; Audrey Geisel; Chris Renaud	Danny Elfman	—N/a	Illumination Mac Guff
The Grinch	November 9, 2018	Scott Mosier; Yarrow Cheney	Michael LeSieur; Tommy Swerdlow		Chris Meledandri; Janet Healy	Latifa Ouaou; Audrey Geisel; Chris Renaud	Danny Elfman	—N/a	Illumination Mac Guff
The Secret Life of Pets 2	June 7, 2019	Chris Renaud Co-director: Jonathan del Val	Brian Lynch		Chris Meledandri; Janet Healy	Brett Hoffman	Alexandre Desplat	—N/a	Illumination Mac Guff
Sing 2	December 22, 2021	Garth Jennings Co-director: Christophe Lourdelet	Garth Jennings		Chris Meledandri; Janet Healy	Dana Krupinski	Joby Talbot	—N/a	Illumination Studios Paris
Minions: The Rise of Gru	July 1, 2022	Kyle Balda Co-directors: Brad Ableson; Jonathan del Val	Matthew Fogel		Chris Meledandri; Janet Healy; Chris Renaud	Brett Hoffman	Heitor Pereira	—N/a	Illumination Studios Paris
Minions: The Rise of Gru	July 1, 2022	Kyle Balda Co-directors: Brad Ableson; Jonathan del Val	Brian Lynch	—N/a	Chris Meledandri; Janet Healy; Chris Renaud	Brett Hoffman	Heitor Pereira	—N/a	Illumination Studios Paris
The Super Mario Bros. Movie	April 5, 2023	Aaron Horvath; Michael Jelenic Co-directors: Pierre Leduc; Fabien Polack	Based on the video games by Nintendo		Chris Meledandri; Shigeru Miyamoto	Brett Hoffman; Bill Ryan; Yusuke Beppu	Brian Tyler	Nintendo	Illumination Studios Paris
The Super Mario Bros. Movie	April 5, 2023	Aaron Horvath; Michael Jelenic Co-directors: Pierre Leduc; Fabien Polack	Matthew Fogel		Chris Meledandri; Shigeru Miyamoto	Brett Hoffman; Bill Ryan; Yusuke Beppu	Brian Tyler	Nintendo	Illumination Studios Paris
Migration	December 22, 2023	Benjamin Renner Co-director: Guylo Homsy	Mike White		Chris Meledandri	Joy Poirel	John Powell	—N/a	Illumination Studios Paris
Migration	December 22, 2023	Benjamin Renner Co-director: Guylo Homsy	Benjamin Renner	—N/a	Chris Meledandri	Joy Poirel	John Powell	—N/a	Illumination Studios Paris
Despicable Me 4	July 3, 2024	Chris Renaud Co-director: Patrick Delage	Mike White; Ken Daurio		Chris Meledandri; Brett Hoffman	—N/a	Heitor Pereira (score) Pharrell Williams (songs and themes)	—N/a	Illumination Studios Paris
The Super Mario Galaxy Movie	April 1, 2026	Aaron Horvath; Michael Jelenic Co-directors: Pierre Leduc; Fabien Polack	Based on the video games by Nintendo		Chris Meledandri; Shigeru Miyamoto	Brett Hoffman; Bill Ryan; Yusuke Beppu	Brian Tyler	Nintendo	Illumination Studios Paris
The Super Mario Galaxy Movie	April 1, 2026	Aaron Horvath; Michael Jelenic Co-directors: Pierre Leduc; Fabien Polack	Matthew Fogel		Chris Meledandri; Shigeru Miyamoto	Brett Hoffman; Bill Ryan; Yusuke Beppu	Brian Tyler	Nintendo	Illumination Studios Paris
Minions & Monsters	July 1, 2026	Pierre Coffin Co-director: Patrick Delage	Brian Lynch; Pierre Coffin		Chris Meledandri; Bill Ryan	Brian Lynch; Chris Renaud	John Powell	—N/a	Illumination Studios Paris

=== Upcoming ===
Title	Release date	Director(s)	Writer(s)		Producer(s)	Co-production with	Animation service	Production status	Ref.
Title	Release date	Director(s)	Story	Screenplay	Producer(s)	Co-production with	Animation service	Production status	Ref.
Not Alone	April 16, 2027	Eric Guillon; Claire Dodgson; Jonathan Del Val	TBA		Chris Meledandri	—N/a	Illumination Studios Paris	In production	
The Secret Life of Pets 3	TBA				Chris Meledandri	—N/a	Illumination Studios Paris	In development	
Sing 3	TBA				Chris Meledandri	—N/a	Illumination Studios Paris	In development	
Untitled Barbie film	TBA		Based on the toys by Mattel		Chris Meledandri	Mattel Studios	Illumination Studios Paris	In development	

== Short films ==
Title	Release date	Distribution/Co-production with	Director(s)	Animation service(s)	Released with	Note
Home Makeover	December 14, 2010	Universal Studios Home Entertainment	Samuel Tourneux and Kyle Balda	Mac Guff	Despicable Me	Home video release
Orientation Day	December 14, 2010	Universal Studios Home Entertainment	Samuel Tourneux and Kyle Balda	Mac Guff	Despicable Me	Home video release
Banana	December 14, 2010	Universal Studios Home Entertainment	Samuel Tourneux and Kyle Balda	Mac Guff	Despicable Me	Home video release
Brad & Gary	July 1, 2011	Universal Pictures	Pierre Coffin	Mac Guff	—N/a	Theatrical release
Phil's Dance Party	March 23, 2012	Universal Studios Home Entertainment	Chris Bailey	Rhythm & Hues	Hop	Home video release
Wagon Ho!	August 7, 2012	Universal Studios Home Entertainment; Dr. Seuss Enterprises	Kyle Balda	Illumination Mac Guff	The Lorax	Home video release
Forces of Nature	August 7, 2012	Universal Studios Home Entertainment; Dr. Seuss Enterprises	Kyle Balda	Illumination Mac Guff	The Lorax	Home video release
Serenade	August 7, 2012	Universal Studios Home Entertainment; Dr. Seuss Enterprises	Kyle Balda	Illumination Mac Guff	The Lorax	Home video release
Puppy	December 10, 2013	Universal Studios Home Entertainment	Yarrow Cheney and Bruno Dequier	Illumination Mac Guff	Despicable Me 2	Home video release
Panic in the Mailroom	December 10, 2013	Universal Studios Home Entertainment	Fabrice Joubert and Mark O'Hare	Illumination Mac Guff	Despicable Me 2	Home video release
Training Wheels	December 10, 2013	Universal Studios Home Entertainment	Eric Favela and Régis Schuller	Illumination Mac Guff	Despicable Me 2	Home video release
Cro Minion	December 8, 2015	Universal Studios Home Entertainment	Didier Ah-Koon and Régis Schuller	Illumination Mac Guff	Minions	Home video release
Competition	December 8, 2015	Universal Studios Home Entertainment	Julien Soret and Kyle Balda	Illumination Mac Guff	Minions	Home video release
Binky Nelson Unpacified	December 8, 2015	Universal Studios Home Entertainment	Fabrice Joubert and Brian Lynch	Illumination Mac Guff	Minions	Home video release
Mower Minions	July 8, 2016	Universal Pictures	Bruno Chauffard and Glenn McCoy	Illumination Mac Guff	The Secret Life of Pets	Theatrical release/Home video release
Norman Television	December 6, 2016	Universal Pictures Home Entertainment	Habib Louati and Boris Jacq	Illumination Mac Guff	The Secret Life of Pets	Home video release
Weenie	December 6, 2016	Universal Pictures Home Entertainment	Kyle Balda, Ken Daurio and Cinco Paul	Illumination Mac Guff	The Secret Life of Pets	Home video release
Gunter Babysits	March 21, 2017	Universal Pictures Home Entertainment	Adrien Borzakian and Eric Favela	Illumination Mac Guff	Sing	Home video release
Love at First Sight	March 21, 2017	Universal Pictures Home Entertainment	Benjamin Le Ster and Matthew Nealon	Illumination Mac Guff	Sing	Home video release
Eddie's Life Coach	March 21, 2017	Universal Pictures Home Entertainment	Scott Mosier and Guylo Homsy	Illumination Mac Guff	Sing	Home video release
The Secret Life of Kyle	December 5, 2017	Universal Pictures Home Entertainment	Bruno Chauffard and Glenn McCoy	Illumination Mac Guff	Despicable Me 3	Home video release
Yellow is the New Black	November 9, 2018	Universal Pictures	Serguei Kouchnerov and Fabien Polack	Illumination Mac Guff	The Grinch	Limited theatrical release/Home video release
The Dog Days of Winter	November 23, 2018	NBCUniversal Television Distribution; Dr. Seuss Enterprises	Habib Louati and Thierry Noblet	Illumination Mac Guff	Trolls Holiday	Television release
The Dog Days of Winter	November 23, 2018	NBCUniversal Television Distribution; Dr. Seuss Enterprises	Habib Louati and Thierry Noblet	Illumination Mac Guff	The Grinch	Home video release
Santa's Little Helpers	February 5, 2019	Universal Pictures Home Entertainment	Derek Drymon and Bruno Chauffard	Illumination Mac Guff	The Grinch	Home video release
Super Gidget	August 27, 2019	Universal Pictures Home Entertainment	Glenn McCoy and Boris Jacq	Illumination Mac Guff	The Secret Life of Pets 2	Home video release
Minion Scouts	August 27, 2019	Universal Pictures Home Entertainment	Guy Bar'ely and Frank Baradat	Illumination Mac Guff	The Secret Life of Pets 2	Home video release
Minions & Monsters	June 11, 2021	NBCUniversal Syndication Studios	Jed Diffenderfer and Chloé Lesueur	Illumination Mac Guff	Minions: The Rise of Gru	Television release/Home video release
For Gunter's Eyes Only	March 29, 2022	Universal Pictures Home Entertainment	David Pellé and David Feiss	Illumination Studios Paris	Sing 2	Home video release
Animal Attraction	March 29, 2022	Universal Pictures Home Entertainment	Damien Bapst and Fabrice Joubert	Illumination Studios Paris	Sing 2	Home video release
Post Modern Minion	September 6, 2022	Universal Pictures Home Entertainment	Bastien Laurent and Matthew Nealon	Illumination Studios Paris	Minions: The Rise of Gru	Home video release
Penglai	September 16, 2022	Universal Pictures	Momo Wang	One and All Animation Studio	—N/a	Limited theatrical release
Mooned	December 22, 2023	Universal Pictures	Jonathan del Val	Illumination Studios Paris	Migration	Theatrical release/Home video release
Fly Hard	February 27, 2024	Universal Pictures Home Entertainment	Hélène Galtier and Elisabeth Patte	Illumination Studios Paris	Migration	Home video release
Midnight Mission	February 27, 2024	Universal Pictures Home Entertainment	Céline Allegre and Guylo Homsy	Illumination Studios Paris	Migration	Home video release
Game Over and Over	September 24, 2024	Universal Pictures Home Entertainment	Christophe Delisle, Christophe Lourdelet and Ludovic Roz	Illumination Studios Paris	Despicable Me 4	Home video release
Benny's Birthday	September 24, 2024	Universal Pictures Home Entertainment	Chris Allison and Olivier Luffin	Illumination Studios Paris	Despicable Me 4	Home video release
Sing: Thriller	October 16, 2024	Netflix; Universal Pictures	Garth Jennings	Illumination Studios Paris	—N/a	Streaming release

=== Compilations ===
Title	Release date	Distribution	Animation service	Streaming service	Shorts included
Minions & More 1	September 20, 2022	Universal Pictures	Illumination Studios Paris	Netflix	Puppy; The Dog Days of Winter; Minion Scouts; Norman Television; Training Wheels; Love at First Sight; The Secret Life of Kyle; Weenie; Forces of Nature; Santa's Little Helpers
Minions & More 2	November 8, 2022	Universal Pictures	Illumination Studios Paris	Netflix	Mower Minions; Super Gidget; Yellow is the New Black; Eddie's Life Coach; Competition; Serenade; Cro Minion; Wagon Ho!; Binky Nelson Unpacified; Panic in the Mailroom; Gunter Babysits

== Television specials ==
Title	Release date	Distribution	Animation service	Network	Shorts included
Minions Holiday Special	November 27, 2020	NBCUniversal Television Distribution	Illumination Mac Guff	NBC	Santa's Little Helpers; Training Wheels; Puppy; Minion Scouts

== Series ==
=== Web series ===
Title	Premiere date	End date	Networks
Saturday Morning Minions	June 5, 2021	March 5, 2022	Facebook; Instagram; YouTube
Who's Who?	July 13, 2023	August 3, 2023	TikTok; YouTube
Bones Story	TBA	TBA	TikTok; YouTube

== Unproduced films ==
Title	Description
Emily the Strange	Since 2000, Rob Reger has been trying to make a feature film adaptation of Emily. In 2005, Fox Animation went to make a live action/animated feature film, with Chris Meledandri and John Cohen producing it. Mike Richardson, of Dark Horse Entertainment, came on board as a producer in 2008. The same year it was unofficially reported that the film moved to Universal Studios' owned Illumination Entertainment, along with the studio's founders, Meledandri and Cohen. In September 2010, Universal Studios acquired the rights to the comic, and the actress Chloë Grace Moretz was cast in the role of Emily. Melisa Wallack, who wrote the script for Mirror Mirror, was hired to write the adaptation in the following year in August. Two months later it was confirmed that the film was indeed in the works at Illumination Entertainment. Kealan O'Rourke was brought to rewrite the film's script. By December 2016, Universal abandoned the project, and Dark Horse Entertainment and Amazon Studios were in negotiations to make an animated film. In October 2024, Warner Bros. Pictures Animation and Bad Robot announced their collaboration on a full-length animated feature based on Emily the Strange. The film’s screenplay is being developed by Pamela Ribon, as Bad Robot will produce the film, with Reger serving as executive producer alongside Trevor Duke-Moretz.
Flanimals	An animated feature film based on the book series was in production at Illumination by April 2009. Series creator Ricky Gervais was set to be the executive producer and also lend his voice to the lead character, while Matt Selman (The Simpsons) wrote the script, but the project was later removed from the development schedule.
Where's Waldo?	In June 2009, Universal and Illumination acquired the rights to turn Where's Waldo? into a live-action film, was to be produced by Chris Meledandri with Classic Media's (now DreamWorks Classics) executive producer Eric Ellenbogen, but the project was later cancelled, after DreamWorks Animation bought Classic Media in 2012.
Untitled cryptozoology film	In December 2009, Illumination was producing an animated film based on a pitch by actor-comedian Jack Black and Jason Micallef on cryptozoology, which is the study of legendary creatures whose existence has never been confirmed (i.e. the Loch Ness Monster or Bigfoot). Black intended to produce the film alongside Ben Cooley and Chris Meledandri through his production company Electric Dynamite. Additionally, Black did not intend to provide a voice for the characters as he did with DreamWorks Animation's Kung Fu Panda.
Curious George	By July 2010, Illumination was developing a live-action animated film based on the titular monkey, with Larry Stuckey writing the script, but in November 2015 the film project was cancelled.
Pluto	In October 2010, Illumination Entertainment and Tezuka Productions jointly announced to develop a live-action/animated film of the Japanese manga series Pluto.
The Addams Family	In 2010, Universal and Illumination acquired the underlying rights to the Addams Family drawings. The film was planned to be a stop-motion animated film based on Charles Addams's original drawings. Tim Burton was set to co-write and co-produce the film, with a possibility to direct. By July 2013, the film was cancelled; had been made, this would have been Illumination's first stop-motion animated film. Eventually, Metro-Goldwyn-Mayer picked up rights to the film and an animated film was released in 2019, with Sausage Party directors Greg Tiernan and former DreamWorks Animation staff member Conrad Vernon to direct. Universal handled the international distribution rights for the film, as well as physical home media worldwide distribution rights.
UglyDolls	In May 2011, Illumination acquired the rights to Uglydolls to make an animated feature film, but the project never came to fruition. An animated film based on the toy series became the first family and animation project produced by STX Films and was released in May 2019.
Gospel for Teens	In August 2011, Universal and Illumination acquired the rights to make a live-action film based on the 60 Minutes segment Gospel for Teens. Todd Black was set to produce under his Escape Artists company, with Stephen Belber penning the script.
Dr. Seuss biopic	In October 2011, it was announced that Illumination and Johnny Depp's Infinitum Nihil would co-produce a live-action biopic of Dr. Seuss, with Depp slated to produce and possibly star.
Woody Woodpecker	By November 2011, Universal and Illumination planned a Woody Woodpecker feature film. John Altschuler and Dave Krinsky (King of the Hill) were in talks to develop a story, but in July 2013, Illumination canceled the project. The film was eventually released as a live-action/CGI hybrid film in 2017.
The Cat in the Hat	In March 2012, following the financial success of The Lorax, the animated film adaptation of the book of the same name, Universal and Illumination announced plans to produce an animated adaptation based on The Cat in the Hat. Rob Lieber was set to write the script, with Chris Meledandri as producer, and Audrey Geisel as the executive producer, but the project never came into fruition. By January 2018, Warner Animation Group (now Warner Bros. Pictures Animation) was developing an animated Cat in the Hat film as part of a creative partnership with Seuss Enterprises, which was released on November 6, 2026.
Clifford the Big Red Dog	In May 2012, Universal and Illumination began to develop a live-action/animated feature film based on the eponymous book series. Matt Lopez was hired to write the script, while Chris Meledandri and Deborah Forte were attached to produce the film. In July 2013, Illumination dropped the project. Paramount Pictures later acquired the rights to develop the film, which was eventually released on November 10, 2021, following a number of delays due to the ongoing COVID-19 pandemic.
Lockwood & Co.: The Screaming Staircase	The film rights of The Screaming Staircase, the first book in the Lockwood & Co. series by Jonathan Stroud, were acquired in December 2012 by Illumination and Universal, making this the first live-action project for the former. The film, titled Lockwood & Co.: The Screaming Staircase, was to be produced by Chris Meledandri. However, in September 2017 it was announced that Big Talk Productions had optioned the rights to Lockwood & Co., with plans to adapt it into a television series. In December 2020, the show was announced to be going to Netflix, adapted by Joe Cornish. Filming began on the Lockwood & Co. television series in the week following 5 July 2021, and it premiered on 27 January 2023.
Johnny Express	In 2015, Universal and Illumination planned to adapt the South Korean CGI animated short into a feature-length animated film.
Untitled Pharrell Williams project	In 2018, it was reported that an original project with Pharrell Williams was being worked on, being "made from scratch". Nothing materialized, and six years later, an unrelated animated project starring Williams, Piece by Piece was released by Universal, though LEGO versions of Kevin, Stuart, and Bob from the Despeciable Me franchise make cameo appearances in the film.
Big Tree	In 2022, Universal and Illumination planned to develop a movie in co-production with Steven Spielberg's own Amblin Entertainment an animated feature based on Brian Selznick's novel of the same name, which was inspired by an idea from both Spielberg and Meledandri. Nothing was materialized as of 2026.

== Reception ==
=== Box office performance ===
Film	Budget	North America		Overseas gross (unadjusted)	Worldwide gross (unadjusted)	Ref.
Film	Budget	Opening	Gross (unadjusted)	Overseas gross (unadjusted)	Worldwide gross (unadjusted)	Ref.
Despicable Me	$69 million	$56.3 million	$251.6 million	$291.6 million	$543.2 million	
Hop	$63 million	$37.5 million	$108.5 million	$75.8 million	$184.4 million	
The Lorax	$70 million	$70.2 million	$214.4 million	$134.8 million	$349.2 million	
Despicable Me 2	$76 million	$83.5 million	$368.1 million	$602.7 million	$970.8 million	
Minions	$74 million	$115.7 million	$336.0 million	$823.4 million	$1.159 billion	
The Secret Life of Pets	$75 million	$104.4 million	$368.4 million	$525.9 million	$894.3 million	
Sing	$75 million	$35.2 million	$270.4 million	$363.8 million	$634.2 million	
Despicable Me 3	$80 million	$72.4 million	$264.6 million	$770.2 million	$1.034 billion	
The Grinch	$75 million	$67.6 million	$271.5 million	$255.4 million	$527.8 million	
The Secret Life of Pets 2	$80 million	$46.7 million	$159.2 million	$287.2 million	$446.4 million	
Sing 2	$85 million	$22.3 million	$162.8 million	$245.6 million	$408.4 million	
Minions: The Rise of Gru	$80–100 million	$107.0 million	$370.3 million	$569.9 million	$940.5 million	
The Super Mario Bros. Movie	$100 million	$146.4 million	$574.9 million	$785.9 million	$1.360 billion	
Migration	$72 million	$12.5 million	$127.6 million	$172.9 million	$300.5 million	
Despicable Me 4	$100 million	$75.0 million	$361.0 million	$611.0 million	$972.0 million	
The Super Mario Galaxy Movie	$110 million	$131.7 million	$428.0 million	$567.0 million	$1.011 billion	
Minions & Monsters	$85 million	$37.0 million	$138.2 million	$222.1 million	$360.3 million	

=== Critical and public response ===
Film	Critical		Public
Film	Rotten Tomatoes	Metacritic	CinemaScore
Despicable Me	80% (200 reviews)	72 (35 reviews)	A
Hop	24% (140 reviews)	41 (23 reviews)	A−
The Lorax	53% (155 reviews)	46 (30 reviews)	A
Despicable Me 2	75% (184 reviews)	62 (39 reviews)	A
Minions	55% (223 reviews)	56 (35 reviews)	A
The Secret Life of Pets	71% (239 reviews)	61 (39 reviews)	A−
Sing	71% (187 reviews)	59 (37 reviews)	A
Despicable Me 3	58% (193 reviews)	49 (37 reviews)	A–
The Grinch	59% (197 reviews)	51 (32 reviews)	A−
The Secret Life of Pets 2	60% (164 reviews)	55 (26 reviews)	A−
Sing 2	72% (137 reviews)	49 (28 reviews)	A+
Minions: The Rise of Gru	70% (184 reviews)	56 (41 reviews)	A
The Super Mario Bros. Movie	59% (287 reviews)	46 (53 reviews)	A
Migration	73% (103 reviews)	56 (25 reviews)	A
Despicable Me 4	56% (166 reviews)	52 (36 reviews)	A
The Super Mario Galaxy Movie	42% (189 reviews)	37 (45 reviews)	A−
Minions & Monsters	89% (162 reviews)	70 (30 reviews)	A−

== See also ==
- List of Universal Pictures theatrical animated feature films
- List of DreamWorks Animation productions
