= Illumination Studios Paris =

French animation company

- Logo used since 2021
- Formerly: Illumination Mac Guff (2011–2021)
- Type: Subsidiary
- Industry: VFX; CGI animation
- Predecessor: Mac Guff (animation studio)
- Founded: 2011; 15 years ago
- Founder: Jacques Bled
- Headquarters: Paris, France
- Key people: Janet Healy (co-president); Jacques Bled (co-president)
- Number of employees: 850 (2016)
- Parent: Illumination
- Website: illuminationstudiosparis.com

Illumination Studios Paris (formerly known as Illumination Mac Guff) is a French animated feature production company owned by Illumination, an "exclusive financing and distribution" partner of Universal Pictures, making the major American film backer and releaser its only client. Based in Paris, France, the company was created in 2011 as part of Universal's purchase of the animation arm of French animation and VFX company Mac Guff and subsequent contribution of the production house to Illumination. It is responsible for the animation on Illumination's feature-length animated films and associated short films, most notably the Despicable Me franchise.

== History ==
=== Mac Guff era (2011–2021) ===
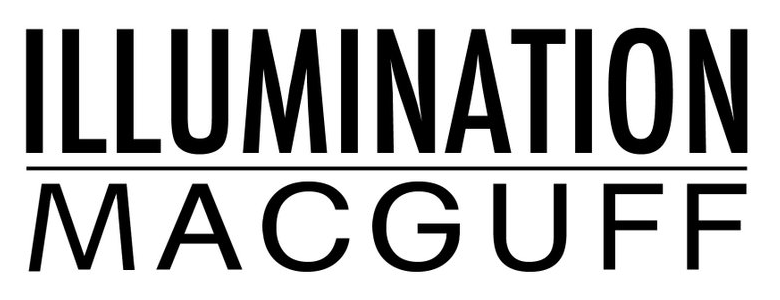
Previous logo as Illumination Mac Guff (2011–2021)

Following their work with Illumination on Despicable Me (2010) and its associated short films, Universal purchased the animation arm of Mac Guff, aptly renaming it Illumination Mac Guff. The first film produced by the new studio was The Lorax (2012). All subsequent films by Illumination have had most of their animation work outsourced to the studio, as it benefits from French subsidies.

=== Studios Paris era (2021–present) ===
With the release of Sing 2 in December 2021, the studio was renamed Illumination Studios Paris.

== Filmography ==
=== Feature films ===
==== Released ====
Title	Release date	Director(s)	Producer(s)	Budget	Gross (unadjusted)
The Lorax	March 2, 2012	Chris Renaud Co-Director: Kyle Balda	Chris Meledandri; Janet Healy	$70 million	$349.2 million
Despicable Me 2	July 3, 2013	Chris Renaud; Pierre Coffin	Chris Meledandri; Janet Healy	$76 million	$970.8 million
Minions	July 10, 2015	Pierre Coffin; Kyle Balda	Chris Meledandri; Janet Healy	$74 million	$1.159 billion
The Secret Life of Pets	July 8, 2016	Chris Renaud Co-Director: Yarrow Cheney	Chris Meledandri; Janet Healy	$75 million	$894.3 million
Sing	December 21, 2016	Garth Jennings Co-Director: Christophe Lourdelet	Chris Meledandri; Janet Healy	$75 million	$634.2 million
Despicable Me 3	June 30, 2017	Pierre Coffin; Kyle Balda Co-Director: Eric Guillon	Chris Meledandri; Janet Healy	$80 million	$1.035 billion
The Grinch	November 9, 2018	Scott Mosier; Yarrow Cheney	Chris Meledandri; Janet Healy	$75 million	$526.7 million
The Secret Life of Pets 2	June 7, 2019	Chris Renaud Co-Director: Jonathan del Val	Chris Meledandri; Janet Healy	$80 million	$431.1 million
Sing 2	December 22, 2021	Garth Jennings Co-Director: Christophe Lourdelet	Chris Meledandri; Janet Healy	$85 million	$407.6 million
Minions: The Rise of Gru	July 1, 2022	Kyle Balda Co-Directors: Brad Ableson; Jonathan del Val	Chris Meledandri; Janet Healy; Chris Renaud	$80 million	$939.6 million
The Super Mario Bros. Movie	April 5, 2023	Aaron Horvath; Michael Jelenic Co-Directors: Pierre Leduc; Fabien Polack	Chris Meledandri; Shigeru Miyamoto	$100 million	$1.362 billion
Migration	December 22, 2023	Benjamin Renner Co-director: Guylo Homsy	Chris Meledandri	$72 million	$300.2 million
Despicable Me 4	July 3, 2024	Chris Renaud Co-director: Patrick Delage	Chris Meledandri; Brett Hoffman	$100 million	$971 million
The Super Mario Galaxy Movie	April 1, 2026	Aaron Horvath; Michael Jelenic Co-Directors: Pierre Leduc; Fabien Polack	Chris Meledandri; Shigeru Miyamoto	$110 million	$1.013 billion
Minions & Monsters	July 1, 2026	Pierre Coffin Co-director: Patrick Delage	Chris Meledandri; Bill Ryan	$85 million	$530 million

==== Upcoming ====
Title	Release date	Director(s)	Producers	Ref(s)
Not Alone	April 16, 2027	Eric Guillon; Claire Dodgson; Jonathan Del Val	Chris Meledandri	

=== Short films ===
#	Title	Release date	Release with	Note
1	Wagon Ho!	August 7, 2012	Dr. Seuss' The Lorax	Home media release
2	Forces of Nature	August 7, 2012	Dr. Seuss' The Lorax	Home media release
3	Serenade	August 7, 2012	Dr. Seuss' The Lorax	Home media release
4	Puppy	December 10, 2013	Despicable Me 2	Home media release
5	Panic in the Mailroom	December 10, 2013	Despicable Me 2	Home media release
6	Training Wheels	December 10, 2013	Despicable Me 2	Home media release
7	Cro Minion	December 8, 2015	Minions	Home media release
8	Competition	December 8, 2015	Minions	Home media release
9	Binky Nelson Unpacified	December 8, 2015	Minions	Home media release
10	Mower Minions	July 8, 2016	The Secret Life of Pets	Theatrical release
11	Norman Television	December 6, 2016	The Secret Life of Pets	Home media release
12	Weenie	December 6, 2016	The Secret Life of Pets	Home media release
13	Gunter Babysits	March 21, 2017	Sing	Home media release
14	Love at First Sight	March 21, 2017	Sing	Home media release
15	Eddie's Life Coach	March 21, 2017	Sing	Home media release
16	The Secret Life of Kyle	December 5, 2017	Despicable Me 3	Home media release
17	Yellow is the New Black	November 9, 2018	The Grinch	Theatrical release
18	The Dog Days of Winter	November 23, 2018	Trolls Holiday	Television release
19	Santa's Little Helpers	February 5, 2019	The Grinch	Home media release
20	Super Gidget	August 27, 2019	The Secret Life of Pets 2	Home media release
21	Minion Scouts	August 27, 2019	The Secret Life of Pets 2	Home media release
22	Minions & Monsters	June 11, 2021	Minions: The Rise of Gru	Television/Home media release
23	For Gunter's Eyes Only	March 29, 2022	Sing 2	Home media release
24	Animal Attraction	March 29, 2022	Sing 2	Home media release
25	Post Modern Minion	September 6, 2022	Minions: The Rise of Gru	Home media release
26	Mooned	December 22, 2023	Migration	Theatrical release
27	Fly Hard	February 27, 2024	Migration	Home media release
28	Midnight Mission	February 27, 2024	Migration	Home media release
29	Game Over and Over	September 24, 2024	Despicable Me 4	Home media release
30	Benny's Birthday	September 24, 2024	Despicable Me 4	Home media release

=== Television specials ===
#	Title	Release date	Network	Note
1	Minions Holiday Special	November 27, 2020	NBC	
2	Minions & More 1	September 22, 2022	Netflix	
3	Minions & More 2	November 8, 2022	Netflix	
4	Paris 2024 Olympics Opening Ceremony	July 26, 2024	Various across the world	Animated sequence with the Minions for the "Fraternité" segment
5	Sing: Thriller	October 16, 2024	Netflix	

== Commercials ==
Title	Year	Commissioned for
Mazda CX-5 - The Lorax	2012	Mazda
The Lorax at IHOP	2012	IHOP
The Lorax GE Lightbulb	2012	GE Lighting
AMC Policy Trailer - Dr. Seuss' The Lorax	2012	AMC Theatres
Minions The Stars are Brighter	2013	Cinemark
Despicable Me 2 fruitsnackia	2013	Fruit Roll Ups
Despicable Me 2 Happy Meal	2013	McDonald's
Despicable Me 2 McDonald's Milk	2013	McDonald's
Despicable Me 2 - Progressive Name Your Price Tool	2013	Progressive
Despicable Me 2 Gogurt	2013	Gogurt
AMC Policy Spot - Minions vs. Evil Minion	2013	AMC
Minions - Tree Lighting Ceremony	2014	
Minions Fruitsnackia	2015	Fruit Roll Ups
Tic Tac Minions	2015	Tic Tac
General Mills Minions	2015	General Mills
GoGurt Minions	2015	GoGurt
Minions Drive Thru	2015	McDonald's
OASIS - LES TRONIONS - MINIONS	2015	Oasis Be Fruit
Minions Favorite Show	2015	Xfinity
Minions XFINITY	2015	Xfinity
Minions Movie Watching Experience	2015	Cinemark
Minions Then and Now	2015	Odeon Cinemas
Minions Paradise Trailer	2015	Minions Paradise
Minions Super Bowl Commercial	2015	
Minions Happy Meal	2015	McDonald's
Minions Godzilla	2015	Toho Cinemas
Minions Fastest in-home Wi-Fi	2015	Xfinity
Minions Sky Fiber	2015	Sky UK
Minions Vivo 1	2015	Vivo
Minions Vivo 2	2015	Vivo
Provided the animation for Kevin, Stuart and Bob presenting the award for Best Animated Short Film.	2016	88th Academy Awards
The Secret Life of Pets PetSmart	2016	PetSmart
The Secret Life of Pets - Cinemark	2016	Cinemark
The Secret Life of Pets - Xfinity	2016	Xfinity
Sky Broadband - The Secret Life Of Pets	2016	Sky Broadband
Sky Fibre Max The Secret Life Of Pets	2016	Sky Broadband
The Secret Life Of Pets Sports	2016	
The Secret Life Of Pets Switch Squad	2016	Sky Broadband
Sky Talk - The Secret Life Of Pets	2016	Sky Broadband
The Secret Life Of Pets Happy	2016	McDonald's
The Secret Life Of Pets Happy Meal	2016	McDonald's
Find your Spot for The Secret Life of Pets	2016	Cinemark
The Secret Life of Pets x Furbo Dog Camera	2016	Furbo
Sing for the Gold	2016	
Sing Drive-Trough	2016	McDonald's
Sing Christmas	2016	
Happy Meal Sing	2016	McDonald's
Despicable Me 3™ Tic Tac® Mints	2017	Tic Tacs
Sky Talk Shield & Despicable Me 3	2017	Sky UK
Oasis x Despicable Me 3	2017	Oasis
Despicable Me 3 Honda	2017	Honda
This is My Secret Weapon	2017	Xfinity
Despicable Me 3 Cinemark	2017	Cinemark
Bonafont Kids – Mi Villano Favorito 3	2017	Bonafont
Oasis Moi Moche et Méchant 2	2013	Oasis
Caso Cerrado Minions	2017	
Sky Fibre Despicable Me 3	2017	Sky Fibre
McDonald's Shake it Up	2017	McDonald's
Despicable Me 3 Happy Meal	2017	McDonald's
The Grinch Xfinity 1	2018	Xfinity
The Grinch Xfinity 2	2018	Xfinity
The Grinch Xfinity 3	2018	Xfinity
The Grinch Pistachios	2018	Wonderful Pistachios
The Grinch Pistachios 2	2018	Wonderful Pistachios
The Grinch Ebates	2018	Ebates
The Grinch 23 and Me	2018	23andMe
The Grinch Corn Chex	2018	Chex
The Grinch Olympics	2018	
The Grinch PVR	2018	PVR Cinemas
The Grinch Barkbox	2018	Barkbox
Sky Broadband - The Secret Life of Pets 2	2019	Sky UK
Sky Broadband WiFi Guarantee - The Secret Life of Pets 2	2019	Sky UK
The Secret Life of Pets 2 at ODEON Cinemas	2019	ODEON Cinemas
The Secret Life Of Pets 2 McDonald's	2019	McDonald's
Secret Life of Pets 2: Protect Your Pets	2019	Progressive
The Secret Life of Pets 2 Xfinity	2019	Xfinity
The Secret Life of Pets 2 Village Cinemas	2019	Village Cinemas
Watch Sing 2 in GSC	2021	GSCinemas
Sing 2 Happy Meal	2021	McDonald's
Come Home	2021	Xfinity
Sky Broadband Minions "Loft To Lair"	2022	Sky UK
The GOAT (Michael Jordan, Kareem Abdul-Jabbar, LeBron James)	2022	
HelloFresh x Minions	2022	HelloFresh
Minions: The Rise of Gru + Liberty Mutual Insurance	2022	Liberty Mutual Insurance
Minions: The Rise of Gru - Xfinity	2022	Xfinity
Sky Minion-proof Wifi	2021	Sky UK
Minions: The Rise of Gru Crossover Spot: The Office	2022	
McDonald’s Happy Meal - Minions: The Rise of Gru	2020	McDonald’s Happy Meal
IHOP - Minions Love	2022	IHOP
Minions: The Rise of Gru Popcorn	2022	
Regal Minions Rollercoaster	2022	Regal Theatres
Sky Broadband 'Gigafast'	2022	Sky UK
Steve Carell and Bob	2022	
Illumination's Ultimate Movie Night	2023	
The Super Mario Bros. Movie - McDonald's	2023	McDonald's
Migration Jersey Mike's	2023	Jersey Mike's
Migration - Dawn	2023	Dawn
Migration - "I Love You Always Forever"	2023	
Migration Xfinity	2023	Xfinity
Migration PVR Cinemas	2023	PVR Cinemas
King’s Hawaiian & Despicable Me 4 – Competition	2024	King’s Hawaiian
Despicable Me 4 - Arms Race Spot	2024	
Room for More	2024	Volkswagen USA
Despicable Me 4 - Paris Olympics Spot	2024	
Therapy With Nikola Jokić	2024	
Despicable Me 4 Xfinity	2024	Xfinity
Despicable Me 4 Accelerator	2024	Sky UK
Minion Punished In Box Of Shame	2024	Sky UK
Despicable Me 4 McDonald's	2024	McDonald's
Despicable Me 4 Minion Intelligence	2024	
Chinese New Year	2025	Volkswagen China
NBA returns to NBC promo	2025	NBC
Minions x Chloe Kim 2026 Milan Cortina Winter Olympics Spot	2025	
Minions & Monsters - Big Game Spot	2026	
