= Taron Egerton =

Welsh actor and singer (born 1989)

- Egerton in 2026
- Born: 10 November 1989 (age 37); Birkenhead, Merseyside, England
- Education: Royal Academy of Dramatic Art
- Occupations: Actor; singer; producer
- Years active: 2012–present
- Awards: Full list

Taron Egerton (/ˈɛdʒərtən/ EJ-ər-tən; born 10 November 1989) is a Welsh actor and singer. A graduate of the Royal Academy of Dramatic Art, he performed in stage plays before gaining recognition for his starring role as a spy in the action comedy films Kingsman: The Secret Service (2014) and Kingsman: The Golden Circle (2017). He has also voiced characters in animated projects like the Sing franchise (2016–present) and The Dark Crystal: Age of Resistance (2019).

Egerton has appeared in several biographical films, portraying military officer Edward Brittain in the drama Testament of Youth (2014), the titular ski-jumper in the sports film Eddie the Eagle (2016), and singer Elton John in the musical Rocketman (2019). The last of these earned him a Golden Globe Award for Best Actor. He has also starred as Jimmy Keene in the miniseries Black Bird (2022), for which he was nominated for a Primetime Emmy Award, as Henk Rogers in the biopic Tetris (2023), and as art gallery employee Adam Samuels in Everybody Wants to Fuck Me (2026). He has had major roles in the Netflix original thriller films Carry-On (2024) and Apex (2026), portraying protagonist Ethan Kopek in the former and villain Ben in the latter.

== Early life and education ==
Egerton was born on 10 November 1989 in Birkenhead. His mother Christine worked in social services, while his father David ran a bed-and-breakfast near Liverpool; both of them are Liverpool natives. He has two younger half-sisters. His grandmother was from Wales. A speaker of the Welsh language, Egerton considers himself Welsh.

His parents divorced when he was two, and he subsequently moved with his mother to the Welsh island of Anglesey, where he went to primary school. The family then relocated to Aberystwyth when he was twelve years old. According to Egerton, he became lonely and was bullied for being "artsy" and "feminine" at that age; in 2026, he said on the Armchair Expert podcast that the bullying from his childhood caused insecurities that continue to affect his personal views on masculinity and his romantic relationships. In his mid-teens, he received therapy due to anxiety symptoms "bordering on OCD", such as obsessively washing his hands.

He also questioned his sexual orientation in this period; he has attributed this to his lack of interest in traditionally masculine activities such as football when he was growing up. He began acting at the age of fifteen, which he has partially attributed to a desire to socialise. He attended the Royal Academy of Dramatic Art (RADA). In May 2011, Egerton—at the time a second-year student at RADA—won Student Performer of the Year at the Stephen Sondheim Society's annual singing competition held at the Sondheim Theatre in London. He graduated from the school in 2012. Egerton has described his background as working-class.

== Career ==
=== 2012–2018: Early work and Kingsman films ===
Egerton at San Diego Comic-Con (SDCC) in 2014

Egerton performed in a stage production of the play The Last of the Haussmans at the National Theatre in London in 2012. After appearing in the crime drama series Lewis, he was cast as the lead role in Matthew Vaughn's Kingsman: The Secret Service, an action comedy film adaptation of the comic book The Secret Service by Mark Millar and Dave Gibbons, in 2013. He portrayed English war nurse Vera Brittain's younger brother, British Army officer Edward, in the 2014 biographical drama film Testament of Youth, earning a nomination for Best British Newcomer at the BFI London Film Festival.

In December that year, Kingsman: The Secret Service premiered at the film event Butt-Numb-A-Thon in Texas, United States. The film received a wide international release in February 2015, garnering favourable reviews that described it as "fun, stylish and subversive" as well as grossing over $400 million. Writing for TheWrap, James Rocchi deemed Egerton to be "a naturally charismatic presence" as Gary "Eggsy" Unwin, a recruit for an espionage organisation. Egerton rose to fame with the role; in 2026, he revealed that filming had been a difficult process with Vaughn repeatedly sending him home and threatening to fire him, as he had recently broken up with his girlfriend and had been "aggressively partying" to cope. Later in 2015, he played Edward "Mad Teddy" Smith in the biographical crime film Legend, with Tom Hardy starring as both Kray twins. According to Egerton, he considered it his "job" to "subvert" the hyper-masculinity in the film, as he was portraying one of the twins' lovers. The Hollywood Reporter's Leslie Felperin gave Legend a negative review and criticised its "incoherent" tone and acting, though she remarked that Egerton's performance as Smith is "admittedly[...] one of the film's brighter sparks".

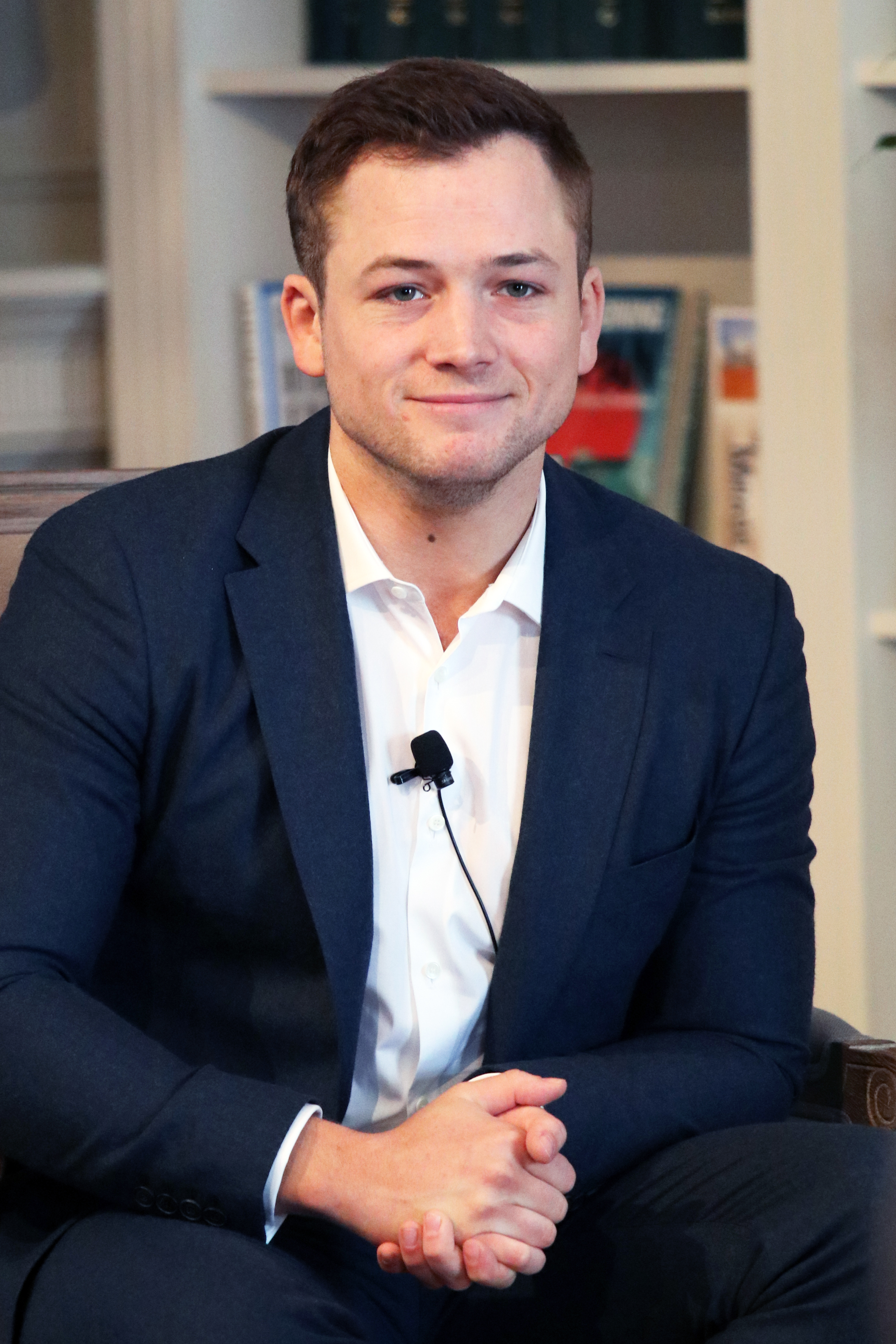
Egerton at the 2018 Global Education and Skills Forum

At the 69th British Academy Film Awards in 2016, Egerton received a nomination for the BAFTA Rising Star Award. In the same year, he played ski-jumper Eddie the Eagle in the eponymous biopic and voiced Johnny, a passionate gorilla, in the animated musical film Sing. Egerton reprised the role of Eggsy in the film Kingsman: The Golden Circle, a sequel to Kingsman: The Secret Service, released the following year. It drew a mixed response from critics. In 2018, he starred in the crime drama film Billionaire Boys Club and played the title character in the action-adventure film Robin Hood. Both films were commercial failures and panned by critics. In the following year, Egerton claimed that Robin Hood had been pitched to him differently and that the film "lost its vision". He attributed his involvement in Billionaire Boys Club and Robin Hood to monetary reasons.

=== 2019–2023: Career expansion ===
Egerton starred as singer Elton John in the biographical musical film Rocketman. He learned to play the piano for the part and sang live in each take during filming. The film was released in 2019, receiving positive reviews, and the actor's portrayal of John earned praise. The Washington Post's Ann Hornaday opined that Egerton "exerts a steadying, singularly charismatic force" in the role, while Richard Lawson of Vanity Fair described his portrayal as "nuanced and emotionally intelligent". Egerton won the Golden Globe Award for Best Actor – Motion Picture Musical or Comedy for his performance. He also garnered a British Academy Film Award nomination for Best Actor in a Leading Role and a Grammy Award nomination for Best Compilation Soundtrack for Visual Media for his work on the film's soundtrack.

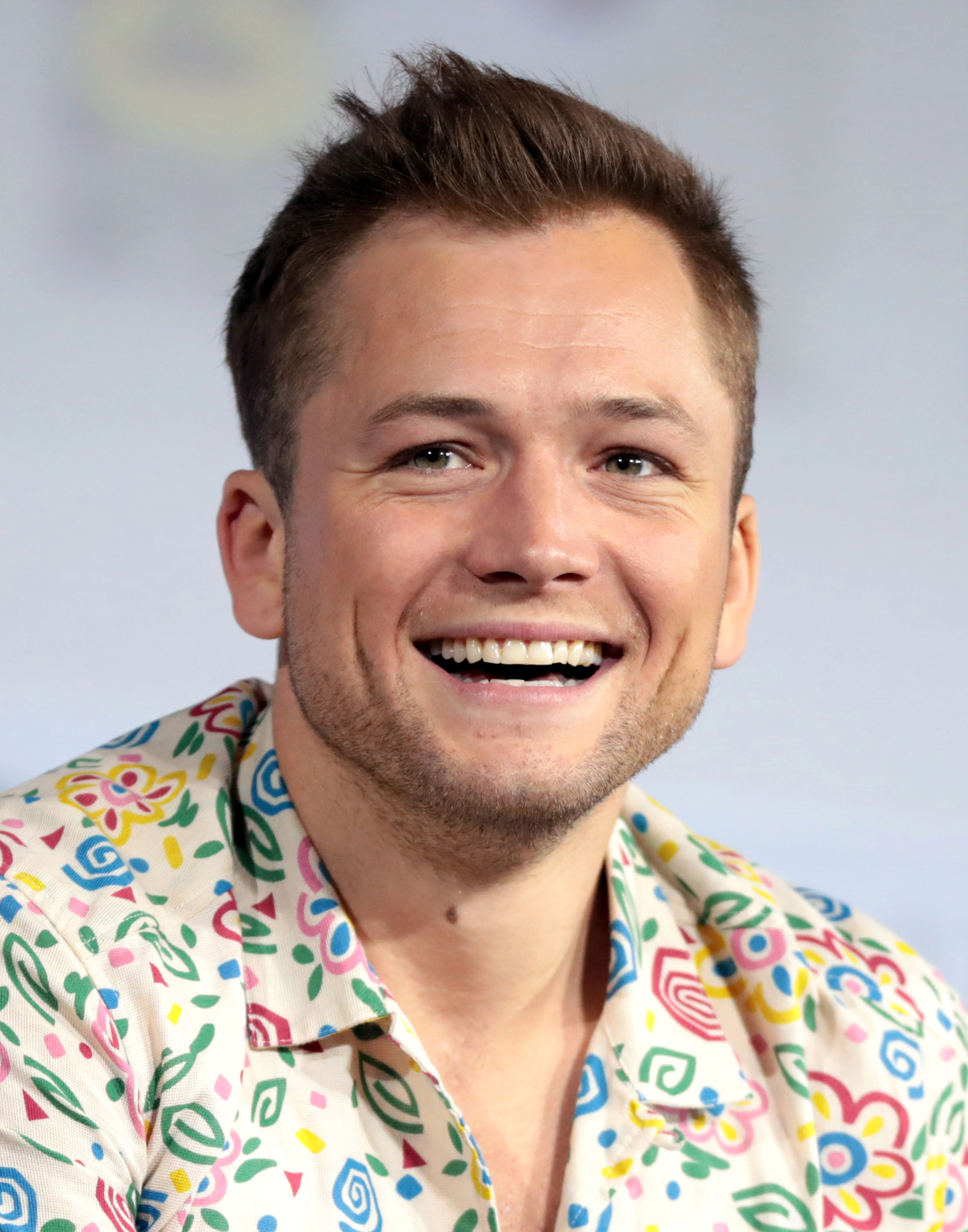
Egerton at the 2019 San Diego Comic-Con

Also in 2019, Egerton voiced Moomintroll in the animated series Moominvalley and Rian in the fantasy series The Dark Crystal: Age of Resistance. He reprised the role of Johnny in Sing 2, which was released in 2021. Egerton starred in the play Cock by Mike Bartlett. Directed by Marianne Elliott and held at the Ambassadors Theatre in the West End, the production marked his West End debut. After missing performances due to fainting on stage during the first night of performances in March 2022 and testing positive for COVID-19 later that month, Egerton exited for "personal reasons" the following month. The production of Cock garnered mixed critical reception, with Egerton's performance gaining praise. The Guardian's Arifa Akbar wrote he "is especially affecting in his romantic desperation".

Egerton executive produced and portrayed American drug dealer Jimmy Keene in the miniseries Black Bird, an adaptation of Keene's memoir In with the Devil. It premiered on Apple TV+ in 2022. Reviewing the series, Saloni Gajjar of The A.V. Club wrote that Egerton "aces Jimmy's duality". He received a nomination for the Primetime Emmy Award for Outstanding Lead Actor in a Limited or Anthology Series or Movie. The following year, Egerton portrayed entrepreneur Henk Rogers in the biographical film Tetris, about the video game of the same name, which also released on Apple TV+. Lovia Gyarke of The Hollywood Reporter commended him for playing Rogers with an "earnest goofiness".

=== 2024–present: Breakthrough with Netflix and Apple TV+ ===
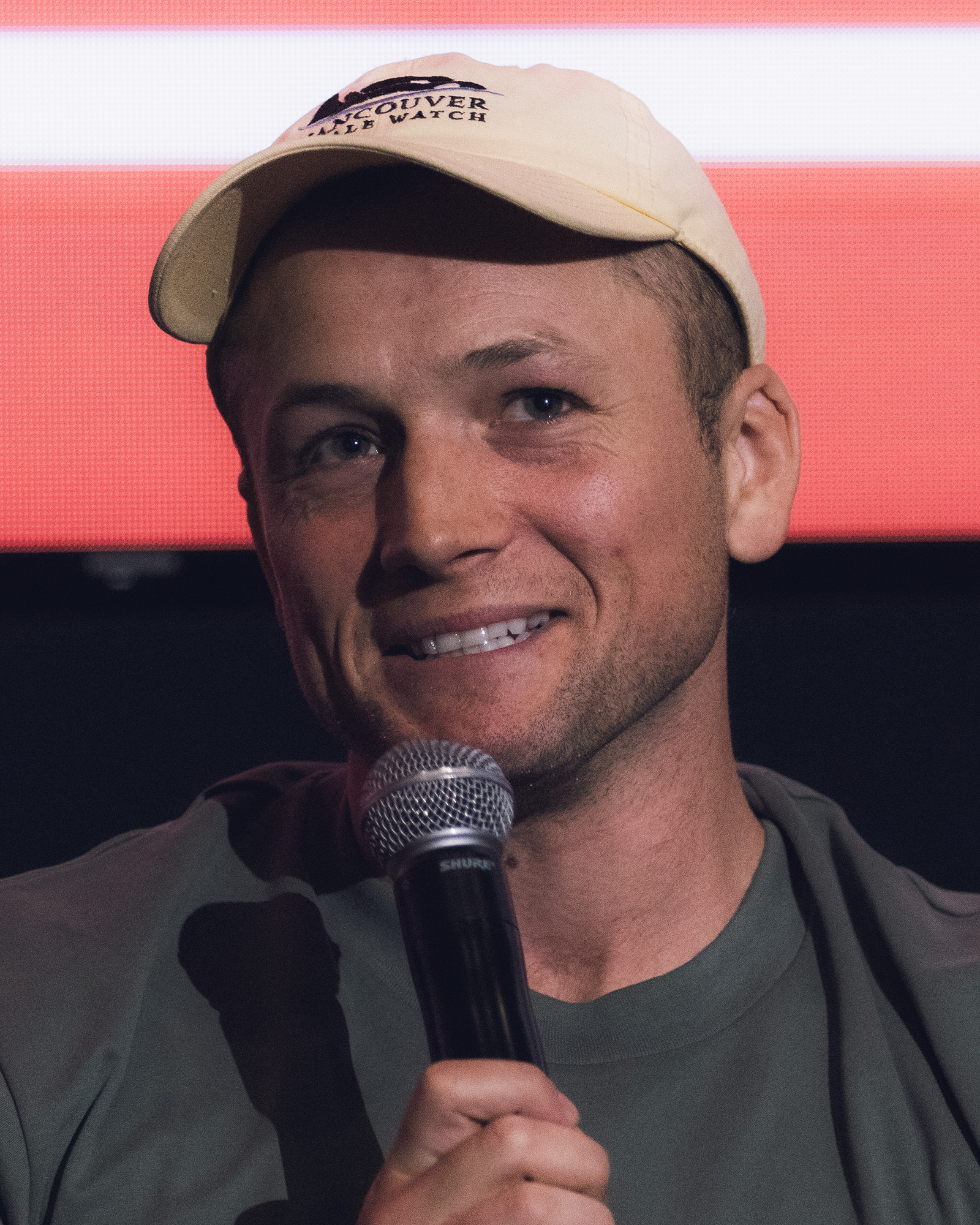
Egerton in 2025

In the Netflix thriller film Carry-On (2024), Egerton starred as Ethan Kopek, a TSA agent blackmailed by a mysterious traveller. He deemed it a rare opportunity to lead a film aimed at a wide audience. Nick Schager of The Daily Beast wrote that "Egerton exudes the right mix of stuck-in-a-rut defeatism and harried determination to hold the film together". On Netflix, Carry-On became the fifth-most-watched English-language film of all time. In 2025, he starred in the Apple TV+ miniseries Smoke (2025) and the crime thriller film She Rides Shotgun.

In April 2026, he portrayed the villain Ben in the Netflix original survival thriller film Apex, with Charlize Theron in the lead role. As of August, it was reportedly the year's third most-watched film on the streaming service so far. In the week following its release, the 2015 song "Go" by The Chemical Brothers saw a 429% surge in its streaming numbers, which media outlets attributed to the virality of an Apex clip in which Egerton's character dances to it. Critics were enthusiastic about his performance as well; Empire and The Hollywood Reporter both opined that his "boyish" appeal provided an effective contrast to his character's sadistic behaviour.

Later in the year, Egerton starred in the dark comedy thriller film Everybody Wants to Fuck Me. He portrays Adam Samuels, an art gallery employee in London who uses his seemingly progressive persona to seduce and manipulate women. Following a strange night with vengeful Sofia (Jessica Henwick), he is suddenly subjected to uncontrollable sexual interest from the women around him. The film premiered at the 2026 Toronto International Film Festival and is awaiting wider distribution. Early reviews criticised the film's execution of its themes, though Egerton received acclaim for his acting, with ComingSoon.net reporting that he has made "a stronger impression" on critics than the film itself.

He will next appear in a major role in the upcoming crime film Kockroach, and in a guest role in season two of the American comedy programme I Love LA.

== Public image ==
In a 2019 interview with British GQ, Egerton said that he didn't consider himself a "bro" or "stunt guy", with writer Chris Mandle saying that the actor felt "misrepresented" by his reputation as an action film star. He has also spoken to the media about his body image issues multiple times, stating on the Armchair Expert podcast that he has experienced "self-loathing" due to his workout routines across films, from Kingsman: The Secret Service (2014) to Apex (2026). Despite this, Egerton has earned sustained media attention for his physical fitness and perceived good looks, particularly the square or "geometric" shape of his jaw. (Note: Attributed to Variety, Out, Decider, Collider, and IndieWire) In 2026, JoBlo.com's Chris Bumbray characterised Egerton as "handsome in a kind of non-threatening way".

Egerton in 2017, at a press conference for Kingsman: The Golden Circle in South Korea

Various media outlets have also noted Egerton's perceived charisma. In a BBC Radio 1 review of Kingsman: The Golden Circle, Ali Plumb described him as "appallingly charming" and opined that he stands out even when surrounded by other "charm machines" such as Jeff Bridges and Channing Tatum. Karen Han of SlashFilm described his onscreen appeal as "endless". Egerton was named one of the 50 best-dressed British men in 2015 and 2016 by British GQ. Having lost a grandmother to motor neurone disease, he is an ambassador for the Motor Neurone Disease Association. Egerton is particularly popular in South Korea, with the country's media giving him the Korean name 김태론 ("Kim Tae-ron") in the 2010s.

== Personal life ==
Egerton has repeatedly expressed support for the LGBTQ+ community, though he has clarified that he is heterosexual, following widespread speculation about his sexuality in 2018. As of 2026, he has been estranged from his father for "a number of years".

== Acting credits ==
=== Film ===
Year	Title	Role	Notes	Ref.
2014	Testament of Youth	Edward Brittain		
2014	Kingsman: The Secret Service	Gary "Eggsy" Unwin		
2014	Legend	Edward "Mad Teddy" Smith		
2016	Eddie the Eagle	Michael "Eddie" Edwards / Eddie the Eagle		
2016	Sing	Johnny (voice)		
2017	Kingsman: The Golden Circle	Gary "Eggsy" Unwin		
2018	Billionaire Boys Club	Dean Karny		
2018	Robin Hood	Robin Hood		
2019	Rocketman	Elton John		
2021	Sing 2	Johnny (voice)		
2023	Tetris	Henk Rogers	Also executive producer	
2024	Sing: Thriller	Johnny (voice)	Short film	
2024	Carry-On	Ethan Kopek		
2025	She Rides Shotgun	Nate McClusky	Also executive producer	
2026	Apex	Ben		
2026	Everybody Wants to Fuck Me	Adam Samuels		
TBA	Kockroach	TBA		

=== Television ===
Year	Title	Role	Notes	Ref.
2013	Lewis	Liam Jay	2 episodes	
2014	The Smoke	Dennis "Asbo" Severs		
2018	Watership Down	El-Ahrairah	Miniseries; voice role	
2019	The Dark Crystal: Age of Resistance	Rian	Voice role	
2019–2020	Moominvalley	Moomintroll	Voice role	
2022	Black Bird	Jimmy Keene	Miniseries; also executive producer	
2025	Smoke	Dave Gudsen	Miniseries; also executive producer	
TBA	I Love LA	TBA	In production; guest role in season two	

=== Theatre ===
Year	Title	Role	Notes	Ref.
2012	The Last of the Haussmans	Danny	Royal National Theatre	
2013	No Quarter	Tommy	Royal Court Theatre	
2022	Cock	M	Ambassadors Theatre	

=== Music videos ===
Year	Song	Artist	Ref.
2015	"The Breach"	Lazy Habits	
2019	"(I'm Gonna) Love Me Again"	Elton John, Taron Egerton	

=== Audio ===
Year	Title	Role	Notes	Ref.
2019	Me	Narrator	Audiobook	
2020	The Sandman	John Constantine	Audio series	

== Discography ==
=== Soundtrack albums ===
Title	Album details	Peak chart positions										Certifications
Title	Album details	UK	AUS	AUT	FRA	GER	ITA	NLD	NZ	SWI	US	Certifications
Rocketman (with Elton John)	Released: 24 May 2019; Label: Virgin EMI, Interscope; Formats: CD, LP, digital download	5	6	38	55	67	80	81	9	32	50	BPI: Gold
"—" denotes items which were not released in that country or failed to chart.

=== Guest appearances ===
Title	Year	Other artist(s)	Album
"Thrill Me"	2016	Orchestral Manoeuvres in the Dark, Hugh Jackman	Fly (Songs Inspired by the Film Eddie the Eagle)
"The Way I Feel Inside"	2016	None	Sing: Original Motion Picture Soundtrack
"I'm Still Standing"	2016	None	Sing: Original Motion Picture Soundtrack
"Let's Go Crazy"	2022	Tori Kelly, Reese Witherspoon, Nick Kroll	Sing 2: Original Motion Picture Soundtrack
"Where the Streets Have No Name"	2022	Tori Kelly, Scarlett Johansson, Reese Witherspoon, Nick Kroll	Sing 2: Original Motion Picture Soundtrack
"There's Nothing Holdin' Me Back"	2022	Tori Kelly	Sing 2: Original Motion Picture Soundtrack
"A Sky Full of Stars"	2022	None	Sing 2: Original Motion Picture Soundtrack
"Christmas (Baby Please Come Home)"	2022	Keke Palmer, Tori Kelly, Reese Witherspoon, Scarlett Johansson	Sing 2: Original Motion Picture Soundtrack

== Accolades ==
Egerton won a Golden Globe Award for his role in Rocketman. He has also garnered a Grammy Award nomination for his work on its soundtrack. He has been nominated by the British Academy of Film and Television Arts for the BAFTA Rising Star Award and the BAFTA Award for Best Actor in a Leading Role.
