= Sing (franchise) =

Illumination media franchise

- Created by: Garth Jennings
- Original work: Sing (2016)
- Owners: Universal Pictures (via Illumination)
- Years: 2016–present

Films and television
- Films: Sing (2016); Sing 2 (2021); Sing 3 (TBA)
- Short films: Gunter Babysits (2017); Love at First Sight (2017); Eddie's Life Coach (2017); Come Home (2021); For Gunter's Eyes Only (2022); Animal Attraction (2022); Sing: Thriller (2024)

Audio
- Soundtracks: Sing: Original Motion Picture Soundtrack; Sing 2: Original Motion Picture Soundtrack

Miscellaneous
- Theme park attraction: Sing on Tour (2019–present)

Sing is an American media franchise created by Garth Jennings and produced by Illumination, centered on a series of animated feature films. It features the voice talents of Matthew McConaughey, Reese Witherspoon, Scarlett Johansson, Nick Kroll, Taron Egerton and Tori Kelly among others. The first film, Sing, was released on December 21, 2016, and received mostly positive reviews from critics. The second film, Sing 2, was released on December 22, 2021. The series has grossed $1 billion worldwide.

Set in a world inhabited by anthropomorphic animals, the franchise follows a koala named Buster Moon who, with the help of other citizens, puts on live theater shows that largely encompass singing.

== Films ==
Film	Release date	Director	Screenwriter	Producer(s)
Sing	December 21, 2016	Garth Jennings	Garth Jennings	Chris Meledandri & Janet Healy
Sing 2	December 22, 2021	Garth Jennings	Garth Jennings	Chris Meledandri & Janet Healy

=== Sing (2016) ===
In an attempt to save his theater, a koala named Buster Moon decides to hold a singing competition to get it out of debt.

=== Sing 2 (2021) ===
Buster Moon and his gang now have their sights set on debuting a new show at the Crystal Tower Theater in Redshore City. But without connections, he and his singers must convince media mogul Jimmy Crystal and pitch the idea of casting the rock star Clay Calloway in their show. Buster must embark on a quest to find Clay and persuade him to return to the stage.

=== Sing 3 (TBA) ===
In April 2023, it was announced that a third film was in development. In June 2026, Illumination CEO Chris Meledandri confirmed that Sing 3 is still in development.

== Short films ==
=== Gunter Babysits (2017) ===
Included as a mini-movie on Sing's home media release, the short focuses around Gunter who offers to watch over Rosita and Norman's piglets while they are away, but quickly finds himself way in over his head.

=== Love at First Sight (2017) ===
Included as a mini-movie on Sing's home media release, the short focuses around Miss Crawly who is set up on an online dating website by Johnny in which she attempts to find love.

=== Eddie's Life Coach (2017) ===
Included as a mini-movie on Sing's home media release, the short focuses around Eddie Noodleman, who partakes in a digital life-training seminar on behalf of his mother or else he will be kicked out.

=== Come Home (2021) ===
Come Home is a short film created in association with Comcast and Xfinity (both subsidiaries of Universal) and released as a promo for Sing 2 leading up to its release. It follows a dog mother named Angie, voiced by Keke Palmer, who is struggling to make it home to her family for Christmas. A cover of Christmas (Baby Please Come Home) sung by Keke Palmer, Taron Egerton, Scarlett Johansson, Reese Witherspoon, and Tori Kelly was included in Sing 2's Soundtrack.

=== For Gunter's Eyes Only (2022) ===
Included as a mini-movie on Sing 2's home media release, the short focuses around Johnny and Gunter who attend a hypnotist show in Redshore City where Gunter is hypnotized and believes he is a secret agent.

=== Animal Attraction (2022) ===
Included as a mini-movie on Sing 2's home media release, the short focuses around Darius who is filming a commercial while awaiting confirmation on a role he auditioned for, but is consistently getting things wrong.

=== Sing: Thriller (2024) ===
Sing: Thriller is a short film that was released on Netflix on October 16, 2024. Inspired by the music video for Michael Jackson's "Thriller", the short focuses on Buster Moon and his crew as they are invited by Clay Calloway for a Halloween party, where they soon discover a mysterious ooze has transformed Clay and his guests into dancing zombies.

== Theme park attraction ==
Sing on Tour is an immersive musical stage show attraction at Universal Studios Japan and Universal Studios Beijing. The attraction stars performers in mascot costumes of all of the major characters of the first film, and features the voice talents of the film's Japanese and Chinese audio dubs.

Construction on the Japan iteration of the attraction, in the new "Illumination Theater," began in September 2018, replacing Universal Studios Japan's long-defunct Monster Make-Up show. The attraction was announced mid-construction on December 5, 2018, and then opened on April 18, 2019. The Beijing iteration was confirmed on October 20, 2020, and opened in the park's Minion Land on September 20, 2021.

== Voice cast and crew ==
=== Voice cast ===
List indicators

This section includes characters who will appear or have appeared in more than two films in the series.

- An empty grey cell indicates the character was not in the film, or that the character's official presence has not yet been confirmed.
- ^{U} indicates an uncredited appearance.
- ^{Y} indicates a younger version of the character.

Character	Films		Short films						
Character	Sing	Sing 2	Gunter Babysits	Love at First Sight	Eddie's Life Coach	Come Home	For Gunter's Eyes Only	Animal Attraction	Sing: Thriller
Buster Moon	Matthew McConaughey	Matthew McConaughey				Matthew McConaughey			Matthew McConaughey
Rosita	Reese Witherspoon	Reese Witherspoon	Reese Witherspoon			Reese Witherspoon			
Ash	Scarlett Johansson	Scarlett Johansson				Silent role			Scarlett Johansson
Johnny	Taron Egerton	Taron Egerton		Taron Egerton		Taron Egerton	Taron Egerton		Taron Egerton
Meena	Tori Kelly	Tori Kelly				Tori Kelly^{S}			Tori Kelly
Gunter	Nick Kroll	Nick Kroll	Nick Kroll			Silent role	Nick Kroll		Nick Kroll
Miss Crawly	Garth Jennings	Garth Jennings		Garth Jennings		Silent role	Garth Jennings		Garth Jennings
Nana Noodleman	Jennifer Saunders	Jennifer Saunders			Photograph				Silent role
Nana Noodleman	Jennifer Hudson^{Y}	Jennifer Saunders			Photograph				Silent role
Norman	Nick Offerman	Nick Offerman	Nick Offerman					Silent cameo	
Big Daddy	Peter Serafinowicz	Peter Serafinowicz							
Piglets	Oscar Jennings	Oscar Jennings	Oscar Jennings						
Piglets	Leo Jennings	Leo Jennings	Leo Jennings						
Piglets	Caspar Jennings	Caspar Jennings	Caspar Jennings						
Piglets	Asa Jennings	Asa Jennings	Asa Jennings						
Piglets	Asa Jennings	Ayden Soria	Asa Jennings						
Piglets	Asa Jennings	Julianna Gamiz	Asa Jennings						
Piglets	Asa Jennings	Asher Blinkoff	Asa Jennings						
Piglets	Asa Jennings	Remy Edgerly	Asa Jennings						
Piglets	Asa Jennings	Jack Stanton	Asa Jennings						
Piglets	Asa Jennings	Adeline Krupinski	Asa Jennings						
Piglets	Asa Jennings	Vida Alves McConaughey	Asa Jennings						
Mike	Seth MacFarlane			Photograph					Silent role
Eddie Noodleman	John C. Reilly	Photograph			John C. Reilly				Silent role
Lance	Beck Bennett								
Nancy	Tara Strong			Photograph					Silent role
Becky	Tara Strong								
Russian Bears	James J. Cummings								
Meena's mother	Leslie Jones								
Meena's grandfather	Jay Pharoah			Photograph					
Pete	Jess Harnell								
Judith	Rhea Perlman								
Bob	Bill Farmer	Silent cameo		Silent cameo			Silent cameo		
Eddie's mother	Laraine Newman	Photograph			Laraine Newman				
Baboon	Brad Morris			Photograph					
Jimmy Crystal		Bobby Cannavale							
Porsha Crystal		Halsey				Photograph			Silent role
Nooshy		Letitia Wright				Silent role			Silent role
Clay Calloway		Bono							Silent role
Klaus Kickenklober		Adam Buxton							Silent role
Darius		Eric André				Eric André	Silent cameo	Eric André	Silent role
Suki Lane		Chelsea Peretti							Silent role
Jerry		Spike Jonze^{U}							
Alfonso		Pharrell Williams				Photograph			
Linda Le Bon		Julia Davis							
Herman				Robert Morse					
Garry Wishman					Brad Morris				
Angie						Keke Palmer			
Harry The Hypnotist							Kevin Michael Richardson		
Benny								Garth Jennings	
Marcy								Gwendoline Yeo	

=== Crew ===
Role	Main films	
Role	Sing	Sing 2
Role	2016	2021
Director(s)	Garth Jennings Co-director: Christophe Lourdelet	Garth Jennings Co-director: Christophe Lourdelet
Producer(s)	Chris Meledandri; Janet Healy	Chris Meledandri; Janet Healy
Written by	Garth Jennings	Garth Jennings
Music by	Joby Talbot	Joby Talbot
Edited by	Gregory Perler	Gregory Perler
Production company	Illumination	Illumination
Distributed by	Universal Pictures	Universal Pictures

== Reception ==
=== Box office performance ===
Box office performance of Sing
Film	Release date	Box Office Gross			All Time Ranking		Budget	Ref.
Film	Release date	Domestic	Foreign	Worldwide	Domestic	Worldwide	Budget	Ref.
Sing	December 21, 2016	$270,578,425	$363,759,959	$634,338,384	TBA	TBA	$75 million	
Sing 2	December 22, 2021	$162,790,990	$245,605,281	$408,396,271	TBA	TBA	$85 million	
Total		$433,369,415	$609,365,240	$1,042,734,655	TBA	TBA	$160 million	–

=== Critical and public response ===
Critical and public response to Sing
Film	Critical		Public	
Film	Rotten Tomatoes	Metacritic	CinemaScore	PostTrak
Sing	71% (187 reviews)	59 (37 reviews)	A	—N/a
Sing 2	72% (137 reviews)	49 (28 reviews)	A+	91%
