= Gregory Perler =

American film editor (born 1962)

- Born: May 1, 1962 (age 64); Paterson, New Jersey, U.S.
- Other name: Greg Perler
- Education: New York University
- Years active: 1991–present
- Notable work: A Goofy Movie; Tarzan; Wallace & Gromit: The Curse of the Were-Rabbit; Despicable Me; Hop; Sing
- Website: www.gregoryperler.com

Gregory Perler, A.C.E. (born May 1, 1962) is an American film editor. He is known for his work on Tarzan (1999), Wallace & Gromit: The Curse of the Were-Rabbit (2005), Enchanted (2007), Despicable Me (2010), Sing (2016), and Minions & Monsters (2026).

== Early life and career ==
Perler was born in Paterson, New Jersey on May 1, 1962. He moved to New York City to attend New York University, and graduated in 1986.

After moving to Los Angeles in the 1990s, Perler began his editing career as an associate editor on the animated musical film Beauty and the Beast for Walt Disney Feature Animation (now Walt Disney Animation Studios); he would go on to serve as an editor for additional Disney animated features, including A Goofy Movie and Tarzan. Perler was then hired by director Kevin Lima to edit 102 Dalmatians, a sequel to the 1996 live-action remake of 101 Dalmatians.

In 2010, Perler (alongside Pamela Ziegenhagen-Shefland) served as an editor on Despicable Me, the debut animated feature film of Illumination Entertainment. Their work as editors on the film earned them a nomination for the American Cinema Editors Award for Best Edited Animated Feature Film, though they lost to Toy Story 3. Perler would be nominated in this category two more times: for Despicable Me 2 in 2013, and Sing 2 in 2021.

== Filmography ==
Year	Title	Position	Company	Note(s)
1991	Beauty and the Beast	Associate editor	Walt Disney Feature Animation	Edited by John Carnochan
1995	A Goofy Movie	Editor	Walt Disney Television Animation	
1999	Tarzan	Editor	Walt Disney Feature Animation	
2000	102 Dalmatians	Editor	Walt Disney Pictures	
2001	Jimmy Neutron: Boy Genius	Editor (with Jon Michael Price)	Nickelodeon Movies	
2002	Return to Never Land	Additional editor	Walt Disney Television Animation	Edited by Anthony F. Rocco
2003	101 Dalmatians II: Patch's London Adventure	Additional editor	Walt Disney Television Animation	Edited by Robert S. Bichard and Ron Price; direct-to-video film
2003	Eloise at the Plaza	Editor	ABC	Television film
2003	Eloise at Christmastime	Editor	ABC	Television film
2005	Wallace & Gromit: The Curse of the Were-Rabbit	Editor (with David McCormick)	DreamWorks Animation; Aardman Animations	
2006	Bambi II	Contributing editor (as Greg Perler)	Disneytoon Studios	Edited by Jeremy Milton and Mark Solomon
2006	Flushed Away	Associate editor	DreamWorks Animation; Aardman Animations	Edited by Erika Dapkewicz (Note: Credited as Eric Dapkewicz; Dapkewicz came out as transgender and changed her name in the 2010s.) and John Venzon
2007	Enchanted	Editor (with Stephen A. Rotter)	Walt Disney Pictures	
2008	The Love Guru	Editor (with Lee Haxall and Billy Weber)	Paramount Pictures; Spyglass Entertainment	
2010	Despicable Me	Editor (with Pamela Ziegenhagen-Shefland)	Illumination Entertainment	Nominated – American Cinema Editors Award for Best Edited Animated Feature Film (with Pamela Ziegenhagen-Shefland)
2011	Hop	Editor (with Peter S. Elliot)	Illumination Entertainment	
2011	Arthur Christmas	Special thanks (as Greg Perler)	Sony Pictures Animation; Aardman Animations	Edited by James Cooper and John Carnochan
2013	Despicable Me 2	Editor	Illumination Entertainment	Nominated – American Cinema Editors Award for Best Edited Animated Feature Film
2015	Shaun the Sheep Movie	Thanks	Aardman Animations	Edited by Sim Evan-Jones
2016	Sing	Editor / voice actor (additional voices)	Illumination Entertainment	
2021	Sing 2	Editor	Illumination	Nominated – American Cinema Editors Award for Best Edited Animated Feature Film
2023	The Super Mario Bros. Movie	Additional editor (as Greg Perler)	Illumination	Edited by Eric Osmond
2023	Migration	Additional editor	Illumination	Edited by Christian Gazal
2024	Despicable Me 4	Additional editor	Illumination	Edited by Tiffany Hillkurtz
2024	Sing: Thriller	Editor	Illumination	Short film
2024	Wallace & Gromit: Vengeance Most Fowl	Special thanks	Aardman Animations	Edited by Dan Hembery
2025	In Your Dreams	Additional editor	Netflix Animation Studios	Edited by T.M. Christopher, Greg Knowles, Nick Kenway, and Ken Schretzmann
2026	Minions & Monsters	Editor	Illumination	
