= The Lorax (film) =

2012 Illumination film

- Theatrical release poster
- Directed by: Chris Renaud
- Screenplay by: Cinco Paul; Ken Daurio
- Based on: The Lorax by Dr. Seuss
- Produced by: Chris Meledandri; Janet Healy
- Starring: Danny DeVito; Ed Helms; Zac Efron; Taylor Swift; Betty White
- Edited by: Ken Schretzmann; Claire Dodgson; Steven Liu
- Music by: John Powell
- Production companies: Universal Pictures; Illumination Entertainment
- Distributed by: Universal Pictures
- Release dates: February 19, 2012 (Universal Studios Hollywood); March 2, 2012 (United States)
- Running time: 86 minutes
- Country: United States
- Language: English
- Budget: $70 million
- Box office: $351 million

The Lorax (also known as Dr. Seuss' The Lorax) is a 2012 American animated musical fantasy comedy film based on the 1971 children's book by Dr. Seuss. Produced by Universal Pictures and Illumination Entertainment, the film was directed by Chris Renaud and written by Cinco Paul and Ken Daurio. It stars the voices of Danny DeVito, Ed Helms, Zac Efron, Taylor Swift, and Betty White. The film builds on the book by expanding the story of the Lorax and Ted, the previously unnamed boy who visits the Once-ler, and provides an extended ending.

The film is the second screen adaptation of the book following the 1972 animated television special. The idea for the film was initiated by Seuss's widow Audrey Geisel, who had an established partnership with producer Chris Meledandri from a collaboration on Horton Hears a Who! (2008). Geisel approached Meledandri with the idea when he launched Illumination. The film was announced in 2009 with the creative team attached, and by 2010, DeVito was cast as the Lorax. John Powell composed the score, and also wrote the film's songs alongside co-writer Paul. The animation was produced in France by Illumination Mac Guff.

The Lorax premiered at Universal Studios Hollywood on February 19, 2012, and was theatrically released in the United States on March 2 by Universal Pictures. The film received mixed reviews from critics, and was a commercial success, grossing $351 million against a budget of $70 million.

== Plot ==
Twelve-year-old Theodore "Ted" Wiggins lives in Thneedville, a walled city where all vegetation is artificial, and the city is a colorful plastic paradise. Ted's love interest Audrey longs to see a real tree, so Ted undertakes to find her one. His grandmother Norma tells him about a reclusive man known as the "Once-ler", who is said to know what happened to the trees. Ted leaves Thneedville and discovers that the land outside of his home town is a barren, contaminated wasteland. He finds the Once-ler, who agrees to tell Ted the story of the trees over multiple visits.

The Once-ler recounts how he many decades ago, as a young inventor, found a lush forest of Truffula trees. After chopping down a Truffula to create a knitted garment known as a Thneed, he was confronted by the Lorax, the self-proclaimed "guardian of the forest", who made him promise not to cut down any more trees.

Ted attempts to leave Thneedville again, but is stopped by the town's mayor, Aloysius O'Hare, who owns a company that sells fresh air and thus is threatened by trees making fresh air for free, so he attempts to intimidate Ted into staying in town, but Ted continues to visit the Once-ler.

The Once-ler tells Ted that he harvested the Truffula tufts in a sustainable manner until his unscrupulous relatives arrived to help him with his business. They convinced him to resume cutting down trees which led to large profits, but also deforestation and pollution. After the last tree was cut down, the Once-ler's business plummeted, his family abandoned him, all the animals (along with Melman, his pet mule) left to find a new home, and the Lorax vanished into the sky, leaving behind a stone platform etched with the word "Unless".

The Once-ler gives Ted the last Truffula seed and urges him to plant it and convince the people of Thneedville to care about the trees. Ted returns home, but is spotted by O'Hare's city-wide surveillance system. Enlisting the help of Audrey and his family, Ted takes the seed to the center of town, but O'Hare rallies the citizens against Ted, saying trees are dangerous and filthy. Ted uses a bulldozer to knock down a section of the city wall, revealing the environmental desolation outside. Inspired by Ted's conviction, the crowd turns on O'Hare as his bodyguards Morty and McGuirk launch him away on a jet helmet, while the seed is finally planted.

As time passes, the land begins to recover while wildlife begins to return to the area. The Lorax returns and reunites with the Once-ler, and the two greet each other as friends. The film ends with a message; "UNLESS someone like you cares a whole awful lot, nothing is going to get better. It's not. - Dr. Seuss".

== Voice cast ==
- Danny DeVito as the Lorax, a mystical orange furry humanoid creature with a bushy yellow moustache, who is both the guardian of the truffula forest and acts as a voice of reason. DeVito additionally provided the voice of the Lorax in the Italian, Latin Spanish and Castilian Spanish, German, and Russian dubs of the film. He also provides the opening narration.
- Ed Helms as the Once-ler, a reclusive old man and former inventor
- Zac Efron as Theodore "Ted" Wiggins, an idealistic 12-year-old boy. He is named after the author of the book, Dr. Seuss (Theodor Geisel).
- Taylor Swift as Audrey, Ted's love interest. She is named after Audrey Geisel, Dr. Seuss' wife.
- Rob Riggle as Aloysius O'Hare, the diminutive and greedy mayor of Thneedville and head of the O'Hare Air company that supplies fresh air to Thneedville residents
- Jenny Slate as Mrs. Wiggins, Ted's neurotic mother and Grammy Norma's daughter
- Betty White as Grammy Norma Wiggins, Ted's wise-cracking grandmother and Mrs. Wiggins's mother
- Nasim Pedrad as Isabella, the Once-ler's unscrupulous mother
- Joel Swetow as the 1st Marketing Guy
- Michael Beattie as the 2nd Marketing Guy
- Dave B. Mitchell as the 1st Commercial Guy
- Dempsey Pappion as the 2nd Commercial Guy
- Elmarie Wendel as Aunt Grizelda, the Once-ler's unscrupulous aunt. This was Wendel's final film role before her death on July 21, 2018.
- Danny Cooksey as Brett and Chet, the Once-ler's dim-witted but unscrupulous older twin brothers
- Stephen Tobolowsky as Uncle Ubb, the Once-ler's unscrupulous uncle
- Chris Renaud as the assorted forest animals

== Production ==
The Lorax is the fourth feature film based on a book by Dr. Seuss, the second fully computer-animated adaptation (the first one being Horton Hears a Who! in 2008), and the first to be released in 3D. The film is the second screen adaptation of Dr. Seuss' 1971 children's book The Lorax following the 1972 animated television special. The Lorax was also Illumination Entertainment's first film presented in IMAX 3D (known as "IMAX Tree-D" in publicity for the film). The idea for the film was initiated by Audrey Geisel, Dr. Seuss's widow, who had an established partnership with producer Chris Meledandri from a collaboration on Horton Hears a Who!. Geisel approached Meledandri when he launched Illumination, saying "This is the one I want to do next". The film was officially announced in July 2009, with Meledandri attached as the producer and Geisel as the executive producer. Chris Renaud and Kyle Balda were announced as the director and co-director of the film, while Cinco Paul and Ken Daurio, the duo who wrote the script for Horton Hears a Who! and Illumination's previous films, were set to write the screenplay. In 2010, Danny DeVito was cast as the voice of the Lorax.

The film was fully produced at the French studio Illumination Mac Guff, which was the animation department of Mac Guff, acquired by Illumination Entertainment in the summer of 2011. DeVito reprised his role in five different languages, including the original English audio, and also for the Russian, German, Italian, Catalan/Valencian, Castilian Spanish and Latin Spanish dub editions, learning his lines phonetically. Universal added an environmental message to the film's website after a fourth-grade class in Brookline, Massachusetts, launched a successful petition through Change.org.

== Music ==
The soundtrack for the film was composed by John Powell, who had previously composed the score for Horton Hears a Who! (2008), and the songs were written by Cinco Paul. There were two soundtrack albums released for the film, the first being Powell's film score and the other being the original songs written by Powell and Paul performed by various artists. Original songs written for the film include "Thneedville", "This is the Place", "Everybody Needs a Thneed", "How Bad Can I Be?", and "Let It Grow".

== Release ==
The film was released on March 2, 2012, in the United States and Canada, and later on July 27, in the United Kingdom. It was also the first film to feature the current Universal Pictures logo, with a rearranged version of the fanfare, originally composed by Jerry Goldsmith and composed and arranged by Brian Tyler, as part of the studio's 100th anniversary.

=== Marketing ===
Despite the original Lorax being made as a critique of capitalism and pollution, Mazda used the likeness of The Lorax's setting and characters in an advertisement for their CX-5 SUV. This was seen by some as the complete opposite of the work's original message. In response, Stephanie Sperber, president of Universal partnerships and licensing, said Universal chose to partner with the Mazda CX-5 because it is "a really good choice for consumers to make who may not have the luxury or the money to buy electric or buy hybrid. It's a way to take the better environmental choice to everyone."

The film has also been used to sell Seventh Generation disposable diapers. In total, Illumination Entertainment struck more than 70 different product integration deals for the film, including IHOP, Whole Foods and the United States Environmental Protection Agency.

=== Home media ===
The film was released on DVD, Blu-ray 3D and Blu-ray on August 7, 2012. Three mini-movies were released on the Blu-Ray/DVD Combo Pack: Serenade, Wagon Ho! and Forces of Nature; In Serenade, Lou wants to impress a female Barbaloot, but he has some competition. In Wagon Ho!, two Barbaloots Pipsqueak and Lou take the Once-ler's wagon without asking his permission for a joyride. And in Forces of Nature, the Lorax makes Pipsqueak an "Honorary Lorax" and they team up to try to scare the Once-ler.

=== Video game ===
Blockdot created a mobile puzzle game based on the film, titled Truffula Shuffula. The game was released on February 1, 2012, for iOS and Android platforms.

== Reception ==
=== Box office ===
The film grossed $214.5 million in North America, and $136.9 million in other countries, for a worldwide total of $351.4 million.

The film topped the North American box office with $17.5 million on its opening day (Friday, March 2, 2012). During the weekend, it grossed $70.2 million, easily beating the other new nationwide release, Project X ($21 million), and all other films. This was the biggest opening for an Illumination Entertainment film, and for a feature film adaptation of a book by Dr. Seuss, as well as the second-largest for an environmentalist film. It also scored the third-best debut for a film opening in March, and the eighth-best of all time for an animated film. The Lorax stayed at No. 1 the following weekend, dropping 45% to $38.8 million and beating all new nationwide releases, including Disney's John Carter (second place).

On April 11, 2012, it became the first animated film in over a year to gross more than $200 million in North America, since Walt Disney Animation Studios' Tangled.

=== Critical response ===
On review aggregator Rotten Tomatoes, The Lorax holds an approval rating of 53% based on 155 reviews, with an average rating of 5.9/10. The site's critical consensus reads, "Dr. Seuss' The Lorax is cute and funny enough but the moral simplicity of the book gets lost with the zany Hollywood production values." On Metacritic, the film achieved a score of 46 out of 100 based on reviews from 30 critics, indicating "mixed or average reviews". Audiences polled by CinemaScore gave the film an average grade of "A" on an A+ to F scale.

New York magazine film critic David Edelstein on NPR's All Things Considered strongly objected to the film, arguing that the Hollywood animation and writing formulas washed out the spirit of the book. He wrote that this kind of animated feature was wrong for the source material. Demonstrating how the book's text was used in the film in this excerpt from the review, Edelstein discusses Audrey describing the truffula trees to Ted:

The touch of their tufts was much softer than silk and they had the sweet smell of fresh butterfly milk – and [in the movie] Ted says, "Wow, what does that even mean?" and Audrey says, "I know, right?" So one of the only lines that is from the book, that does have Dr. Seuss' sublime whimsy, is basically made fun of, or at least, dragged down to Earth.

The film also garnered some positive reviews from critics such as Richard Roeper, who called it a "solid piece of family entertainment". Roger Moore of the Pittsburgh Tribune called the film "a feast of bright, Seuss colors, and wonderful Seuss design", and supported its environmentalist message.

=== Accolades ===
The Lorax was nominated for Character Design in an Animated Feature Production and Music in an Animated Feature Production at the 40th Annie Awards in 2013. The film won a award at the Teen Choice Awards for Choice Voice: Movie.

=== Online popularity ===
The film has garnered popularity online as the basis for Internet memes, with notable surges in early 2017 and mid 2023. In particular, the film's version of the Once-ler developed a notable fandom on Tumblr, with many internet users creating remixes of his song “How Bad Can I Be?”, fan art, fan fiction, cosplay, and even alternative versions of the character to ship with each other. This fandom led to the character being labeled as the first instance of a "Tumblr sexyman", a term for fictional characters with massive popularity as sex symbols on Tumblr. In 2023, scenes from the film, such as the Lorax's departure, gained popularity on TikTok.

== See also ==
- List of films based on Dr. Seuss books
