= Sing: Thriller =

2024 American short film

- Directed by: Garth Jennings
- Written by: Garth Jennings
- Based on: Thriller by Michael Jackson
- Produced by: Chris Meledandri
- Starring: Matthew McConaughey; Tori Kelly; Nick Kroll; Scarlett Johansson; Taron Egerton
- Edited by: Gregory Perler
- Music by: Joby Talbot
- Production companies: Universal Pictures; Illumination
- Distributed by: Netflix
- Release date: October 16, 2024
- Running time: 11 minutes
- Country: United States
- Language: English

Sing: Thriller is a 2024 American animated musical comedy horror short film based on the characters from the Sing franchise by Garth Jennings, who also wrote and directed the short film. Produced by Illumination and Universal Pictures, the short is loosely inspired on Michael Jackson's music video "Thriller" and features most of the cast, consisting of Matthew McConaughey, Tori Kelly, Nick Kroll, Scarlett Johansson, and Taron Egerton, reprising their roles from the films.

The short premiered on Netflix on October 16, 2024.

== Plot ==
The short opens up with Thriller being performed in a Halloween-themed musical called GMO the Musical at the New Moon Theater with Meena cast as the main lead of a teenage girl late for a party, Gunter as one of the vegetable creatures singing with the children in costume, and Ash and Johnny as the two mad scientists turning Meena into a lemon.

After the performance, Buster and his friends are invited to Clay Calloway's Halloween Party tonight at his house. Unbeknownst to them, a news report shows a lab being destroyed in an explosion caused by a strange pink and cyan substance. When they arrive at the party, the substance quickly spreads and turns Clay, most of Buster's friends and the guests into zombies, continuing to dance and sing the song from the musical. Buster and Miss Crawly escape to the lake, only to be attacked by a tentacle creature. Before so, Buster suddenly wakes up back at the New Moon Theater, revealing that it was all a dream that he had after he was knocked out by costume heads that fell off a broken shelf, woken by Crawly who informs Buster that the troupe are waiting for him at Johnny's Dad's truck. In relief, Buster and Crawly start to leave for the Halloween Party, but when Crawly turns the lights off after Buster asked her to fix the shelves when they get back, her eyes glow in the same trance as the dancers from Buster's dream. The short then ends with Ray the Snail, also in trance in a small vampire costume, mimicking the laugh from the music video before falling off a Jack-O-Lantern costume head.

== Voice cast ==
- Matthew McConaughey as Buster Moon, a koala who owns the New Moon theater
- Tori Kelly as Meena, a teenage elephant with an exquisite singing voice
- Nick Kroll as Gunter, a passionate dancing pig
- Scarlett Johansson as Ash, a porcupine punk rock guitarist
- Taron Egerton as Johnny, a teenage gorilla who left his father's now-reformed criminal gang to become a singer and pianist
- Garth Jennings as Miss Crawly, Buster's elderly iguana assistant with a glass eye

Additional miscellaneous voices by Erinn Hayes, Katherine Kelloway, Joy Poirel, and Fisher Stevens.

Other characters from the first film, such as Nana Noodleman, Eddie, Mike, Nancy, as well as from the 2021 sequel, Porsha Crystal, Nooshy, Clay Calloway, Darius, Klaus Kickenklober, and Suki Lane, have all made silent cameo appearances throughout the short.

== Production ==
The short film was shadow-dropped in October 2024, and is also the first Illumination short film to be released on Netflix, while being the first holiday special from Netflix not to be produced from DreamWorks Animation. Though unlike the DreamWorks holiday specials released on Netflix, that are produced outsourced by other animation services, the short was produced in-house like most of Illumination’s films through their unit Illumination Studios Paris, with the same assets, characters, and designs used in the first two Sing films.

== Music ==
"Thriller"

Single by Tori Kelly, Nick Kroll, Scarlett Johansson, and Taron Egerton
- Released: 24 October 2024
- Length: 4:36
- Label: Back Lot Music
- Composer: Rod Temperton
- Lyricist: Rod Temperton
- Producer: Harvey Mason Jr.

A single cover for the short, performed by some of the cast, was released one week later on October 24, 2024 by Back Lot Music, containing the same music and lyrics from the song by Rod Temperton. Two other songs include Toccata and Fugue in D Minor by Johann Sebastian Bach, played from the opening of the short, and an original song called Spooky Party by Garth Jennings, which played during when Buster's troupe arrived at Clay's party. Aside from these songs, Joby Talbot returns from the first two films to composed the short film's score.

== Reception ==
Common Sense Media gave the special a 4 out of 5 as a lighthearted tribute to Michael Jackson's song.
