= Sing 2 =

2021 American film

- Theatrical release poster
- Directed by: Garth Jennings
- Written by: Garth Jennings
- Produced by: Chris Meledandri; Janet Healy
- Starring: Matthew McConaughey; Reese Witherspoon; Scarlett Johansson; Taron Egerton; Tori Kelly; Nick Kroll; Bobby Cannavale; Halsey; Pharrell Williams; Nick Offerman; Letitia Wright; Eric André; Chelsea Peretti; Bono
- Edited by: Gregory Perler
- Music by: Joby Talbot
- Production companies: Universal Pictures; Illumination
- Distributed by: Universal Pictures
- Release dates: November 14, 2021 (AFI Fest); December 22, 2021 (United States)
- Running time: 110 minutes
- Country: United States
- Language: English
- Budget: $85 million
- Box office: $408.4 million

Sing 2 is a 2021 American animated musical comedy film written and directed by Garth Jennings. Produced by Universal Pictures and Illumination, it is the sequel to Sing (2016) and the second film in the franchise. The film stars the voices of Matthew McConaughey, Reese Witherspoon, Scarlett Johansson, Taron Egerton, Tori Kelly, Nick Kroll, and Nick Offerman reprising their roles from the first film, with Bobby Cannavale, Halsey, Pharrell Williams, Letitia Wright, Eric André, Chelsea Peretti, and Bono joining the cast. The story is set after the events of the first film with Buster Moon and his group putting on a show in Redshore City while working to impress an entertainment mogul (Cannavale) and enlist a reclusive rock star (Bono) to perform with the group. Like its predecessor, the film features songs from many artists, most of which are performed diegetically.

Sing 2 had its world premiere at the AFI Fest on November 14, 2021, and was theatrically released in the United States on December 22 by Universal. The film received mostly positive reviews from critics and grossed $408 million against a budget of $85 million, becoming the highest-grossing animated film of 2021 and the tenth-highest-grossing film of 2021. A sequel is in development.

== Plot ==
After the events of the first film, Buster Moon is thriving with his newly rebuilt theater. Johnny, Rosita, Gunter, Meena, and Miss Crawly work as his cast and crew, while Ash performs as a soloist at a rock club. Buster's show fails to impress Crystal Entertainment's talent scout Suki Lane from Redshore City. Encouraged by Nana Noodleman, Buster gathers his crew, and they travel to the city to make an impression.

After being denied entry into Crystal Entertainment, they sneak in for an audition with entertainment mogul Jimmy Crystal. As Jimmy is uninterested in Buster's original pitch, Gunter suggests a space-themed sci-fi musical that features songs from Clay Calloway, a legendary rock star who disappeared after his wife Ruby died 15 years ago. Intrigued, and assuming that Clay will be part of the show, Jimmy greenlights it and lets Buster and his friends stay at his hotel during production.

Miss Crawly finds where Clay lives and goes to visit him, but he scares her away with a paintball gun. During rehearsal, Rosita reveals to have a fear of heights after learning she needs to make a high jump, prompting Jimmy to insist Buster have his daughter Porsha play her part instead. Buster reluctantly writes Rosita a minor role. Top choreographer Klaus Kickenklober is hired to teach Johnny to dance, but is unnecessarily harsh, causing Johnny to fall behind. Johnny later comes across street dancer Nooshy, who takes over as his teacher. Meena is cast in a romantic scene with a well-intentioned but heavily egocentric actor named Darius, but is unable to act the part convincingly, having never been in love before. She later meets and falls in love with an ice cream vendor named Alfonso. Jimmy eventually finds out that Buster never contacted Clay about the show and threatens to fight Buster if he does not deliver.

Ash and Buster visit Clay to convince him to join the show. He refuses at first, finding it too emotionally sad to perform after Ruby's death, but Ash changes his mind. Back at the theater, Buster offers Porsha to switch roles with Rosita, as Porsha's acting skills are poor. Porsha misunderstands this as Buster firing her and leaves. After news of the "firing" is broadcast, Jimmy scolds Porsha, sobbing, and nearly drops Buster off the hotel's roof for making him look bad before locking him in his bathroom. Suki frees Buster and warns him to leave Redshore City before Jimmy sends his bodyguards to find him. Ash arrives at the hotel room with the crew and Clay, who advises Buster not to run and hide as he did. After overhearing Jimmy insulting him and his crew on television, Buster decides to put on the show behind Jimmy's back. Porsha rejoins the show, Johnny calls his father and his gang to keep Jimmy, Jerry, and his bodyguards at bay, and Rosita arranges for her husband Norman and their children to distract hotel security.

During the show, a jealous Klaus takes the place of Johnny's performance partner to undermine his number, but Johnny defeats Klaus with encouragement from Nooshy and the other dancers, finally earning Klaus' respect. Porsha performs a high-energy song and dance number in the minor role originally given to Rosita, standing up to Jimmy. Meena visualizes Darius as Alfonso and successfully performs a romantic duet with him. In a last attempt to stop the show, Jimmy, at his breaking point, drops Buster off from a high catwalk, which causes Rosita to overcome her fear of heights to save Buster from Jimmy. When it's time for Clay to take the stage for the finale, he says he is not ready yet. Ash leads the audience in a rendition of one of Clay's emotional songs, giving him the courage to perform. After the curtain call, impressed by how wrong he was over the show’s performance, Jimmy wants to take the credit for the successful show, but is instead arrested for his crimes and defeated by the police for lying and threatening to kill Buster after Suki angrily arrives on the empty stage.

Just as Buster and his friends begin to leave the next morning with Nooshy, Porsha, and Clay joining them, Suki stops them and tells them a major theater called The Majestic wants to put on their show. As they put on their first official performance, Buster watches from the VIP section, proud to have succeeded in Redshore City.

== Voice cast ==
- Matthew McConaughey as Buster Moon, a koala who owns the New Moon Theater
- Reese Witherspoon as Rosita, a pig and mother of 25 piglets who recently realized her singing dreams
- Scarlett Johansson as Ash, a porcupine punk rock guitarist
- Taron Egerton as Johnny, a teenage gorilla who left his father's ex-criminal gang to become a singer and pianist
- Bobby Cannavale as Jimmy Crystal, a white wolf and media owner who runs Crystal Entertainment
- Tori Kelly as Meena, a slightly shy teenage elephant with an exquisite singing voice
- Nick Kroll as Gunter, a passionate dancing pig and Rosita's dance partner
- Pharrell Williams as Alfonso, an elephant and ice cream vendor who becomes Meena's love interest
- Halsey as Porsha Crystal, Jimmy's daughter who is a talented singer
- Chelsea Peretti as Suki Lane, Jimmy's haughty Saluki assistant and talent scout
- Letitia Wright as Nooshy, a lynx street dancer who becomes Johnny's dance instructor
- Eric André as Darius, an egocentric yak who plays Meena's love interest in the show
- Adam Buxton as Klaus Kickenklober, a harsh and prideful proboscis monkey dance instructor. Buxton previously voiced Stan in the first film.
- Garth Jennings as Miss Crawly, an elderly iguana with a glass eye who works as Buster's assistant
  - Jennings also voices the bus terminal and the airbag from a rental car.
- Peter Serafinowicz as Big Daddy, a mobster gorilla and Johnny's father who is now on work release
- Jennifer Saunders as Nana Noodleman, a sheep and former singing star
- Nick Offerman as Norman, a pig and Rosita's husband
- Bono as Clay Calloway, a white-maned aged lion who was once a rock star legend until his wife Ruby died

In addition, Julia Davis voices Linda Le Bon, a horse and host of Hot News, while Spike Jonze has an uncredited voice role as Jerry, a cat who is Jimmy's personal assistant.

Amongst the voices of Rosita and Norman's piglets is Matthew McConaughey's daughter, Vida Alves, who voices the piglet that goes splashing in chocolate. Director Jennings' wife, Louise, voices a dog worker making Meena's costume for the show, while the couple's four children, Asa, Caspar, Leo and Oscar, are among the piglet voices.

As with the first film, Jennings' filmmaker friends Wes Anderson, Chris Renaud, and Edgar Wright all have cameos in the film, with Anderson as a tarsier night cleaner, Renaud as Linda Le Bon's show announcer, and Wright voicing a dog cop and a pig driver. Scott Mosier, director of Dr. Seuss' The Grinch and the short film Eddie's Life Coach, voices Mason, a walrus worker making the sets for the show.

== Production ==
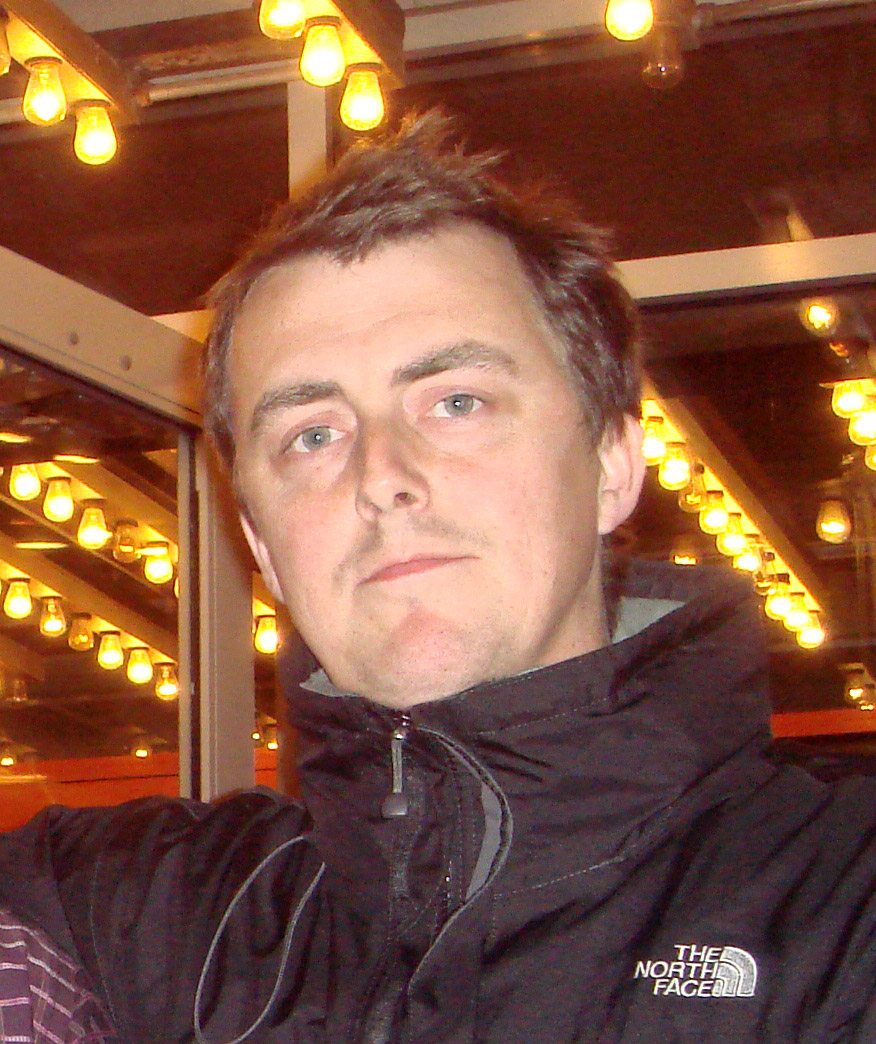
Writer and director Garth Jennings

=== Development ===
On January 25, 2017, Universal Pictures and Illumination announced that a sequel to their 2016 animated film Sing was in development. Writer/director Garth Jennings and producers Chris Meledandri and Janet Healy return along with voiceover stars Matthew McConaughey, Reese Witherspoon, Scarlett Johansson, Nick Kroll, Taron Egerton and Tori Kelly. The sequel took 4 years to make before the start of the COVID-19 pandemic.

=== Casting ===
In December 2020, Bobby Cannavale, Letitia Wright, Eric André, Chelsea Peretti, longtime Illumination collaborator Pharrell Williams, Bono and Halsey were added to the voice cast.

=== Animation and design ===
Work on the film shifted due to the COVID-19 pandemic, and was done remotely following the temporary closure of Illumination Mac Guff (now renamed as Illumination Studios Paris).

The scope of the theater in the finale was a major stepping stone to take over 10,000 animals for the crowd department, old and new ones designed by long-time Illumination artist Eric Guillon who worked on Sing and designed the new characters in the sequel like choreographer Klaus and the tarsiers. Fashion brand Rodarte designed some of the costumes used in the film.

== Music ==
In December 2020, Joby Talbot returned to compose the score. U2 performed the film's original song "Your Song Saved My Life". The song was released on November 3, 2021. Additional music includes songs by Kiana Ledé, Sam i, Billie Eilish, Elton John and more. The film's soundtrack was released on December 17, 2021.

== Release ==
=== Theatrical and home media ===
Sing 2 had its world premiere, opening the AFI Fest Celebration on November 14, 2021, and was theatrically released in the United States on December 22, 2021, in RealD 3D, due to the COVID-19 pandemic, after previously being scheduled to be released in the United States on December 25, 2020, and July 2, 2021. Early access screenings occurred in the United States on November 27, 2021. The film was released to video on January 7, 2022, on platforms such as Amazon Prime Video, Apple TV, Vudu, Xfinity, and YouTube. It was released on Blu-ray, DVD, and Ultra HD Blu-ray on March 29, 2022, by Universal Pictures Home Entertainment.

=== Marketing ===
Tomy made a deal with Illumination and Universal to develop the Sing 2 toy line, featuring plush toys, collectible figures, and a role-playing game. An Adopt Me! live event was released on Roblox by Uplift Games in partnership with Illumination to promote this film. The film also has many promotional partners including Xfinity, (Note: Exclusively in a Christmas commercial from Comcast.) McDonald's, Kellogg's, and Mercari. By its opening weekend in the United States and Canada, the film had made 393.1 million impressions across all social media platforms, a statistic 24% above those of a film released before the COVID-19 pandemic. Overall, the film had a better social media reach than 2021's Encanto, The Addams Family 2, Tom & Jerry, Spirit Untamed, and The Croods: A New Age.

== Reception ==
=== Box office ===
Sing 2 grossed $162.8 million in the United States and Canada, and $245.6 million in other territories, for a worldwide total of $408.4 million.

In the United States and Canada, the film earned $1.6 million from sneak previews held on November 27, 2021. The film had its wide release the following month on Wednesday, December 22, alongside The King's Man and The Matrix Resurrections, and was projected to gross $40–50 million from 3,892 theaters over its first five days of release. The film ended up grossing $22.3 million in its opening weekend (and a total of $41 million over the five-day frame) from an estimated 4.1 million theater admissions, placing second at the box office behind Spider-Man: No Way Home. Women made up 58% of the audience during its opening, with those below the age of 25 comprising 56% of ticket sales and those below 17 comprising 44%. The ethnic breakdown of the audience showed that 39% were Hispanic and Latino Americans, 35% European Americans, 15% African American, and 7% Asian or other. In its second weekend, the film remained in second place with $20.2 million. Sing 2 once again retained second place at the box office in its third weekend with $11.6 million. On January 8, 2022, Sing 2 became the first animated film of the COVID-19 pandemic to cross $100 million at the U.S. and Canadian box office as well as the first film since Frozen II (2019) to reach this milestone. It remained atop the box office top ten until its fifteenth weekend.

Outside the United States and Canada, Sing 2 opened in several international markets on December 3, 2021. The film made $1.12 million in its first weekend, $1.5 million in its second, and another $1.5 million from 16 markets in its third. After screening in an additional 22 markets, Sing 2 earned $19.2 million in its fourth weekend and had the biggest opening for an animated film during the COVID-19 pandemic in both France ($6 million) and Mexico ($3.6 million). The film made $17.2 million in its fifth weekend, which included a $1.2 million opening in Ukraine, $17.1 million in its sixth weekend, and $8.4 million in its seventh weekend. In its eighth weekend, the film had strong openings in Germany ($3 million), Poland ($2.4 million), and Austria ($500,000). In its ninth weekend, the film earned $17.4 million from 62 markets, which included a $9.3 million opening in the U.K. In its tenth weekend, the film earned $14 million from 63 markets, which included a $1.1 million debut in the country of Denmark where pandemic restrictions had recently been lifted. The film crossed the $300 million mark worldwide in its eleventh weekend after adding $11 million to its total, which included a $2.2 million debut in the Netherlands. The film's gross remained consistent in its twelfth weekend with $10.3 million that included a 1% drop in the U.K. Sing 2 crossed the $200 million mark outside the U.S. and Canada in its thirteenth weekend. By March 6, the film had surpassed the original film's gross in the U.K. with $40.5 million. In its fifteenth weekend, the film added $3 million to its total gross and the Sing franchise as a whole passed the $1 billion mark. The film made $6.1 million in its sixteenth weekend, which included a $4.3 million opening in Japan. It added $3.6 million in its seventeenth weekend. The film crossed the $400 million mark worldwide with the addition of $1.9 million in its nineteenth weekend. It is the first film since Frozen II, the first animated film during the pandemic, and the ninth Illumination title to reach the milestone. It made $1.2 million the following weekend.

=== Critical response ===
On review aggregator Rotten Tomatoes, the film has an approval rating of 72% based on 137 reviews, and an average rating of 6.1/10. The site's critical consensus reads, "Second verse, same as the first: For audiences that enjoyed the first installment, Sing 2 should prove another endearing diversion." On Metacritic, the film has a weighted average score of 49 out of 100 based on 28 critics, indicating "mixed or average reviews". Audiences polled by CinemaScore gave the film a rare average grade of "A+" on an A+ to F scale (the first Illumination film to receive this grade), while PostTrak reported 91% of audience members gave it a positive score, with 78% saying they would definitely recommend it.

Justin Lowe, writing for The Hollywood Reporter, praised the musical set of the film, calling the "ragtag cast that Buster had brought for an amateur cast, had blossomed into a full-fledged company of professional performers". Peter Debruge, of Variety, also gave a positive review, saying the film is "an elaborate machinery of joy, and it's easier to appreciate how every choice seems designed to put a smile on people's faces".

However, a few reviewers were disappointed by the film. Emily Clark of Plugged In praised the film's inspiring and emotional elements, but took issue with the fact that Meena "clearly tells Buster she's not OK kissing someone on stage, and he sort of dismisses her...The whole affair made me a bit queasy thinking about how many a young starlet has received her first smooch from a total stranger at the behest of adult directors and producers." Mark Kermode, who had given the first film a positive review, stated that Sing 2 overused its flashier technical effects and lacked the "homemade charm" that characterized the first film.

== Accolades ==
Accolades received by Sing 2
Award	Date of ceremony	Category	Recipient(s)	Result	Ref.
Hollywood Music in Media Awards	November 17, 2021	Best Music Supervisor(s) – Film	Mike Knobloch; Rachel Levy	Nominated	
Hollywood Music in Media Awards	November 17, 2021	Best Original Song – Animated Film	Your Song Saved My Life – U2 (Bono, Adam Clayton, Larry Mullen Jr. and David Evans)	Nominated	
Hollywood Music in Media Awards	November 17, 2021	Best Soundtrack Album	Sing 2 – Original Motion Picture Soundtrack	Nominated	
NAACP Image Awards	February 26, 2022	Outstanding Animated Motion Picture	Sing 2	Nominated	
NAACP Image Awards	February 26, 2022	Outstanding Character Voice-Over Performance – Motion Picture	Letitia Wright	Won	
NAACP Image Awards	February 26, 2022	Outstanding Character Voice-Over Performance – Motion Picture	Eric André	Nominated	
ACE Eddie Awards	March 5, 2022	Best Edited Animated Feature Film	Gregory Perler	Nominated	
Art Directors Guild Awards	March 5, 2022	Excellence in Production Design for an Animated Film	Olivier Adam	Nominated	
Visual Effects Society Awards	March 8, 2022	Outstanding Visual Effects in an Animated Feature	Patrick Delage, Nathalie Vancauwenberghe, Christophe Lourdelet, Boris Jacq	Nominated	
Visual Effects Society Awards	March 8, 2022	Outstanding Created Environment in an Animated Feature	Ludovic Ramière, Théo Rivoalen, Henri Deruer, Frédéric Mainil (for Crystal Theater)	Nominated	
Visual Effects Society Awards	March 8, 2022	Outstanding Effects Simulations in an Animated Feature	Richard Adenot, Guillaume Gay, Frédéric Valz-Gris, Antoine Brémont	Nominated	
Annie Awards	March 12, 2022	Best Animated Feature	Sing 2	Nominated	
Producers Guild of America Awards	March 19, 2022	Outstanding Producer of Animated Theatrical Motion Pictures	Chris Meledandri and Janet Healy	Nominated	
American Cinema Editors Awards	March 5, 2022	Best Edited Animated Feature Film	Gregory Perler	Nominated	
Nickelodeon Kids' Choice Awards	April 9, 2022	Favorite Animated Movie	Sing 2	Nominated	
Nickelodeon Kids' Choice Awards	April 9, 2022	Favorite Voice from an Animated Movie	Scarlett Johansson as Ash	Won	
Nickelodeon Kids' Choice Awards	April 9, 2022	Favorite Voice from an Animated Movie	Reese Witherspoon as Rosita	Nominated	

== Sequel ==
In April 2023, Meledandri confirmed a third Sing film is in development, and reiterated its development on June 22, 2026.
