= Sing (2016 American film) =

Illumination film

- Theatrical release poster
- Directed by: Garth Jennings
- Written by: Garth Jennings
- Produced by: Chris Meledandri; Janet Healy
- Starring: Matthew McConaughey; Reese Witherspoon; Seth MacFarlane; Scarlett Johansson; John C. Reilly; Taron Egerton; Tori Kelly
- Cinematography: Guylo Homsy
- Edited by: Gregory Perler
- Music by: Joby Talbot
- Production companies: Universal Pictures; Illumination Entertainment
- Distributed by: Universal Pictures
- Release dates: September 11, 2016 (TIFF); December 21, 2016 (United States)
- Running time: 108 minutes
- Country: United States (Note: Attributed to multiple sources:)
- Language: English
- Budget: $75 million
- Box office: $654.5 million

Sing is a 2016 American animated musical comedy film written and directed by Garth Jennings. Produced by Universal Pictures and Illumination Entertainment, the film stars the voices of Matthew McConaughey, Reese Witherspoon, Seth MacFarlane, Scarlett Johansson, Leslie Jones, John C. Reilly, Taron Egerton, and Tori Kelly. Set in a world inhabited by anthropomorphic animals, the film focuses on a koala named Buster Moon (McConaughey), a struggling theater owner who stages a singing competition in an effort to stop his theater from entering foreclosure, as well as how the competition interferes with the personal lives of its contestants.

The film features more than 60 songs from famous artists, mostly performed diegetically. It also has an original song by Stevie Wonder and Ariana Grande called "Faith", which was nominated for a Golden Globe. Aside from these songs, Joby Talbot (Jennings’ frequent collaborator) composed the film's score.

Sing was screened at the Toronto International Film Festival on September 11, 2016, followed by its premiere at the Microsoft Theater in Los Angeles on December 3. It was then theatrically released in the United States on December 21 by Universal. It received mostly positive reviews from critics and was a box-office success, grossing $654 million worldwide on a $75 million budget. A sequel, Sing 2, was released in 2021.

== Plot ==
In Calatonia, a city of anthropomorphic animals, a koala named Buster Moon owns a struggling theater, and is threatened with foreclosure by bank representative llama, Judith. He decides to hold a singing competition with a prize of $1,000, but a typo made by his elderly iguana assistant, Miss Crawly, adds two extra zeros to the prize money, making it $100,000. The misprinted flyers are blown out of the window by a fan before they can be proofread, and float across the city.

Crowds of animals gather to audition, and Buster selects his contestants. Among them are Rosita, a pig who is a housewife and mother to 25 piglets; Ash, a punk-rock porcupine; Johnny, a teenage gorilla and son of criminal gang leader, Big Daddy; Mike, a street musician mouse; and Gunter, an exuberant dancing pig. Teenage elephant Meena fails her audition due to stage fright, Ash's self-absorbed boyfriend Lance is upset to be dismissed from the contest, and Rosita is paired with Gunter for a dance routine. After Buster discovers the flyers advertise a prize of $100,000, he joins his friend Eddie, a laid-back sheep, on a visit to Eddie's wealthy grandmother, former theater superstar Nana Noodleman. Nana is reluctant to sponsor the prize money but agrees to attend a private preview of the show before making a decision.

Pressured by her grandfather, Meena attempts to request a second audition but settles for being Buster's stagehand instead. After some acts withdraw from the competition, Meena is offered a spot in the show but again struggles to overcome her fear. Rosita flounders in her dance routine with Gunter, believing her motherly duties have caused her to lose her passion. Mike, assuming he will win the competition, takes out a massive loan from the bank to buy a flashy car and swindles a group of Russian bears in a card game. Lance cheats on Ash, causing her to break up with him and later to break down crying during a rehearsal. Johnny, forced by his father to partake in a heist as a getaway driver, sneaks away to the rehearsal. Traffic from a car accident that Johnny unknowingly caused prevents him from returning to the heist in time, resulting in his father and his gang getting arrested and imprisoned, straining their relationship. After an accident causes stage lights to fall and break, Buster, Miss Crawly, Meena, and Kevin rebuild the stage as a tank with luminescent squids as lights.

Desperate, Johnny attempts to steal the prize money for his father's bail, but when he sees a note on Buster's desk praising his talents, Johnny resolves to focus on his musical career instead. Meanwhile, Rosita regains her passion for dancing while grocery shopping, and Ash composes a song that Buster likes. On the day of the preview for Nana, the bears Mike had cheated locate him and demand their money back. Mike directs them to Buster; the bears use a baseball bat to break open the prize chest, but it is nowhere near $100,000. Shocked by the lack of money, the rest of the contestants question Buster, and the squid tank shatters from the impact of the bat and everyone's weight. The flooded theater collapses, and Judith repossesses the lot, while a disheartened Buster takes up residence with Eddie and supports himself by washing cars.

Meena goes to the rubble of the theater and sings out loud to music on her headphones, inspiring Buster to stage an outdoor show. Despite attempts from Judith to halt the show, it takes place on the lot of the former theater with Meena's and Rosita's families in attendance. More animals are drawn into the audience when the show is broadcast live on the local news. Rosita's husband Norman is roused by his wife's talent, Big Daddy breaks out of prison and travels to the lot to reconcile with Johnny, Lance is impressed by Ash's original rock song "Set It All Free", the bears find Mike and pursue him away; and Meena overcomes her stage fright and gives an enthusiastic performance. The show is a success and impresses Nana, who was in the audience. She purchases the lot, and the theater is rebuilt and reopened.

== Voice cast ==
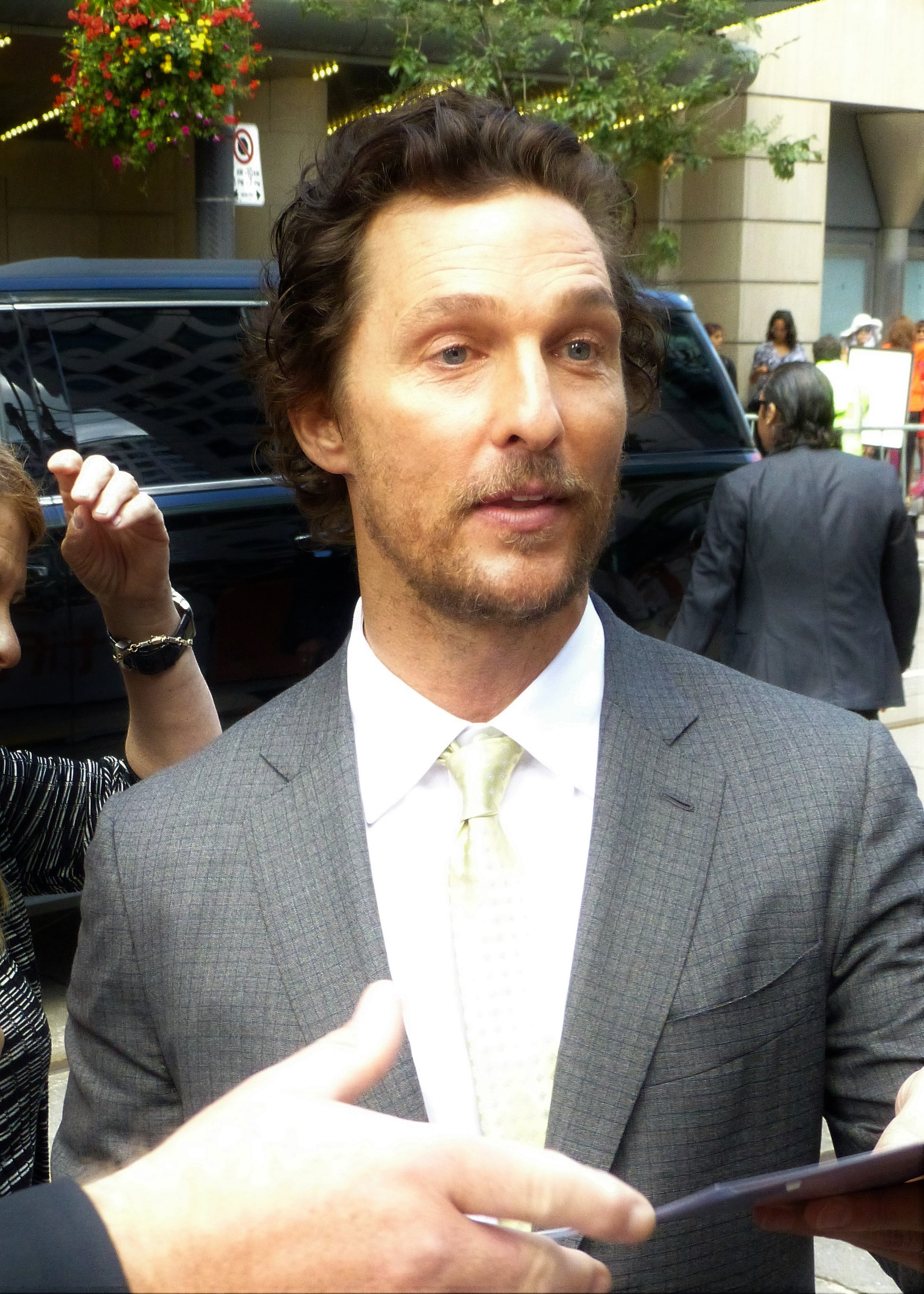
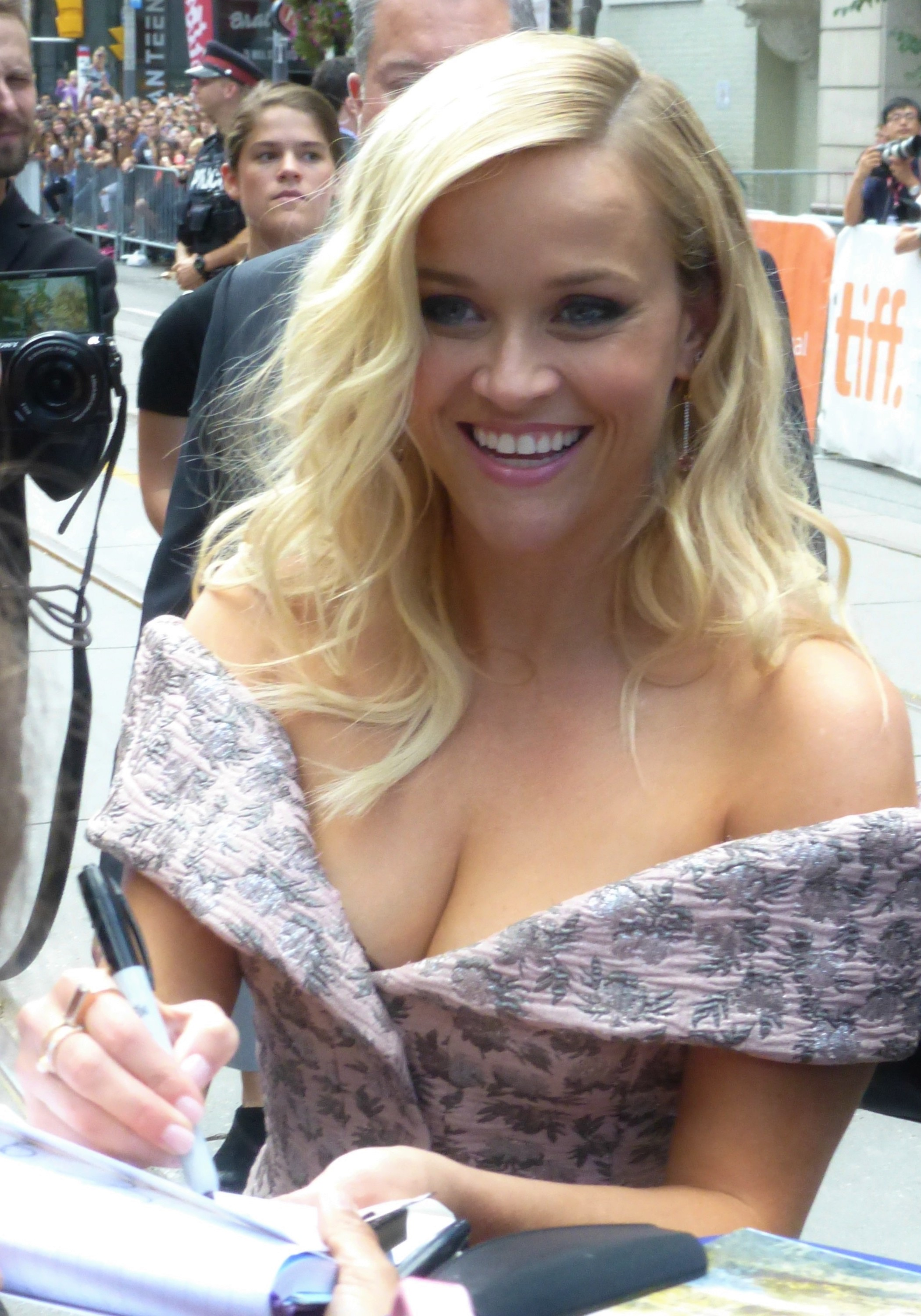
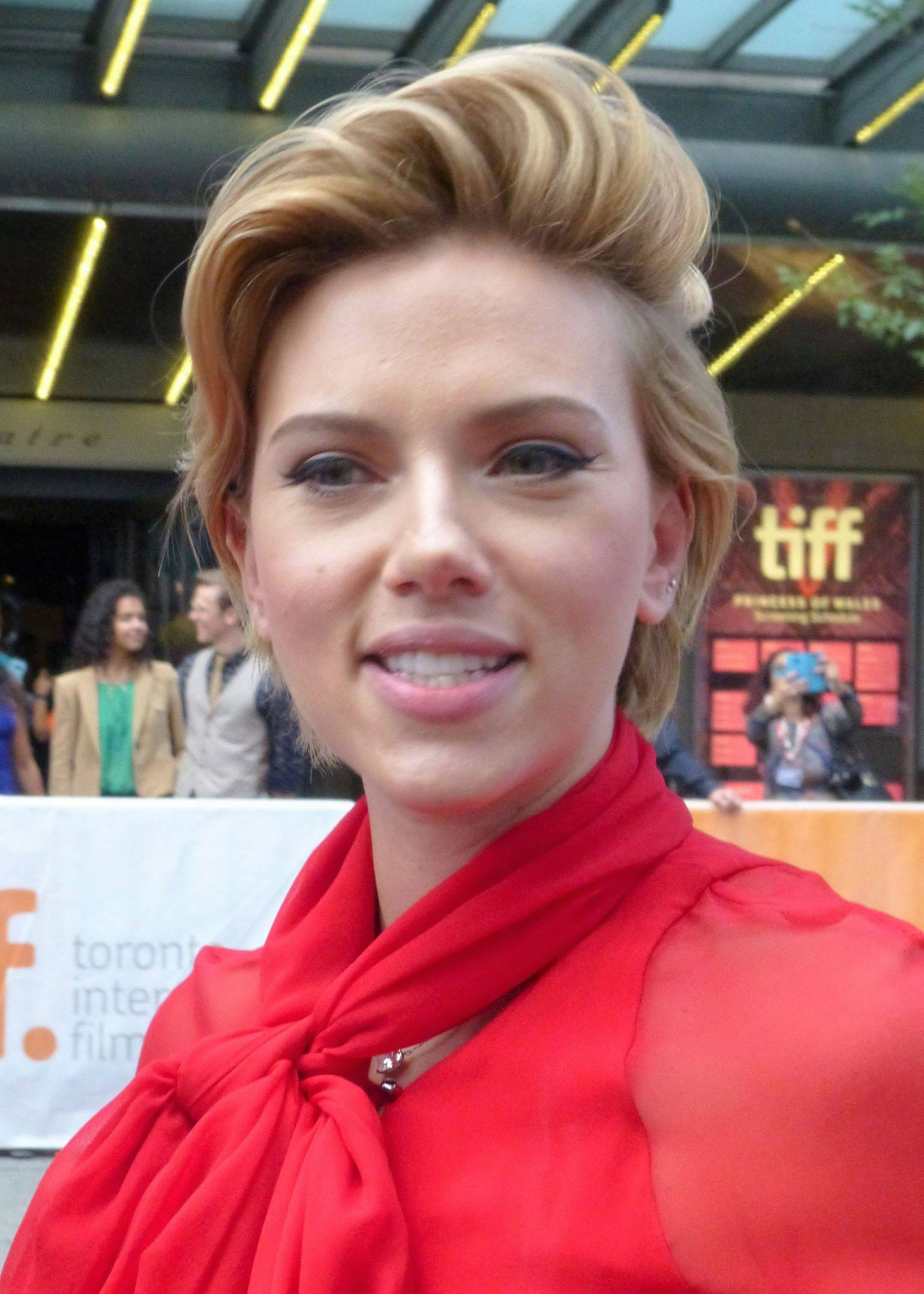
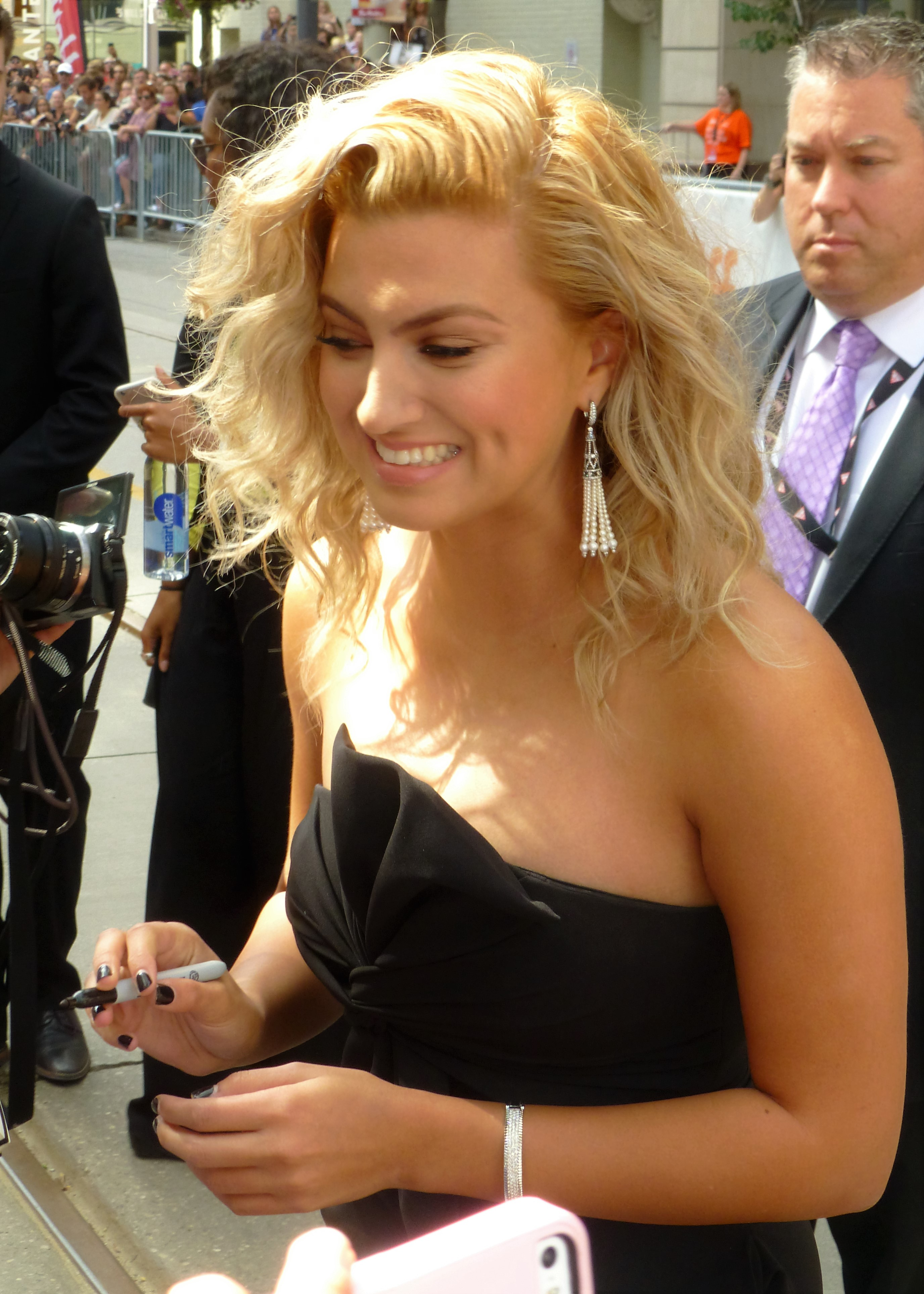
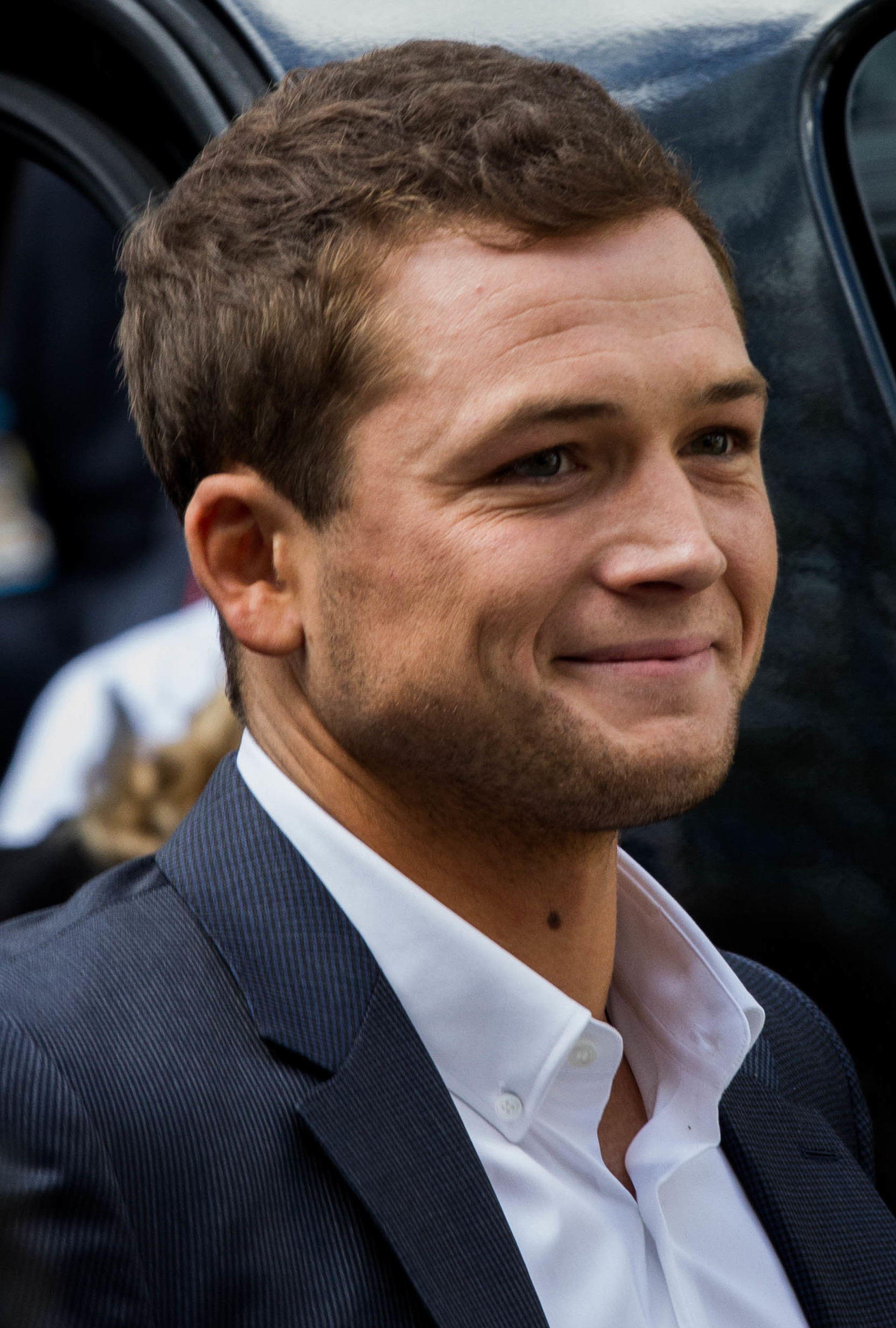
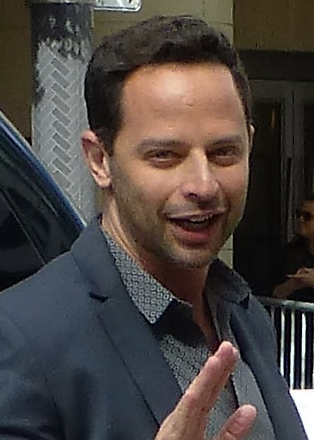
Matthew McConaughey, Reese Witherspoon, Scarlett Johansson, Tori Kelly, Taron Egerton, and Nick Kroll at the film's premiere at the Toronto International Film Festival
- Matthew McConaughey as Buster Moon, an optimistic koala determined to save his theater
- Reese Witherspoon as Rosita, a pig housewife and mother of 25 piglets, who aspired to sing and dance when she was younger
- Seth MacFarlane as Mike, an arrogant white mouse street singer whose singing voice is based on that of Frank Sinatra
- Scarlett Johansson as Ash, a teenage porcupine punk rocker in an alternative-rock music duo with her boyfriend Lance
- John C. Reilly as Eddie Noodleman, a sheep and Buster's friend who doubts the future of the theater
- Taron Egerton as Johnny, a teenage gorilla who wants to be a singer and pianist against his criminal father's wishes
- Tori Kelly as Meena, a teenage elephant with an exquisite voice and severe stage fright
- Jennifer Saunders as Nana Noodleman, Eddie's grandmother who was a famous singer in her glory days
  - Jennifer Hudson as Young Nana (speaking and singing voice)
- Garth Jennings as Miss Crawly, an elderly iguana with a glass eye working as Buster's assistant
- Peter Serafinowicz as Big Daddy, a gorilla gang leader who wants his son Johnny to follow in his crime business
- Nick Kroll as Gunter, a passionate dancing pig who is partnered with Rosita for the show
- Beck Bennett as Lance, a porcupine and Ash's self-absorbed boyfriend
- Jay Pharoah as Meena's grandfather, who pressures her to overcome her stage fright
- Nick Offerman as Norman, an overworked pig and Rosita's husband
- Leslie Jones as Meena's mother
- Rhea Perlman as Judith, a brown llama banker who threatens to repossess the theater
- Laraine Newman as Meena's grandmother
- Adam Buxton as Stan, a gorilla in Big Daddy's gang
- Brad Morris as an unnamed baboon whom Mike attacks for not donating more money to his street performances
- Bill Farmer as Bob, a dog reporter who documents Buster's singing competition.

The voices of Rosita and Norman's piglet children were provided by Oscar, Leo, Caspar, and Asa Jennings, the children of Garth Jennings. Jennings had directors Edgar Wright (as a goat) and Wes Anderson (as Daniel, a giraffe who auditions with the song "Ben") provide "additional voices", continuing a tradition of the three friends appearing in each other's films. An archival recording of Shooby Taylor, who died in 2003, singing "Stout-Hearted Men" was used for the singing voice of a hippopotamus.

== Production ==
=== Development ===
In January 2014, it was announced that Garth Jennings would write and direct an animated comedy film for Universal Pictures and Illumination Entertainment, about "courage, competition and carrying a tune". It was originally titled Lunch, then retitled Sing. The idea for the film came from producer Chris Meledandri who wanted the story to be about a shifty theater owner who tries to save his business by putting up a singing competition, and it took five years from the announcement to its release in 2016. Due to the concept of a musical film with animal singing various covers, The film contains over 65 non-stop pop songs, the rights to which cost 15% of the film's $75 million budget.

=== Casting ===
On January 14, 2015, Matthew McConaughey was cast in the film's lead voice role. Chris Meledandri and Janet Healy produced the film. On June 17, 2015, it was confirmed that McConaughey's character was named Buster and that John C. Reilly would voice Eddie, a sheep and Buster's best friend. In November 2015, it was announced that Reese Witherspoon, Seth MacFarlane, Scarlett Johansson, Tori Kelly and Taron Egerton joined the cast for the film.

=== Animation and design ===
The animation was created entirely in France by Illumination Mac Guff, with character and production design provided by Eric Guillon.

== Release ==
The nearly complete film was screened as a work in progress beginning September 11, 2016 at the Toronto International Film Festival. Universal Studios released the film on December 21, 2016.

=== Home media ===
Sing was released on DVD, Blu-ray, Blu-ray 3D and 4K Ultra HD Blu-ray on March 21, 2017. It includes three short films: Gunter Babysits, Love at First Sight, and Eddie's Life Coach. The film made a revenue of $63 million with 3.3 million units sold, making it the seventh best-selling title of 2017.

== Reception ==
=== Box office ===
Sing grossed $270 million in the United States and Canada, and $384 million in other territories, for a worldwide total of $654 million, against a production budget of $75 million. Deadline Hollywood calculated the net profit of the film to be $194.2 million, accounting for production budgets, marketing, talent participations, and other costs, with box office grosses, and ancillary revenues from home media, placing it seventh on their list of 2016's "Most Valuable Blockbusters".

In North America, the film opened alongside Passengers and Assassin's Creed, and was expected to gross around $70 million from 4,022 theaters over its first six days of release. The film made $1.7 million during its Tuesday night previews. It went on to gross $35.2 million in its opening weekend (a six-day total of $75.5 million), finishing second at the box office behind Rogue One, which was in its second week. It rose 21% in its second weekend to $42.9 million, remaining in second, and grossed $20.8 million in its third week and finishing third. Sing held the record for being the highest-grossing film to never finish first at the U.S. and Canadian box office, beating My Big Fat Greek Wedding ($241.4 million in 2002), until it was surpassed by Oppenheimer, another Universal film, in 2023.

=== Critical response ===
Metacritic review
breakdown (unweighted)

Positive
21 (57%)
Mixed
13 (35%)
Negative
3 (8%)

On the review aggregation website Rotten Tomatoes, 71% of 186 critics' reviews are positive, with an average rating of 6.4/10. The website's consensus reads, "Sing delivers colorfully animated, cheerfully undemanding entertainment with a solid voice cast and a warm-hearted – albeit familiar – storyline that lives up to its title." Metacritic, which uses a weighted average, assigned the film a score of 59 out of 100, based on 37 critics, indicating "mixed or average" reviews. Audiences polled by CinemaScore gave the film an average grade of "A" on an A+ to F scale.

Brian Truitt of USA Today gave the film 3.5 stars (out of 4 stars) and wrote, "In a year full of talking-animal hits, Sing isn't quite as strong a number. It's a tale that might not be particularly thought-provoking but sure is toe-tapping." In her review for the Los Angeles Times, Katie Walsh called Sing, "a cute movie with genuinely funny moments (keep an eye out for the koala car wash), and some great tunes to boot." The Arizona Republic's Bill Goodykoontz was rather mixed about the film in his review and overall said, "Sing is like an album with a good song here and there, but too much filler and not enough hits." Reviewing the version of the film screened at the Toronto International Film Festival, Stefan Pape of the British website HeyUGuys gave the film a mixed review of 2/5, stating that "Garth Jennings's Sing effectively acknowledges early on that it's following a completely unoriginal formula, and yet carries on regardless." While Peter Debruge of Variety, who also saw the film during the same festival, did not find the subplots to have any "profound life lessons", he overall praised Jennings' direction, the cast's voice performances and the film's silliness.

== Accolades ==
Accolades received by Sing (2016 American film)
| Award | Date of ceremony | Category | Recipient(s) | Result | Ref. |
|---|---|---|---|---|---|
| AARP Annual Movies for Grownups Awards | February 6, 2017 | Best Movie for Grownups who Refuse to Grow Up | Sing | Nominated | |
| Annie Awards | February 4, 2017 | Outstanding Achievement, Music in an Animated Feature Production | Joby Talbot | Nominated | |
| Golden Globe Awards | January 8, 2017 | Best Animated Feature Film | Sing | Nominated | |
| Golden Globe Awards | January 8, 2017 | Best Original Song | "Faith" – Ryan Tedder, Stevie Wonder and Francis Farewell Starlite | Nominated | |
| Golden Trailer Awards | June 6, 2017 | Best Music | "Dream On" (Motive Creative) | Nominated | |
| Hollywood Music in Media Awards | November 17, 2016 | Best Song – Animated Film | "Faith" – Ryan Tedder, Stevie Wonder and Francis Farewell Starlite | Nominated | |
| Hollywood Music in Media Awards | November 17, 2016 | Best Soundtrack Album | Sing: Original Motion Picture Soundtrack | Nominated | |
| Hollywood Music in Media Awards | November 17, 2016 | Outstanding Music Supervision – Film | Jojo Villanueva | Won | |
| Nickelodeon Kids' Choice Awards | March 11, 2017 | Favorite Animated Movie | Sing | Nominated | |
| Nickelodeon Kids' Choice Awards | March 11, 2017 | Favorite Voice From an Animated Movie | Reese Witherspoon | Nominated | |
| Nickelodeon Kids' Choice Awards | March 11, 2017 | Most Wanted Pet | Reese Witherspoon | Nominated | |
| Nickelodeon Kids' Choice Awards | March 11, 2017 | Favorite Soundtrack | Sing | Nominated | |
| Saturn Awards | June 28, 2017 | Best Animated Film | Sing | Nominated | |

== Sequels ==
A month after the film's release, Universal and Illumination announced plans for a sequel with writer/director Jennings, producers Meledandri and Healy, and the original cast returning for it. The film was originally scheduled for release on December 25, 2020, but the date was pushed back to July 2, 2021, accommodating the release of DreamWorks Animation’s The Croods: A New Age. Sing 2's release date was further pushed back to December 22, 2021.

In April 2023, Meledandri confirmed a third Sing film is in development.
