= Janet Healy =

American film producer

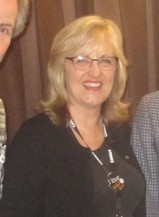
- Janet Healy in 2015
- Occupation: Film producer
- Writing career
- Genre: Animation

Janet Healy is an American film producer whose films include Illumination's Despicable Me animated series and other animated films by the studio.

== Career ==
She worked with directors Stanley Kramer, Hal Ashby and Sam Peckinpah. Healy is a founder of the Visual Effects Society. She then joined George Lucas's Industrial Light & Magic.

In 1995, she joined Walt Disney Animation Studios.

Healy is one of the producers of the Despicable Me franchise as well as other Illumination films including Sing (2016) and The Secret Life of Pets (2016). Beside that, she also produced Shark Tale (2004) for DreamWorks Animation.

== Filmography ==
=== Films ===
Year	Title	Notes
1979	1941	Associate producer
2002	Spirit: Stallion of the Cimarron	Special Thanks
2003	Sinbad: Legend of the Seven Seas	Special Thanks
2004	Shark Tale	Producer
2006	Everyone's Hero	Executive producer
2010	Despicable Me	Producer
2012	The Lorax	Producer
2013	Despicable Me 2	Producer
2015	Minions	Producer
2016	The Secret Life of Pets	Producer
2016	Sing	Producer
2017	Despicable Me 3	Producer
2018	The Grinch	Producer
2019	The Secret Life of Pets 2	Producer
2021	Sing 2	Producer
2022	Minions: The Rise of Gru	Producer
