= The Secret Life of Pets (franchise) =

Illumination media franchise

- Created by: Cinco Paul; Ken Daurio; Brian Lynch
- Original work: The Secret Life of Pets (2016)
- Owner: Universal Pictures (via Illumination)
- Years: 2016-present

Films and television
- Film(s): The Secret Life of Pets (2016); The Secret Life of Pets 2 (2019); The Secret Life of Pets 3 (TBA)
- Short film(s): Norman Television (2016); Weenie (2016); Super Gidget (2019)

Games
- Video game(s): The Secret Life of Pets: Unleashed

Audio
- Soundtrack(s): The Secret Life of Pets; The Secret Life of Pets 2

Miscellaneous
- Theme park attraction(s): The Secret Life of Pets: Off the Leash! (2021–present)

The Secret Life of Pets is an American animated media franchise created by Illumination. Directed by Chris Renaud, the franchise stars the voices of Eric Stonestreet, Kevin Hart, Jenny Slate, Ellie Kemper, Lake Bell, Dana Carvey, Tara Strong, Hannibal Buress, and Bobby Moynihan, among others. The first film, The Secret Life of Pets, was released on July 8, 2016 and received positive reviews from critics. The second film, The Secret Life of Pets 2, was released on June 7, 2019 in the US and received mixed reviews from critics. The series has grossed $1.3 billion so far.

The films follow a group of domesticated house pets who embark on various adventures outside the comfort of their apartment complex.

== Films ==
Film	Release date	Director	Screenwriter	Producer(s)
The Secret Life of Pets	July 8, 2016	Chris Renaud	Cinco Paul & Ken Daurio & Brian Lynch	Chris Meledandri & Janet Healy
The Secret Life of Pets 2	June 7, 2019	Chris Renaud	Brian Lynch	Chris Meledandri & Janet Healy

=== The Secret Life of Pets (2016) ===
Max's luck changes when his owner Katie brings home a new dog named Duke. They have to put their differences aside when they get lost in New York in order to stop a rebellious group of abandoned pets and return home.

=== The Secret Life of Pets 2 (2019) ===
Max and Duke's owner Katie now has a child named Liam, which causes Max to become excessively protective, but a road trip to the countryside will change his mind. Meanwhile, a reformed Snowball teams up with a Shih Tzu named Daisy to help a white tiger named Hu find refuge from an abusive circus owner.

=== The Secret Life of Pets 3 (TBA) ===
In March 2022, in an interview on the podcast The Gary and Kenny Show, Chris Meledandri, CEO of Illumination, stated that a third film is in development. Work on the film's script had begun by 2023.

== Short films ==
=== Norman Television (2016) ===
Included as a mini-movie on The Secret Life of Pets' home media release, the short focuses around Norman from the film as he wanders the vents of Max's apartment and watches various scenarios of the residents.

=== Weenie (2016) ===
Included as the second mini-movie on The Secret Life of Pets' home media release, it features a world of anthropomorphic sausages in which the Mayor shows a little sausage named Timmy how great it is to be a weenie.

=== Super Gidget (2019) ===
Included as a mini-movie on The Secret Life of Pets 2's home media release, the plot focuses on Gidget imagining herself as a superhero and saving Max from an army of squirrels.

== Video games ==
=== The Secret Life of Pets: Unleashed ===
A free-to-play mobile game developed by Electronic Arts, titled The Secret Life of Pets: Unleashed, was released in summer 2016. It was a tile-matching game which featured the characters as one has its own level. In the game, players could combine different toys to earn points. The game, along with Minions Paradise, were both removed from the App Store and Google Play Store on May 22, 2017, the day Illumination and Electronic Arts' partnership had ceased.

== Theme park attraction ==
In April 2019, Universal Studios Hollywood announced a new dark ride attraction entitled The Secret Life of Pets: Off the Leash! which was set to open on March 27, 2020, but the opening was postponed indefinitely due to the COVID-19 pandemic. The attraction eventually opened on April 16, 2021.

The ride's queue is themed after Katie's apartment, and features animatronics of certain characters such as Max, Duke, and Snowball, explaining the ride's plot, which involves the park guests, now “transformed into puppies”, getting ready to be adopted. The ride itself is a highly immersive dark ride with a wide assortment of special effects and over 60 animatronics of characters from the franchise. Riders exit through the gift shop, themed to a pet adoption center. Outside the building's exit, guests can chat with a live-voiced animatronic of Snowball, similar to the meet-and-greet animatronic Donkey from Shrek that is located in several Universal Parks.

== Reception ==
=== Box office performance ===
Film	Release date	Box office gross			All-time ranking		Budget	Ref.
Film	Release date	Domestic	Foreign	Worldwide	Domestic	Worldwide	Budget	Ref.
The Secret Life of Pets	July 8, 2016	$368,623,860	$507,074,301	$875,698,161	46	67	$75 million	
The Secret Life of Pets 2	June 7, 2019	$158,980,250	$272,184,209	$431,164,459	336	293	$80 million	
Total		$527,604,110	$779,258,510	$1,306,862,620			$155 million	

=== Critical and public response ===
Film	Critical		Public	
Film	Rotten Tomatoes	Metacritic	CinemaScore	PostTrak
The Secret Life of Pets	71% (239 reviews)	61 (39 reviews)	A−	85%
The Secret Life of Pets 2	60% (164 reviews)	55 (26 reviews)	A−	—N/a

== Cast and characters ==
Characters	Feature films			Short films
Characters	The Secret Life of Pets	The Secret Life of Pets 2	Norman Television	Super Gidget
Snowball	Kevin Hart	Kevin Hart		
Max	Louis C.K.	Patton Oswalt		Patton Oswalt
Gidget	Jenny Slate	Jenny Slate		Jenny Slate
Duke	Eric Stonestreet	Eric Stonestreet		
Chloe	Lake Bell	Lake Bell		
Pops	Dana Carvey	Dana Carvey		
Buddy	Hannibal Buress	Hannibal Buress		
Mel	Bobby Moynihan	Bobby Moynihan		Bobby Moynihan
Katie	Ellie Kemper	Ellie Kemper		
Norman	Chris Renaud	Chris Renaud	Chris Renaud	
Sweetpea	Tara Strong	Tara Strong		
Tiberius	Albert Brooks			
Ozone	Steve Coogan			
Tattoo	Michael Beattie			
Molly	Kiely Renaud	Kiely Renaud		
Daisy		Tiffany Haddish		
Liam		Henry Lynch		
Rooster		Harrison Ford		
Sergei		Nick Kroll		
Lead Wolf		Michael Beattie		
Cat Lady		Meredith Salenger		
Chuck		Pete Holmes		
Harold			Danny Mann	
Marilyn			Lori Alan	
Infestor				Gilbert Gottfried

=== Crew ===
Role	Main films	
Role	The Secret Life of Pets	The Secret Life of Pets 2
Directed by	Chris Renaud	Chris Renaud
Directed by	Co-director: Yarrow Cheney	Co-director: Jonathan del Val
Produced by	Chris Meledandri; Janet Healy	Chris Meledandri; Janet Healy
Written by	Cinco Paul; Ken Daurio; Brian Lynch	Brian Lynch
Music by	Alexandre Desplat	Alexandre Desplat
Edited by	Ken Schretzmann	Tiffany Hillkurtz
Production company	Illumination	Illumination
Distributed by	Universal Pictures	Universal Pictures
