= Hop (film) =

2011 film by Tim Hill

- Theatrical release poster
- Directed by: Tim Hill
- Screenplay by: Cinco Paul Ken Daurio; Brian Lynch
- Story by: Cinco Paul; Ken Daurio
- Produced by: Chris Meledandri; Michele Imperato Stabile
- Starring: James Marsden; Russell Brand; Kaley Cuoco; Hank Azaria; Gary Cole; Elizabeth Perkins; David Hasselhoff; Chelsea Handler; Hugh Laurie
- Cinematography: Peter Lyons Collister
- Edited by: Peter S. Elliot; Gregory Perler
- Music by: Christopher Lennertz
- Production companies: Universal Pictures; Relativity Media; Illumination Entertainment
- Distributed by: Universal Pictures
- Release dates: March 27, 2011 (Universal Studios Hollywood); April 1, 2011 (United States)
- Running time: 95 minutes
- Country: United States (Note: Attributed to multiple sources:)
- Language: English
- Budget: $63 million
- Box office: $188 million

Hop (also known as Hop: The Movie) is a 2011 American Easter comedy film directed by Tim Hill and written by Cinco Paul, Ken Daurio, and Brian Lynch, from a story by Paul and Daurio. Produced by Universal Pictures, Illumination Entertainment and Relativity Media, it stars James Marsden, Kaley Cuoco, Gary Cole, Elizabeth Perkins, David Hasselhoff, and Chelsea Handler, with the voices of Russell Brand, Hank Azaria, and Hugh Laurie. The film follows a young rabbit (Brand) who would rather drum in a band than succeed his father (Laurie) as the Easter Bunny, and befriends a human slacker (Marsden) seeking a job.

Hop was based on an original idea by John Cohen; production began in 2009 under the name I Hop, with Cohen and Chris Meledandri serving as producers. It was announced as a live-action animated hybrid feature, a first for Illumination, originally aiming for a spring 2010 release date. Cohen later departed Illumination, with Michele Imperato Stabile producing alongside Meledandri, while Cohen remained part of the project as executive producer. The animation and visual effects were provided by Los Angeles-based Rhythm & Hues Studios (R&H), while Christopher Lennertz composed the score, marking his second collaboration with Hill after Alvin and the Chipmunks (2007).

Hop premiered at Universal Studios Hollywood on March 27, 2011, and was theatrically released in the United States on April 1 by Universal Pictures. The film received negative reviews from critics and was a commercial success, grossing $188 million worldwide on a $63 million budget. It was nominated for Outstanding Achievement for Character Animation in a Live Action Production at the 39th Annie Awards.

== Plot ==
On Easter Island, a young rabbit named E.B. is destined to succeed his father as the Easter Bunny. Ignoring his father's orders, E.B. runs away to Hollywood to pursue his dream of becoming a music drummer. In Van Nuys, E.B. is hit by Fred O'Hare, an out-of-work, job-hopping slacker who was driving to his sister Sam's boss's house to house-sit after his parents forced him to move out. Feigning injury, E.B. persuades Fred to take him in whilst E.B. recovers. But when E.B. causes trouble, Fred attempts to release him in the wilderness. However, E.B. persuades Fred to let him stay by claiming to be the Easter Bunny, who Fred witnessed delivering eggs as a child; since then, Fred has been infatuated with Easter.

Meanwhile, Mr. Bunny sends his royal guards, the Pink Berets, to search for him and bring him back. In Hollywood, E.B. sees the Berets closing in on him and hides inside a business where Fred is having a job interview. E.B. enjoys a successful recording session as the substitute drummer for The Blind Boys of Alabama, but ruins Fred's job interview. In the process, E.B. gets a tip about a possible audition for David Hasselhoff. After E.B. performs for him, Hasselhoff invites him to perform on his show.

Afterwards, Fred attends his adoptive younger sister Alex's school Easter pageant with E.B. hiding in a satchel. E.B. spots three bunny suit shadows on a wall and assumes the Pink Berets have found him. Disgusted by Alex's awful rendition of "Peter Cottontail", he dashes out and disrupts the show. Fred fakes being a ventriloquist with E.B. as his dummy, and the two upstage the show singing, "I Want Candy." Both Fred's father, Henry, and Alex are angry and upset about the upstaging, but Fred is inspired to be the Easter Bunny himself. Although skeptical, E.B. agrees to train him and finds that Fred has some genuine talent for it.

Meanwhile, the Easter Bunny's best friend and second-in-command, Carlos the Chick, secretly plots a coup d'état against him to take over Easter, inspiring the chicks to uprise against the bunnies, and begins training to become the "Easter Chick". The next morning, as E.B. is about to go to Hasselhoff's show, he notices the Pink Berets and prepares a decoy to fake his death, leaving Fred behind. The Berets see the decoy and, horrified that Fred has apparently killed E.B., capture him and take him to Easter Island. Fred is confronted by Mr. Bunny and Carlos. Carlos then seizes control of the Easter factory, tying up Mr. Bunny and placing him and Fred on a conveyor belt to be boiled alive. Meanwhile, E.B. starts to feel guilty for leaving Fred, and is convinced by Hasselhoff on his show to go back and help his friend.

E.B. races back to the factory to confront Carlos, but he is immobilized in gummy candy and tossed into the chocolate bunny carving line. E.B. survives by dodging the blades of the machine, while Fred eats through the black-licorice ropes, escaping with Mr. Bunny. Carlos turns into a mutant anthropomorphic chick-bunny hybrid due to the magic of the Egg of Destiny, and battles E.B., easily defeating him due to his size. Carlos then tries to lead the Egg Sleigh out with one of his assistants Phil directing, but E.B. improvises a drum session that drives Phil to uncontrollably dance to the beat and provide the wrong signals, causing the sleigh to crash and subdue Carlos. E.B. and his father reconcile, and he and Fred are crowned co-Easter bunnies. Back at home, Fred reconciles with his father and his family, and then takes off with E.B. back to Easter Island.

== Cast ==
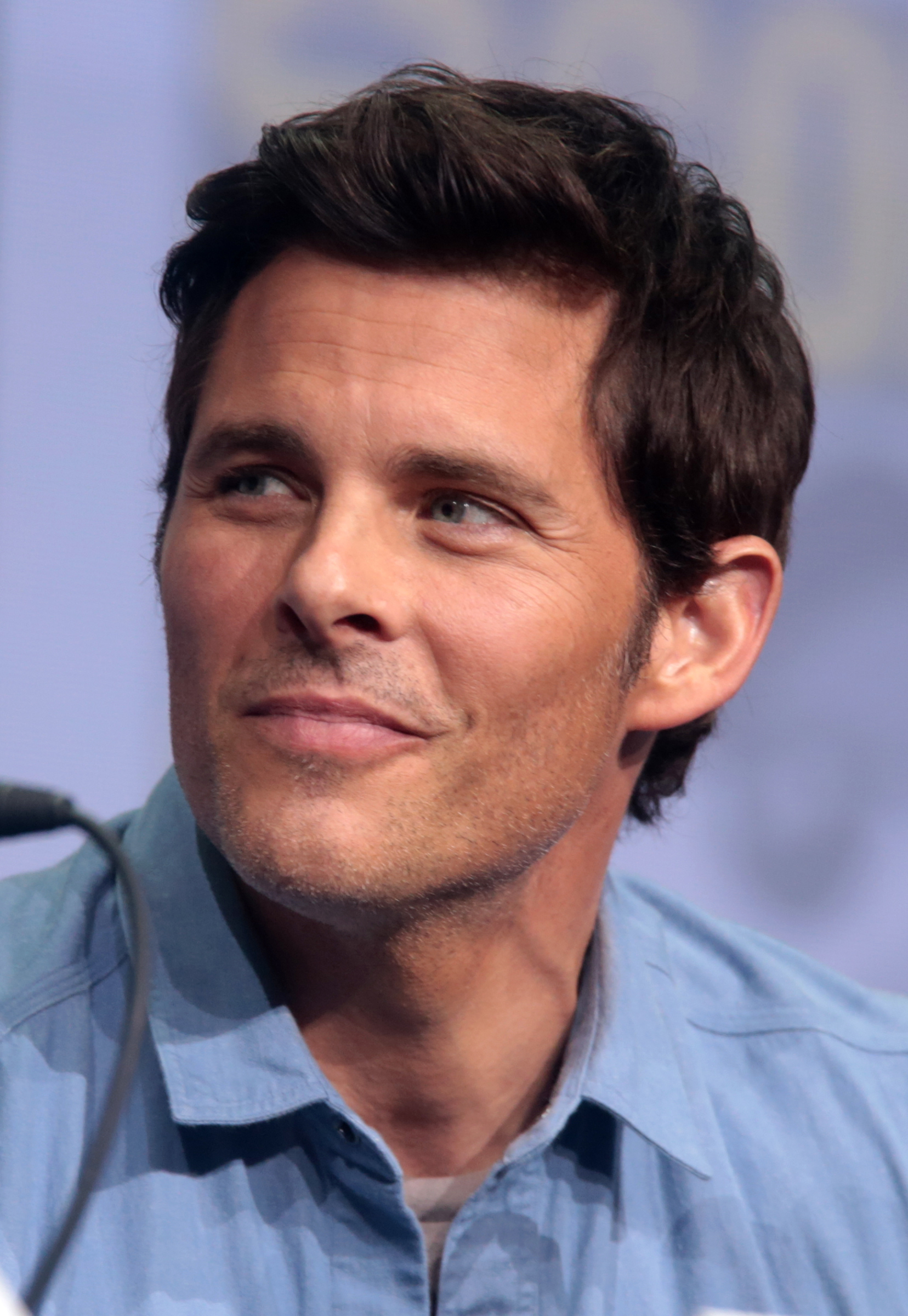
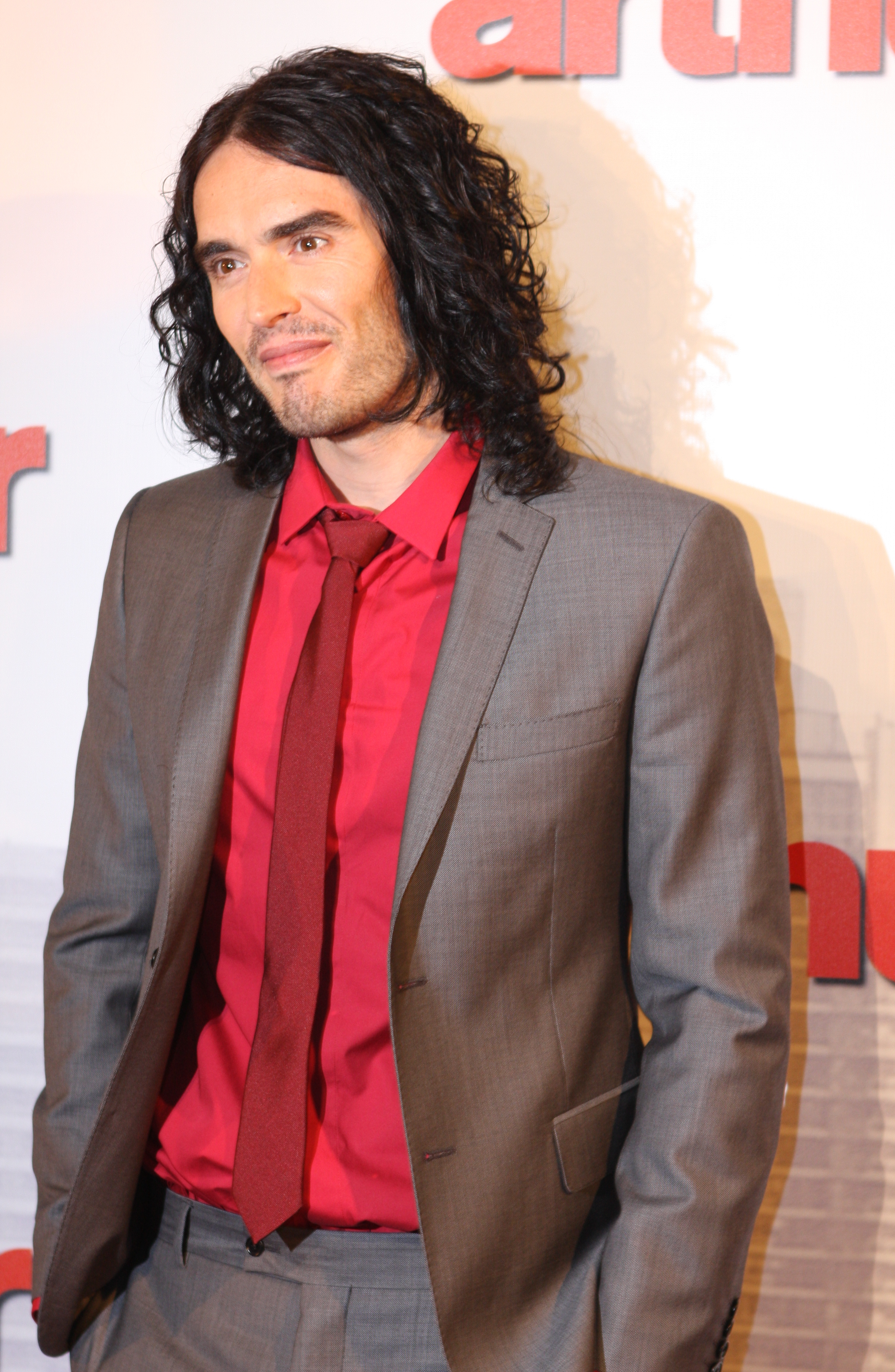
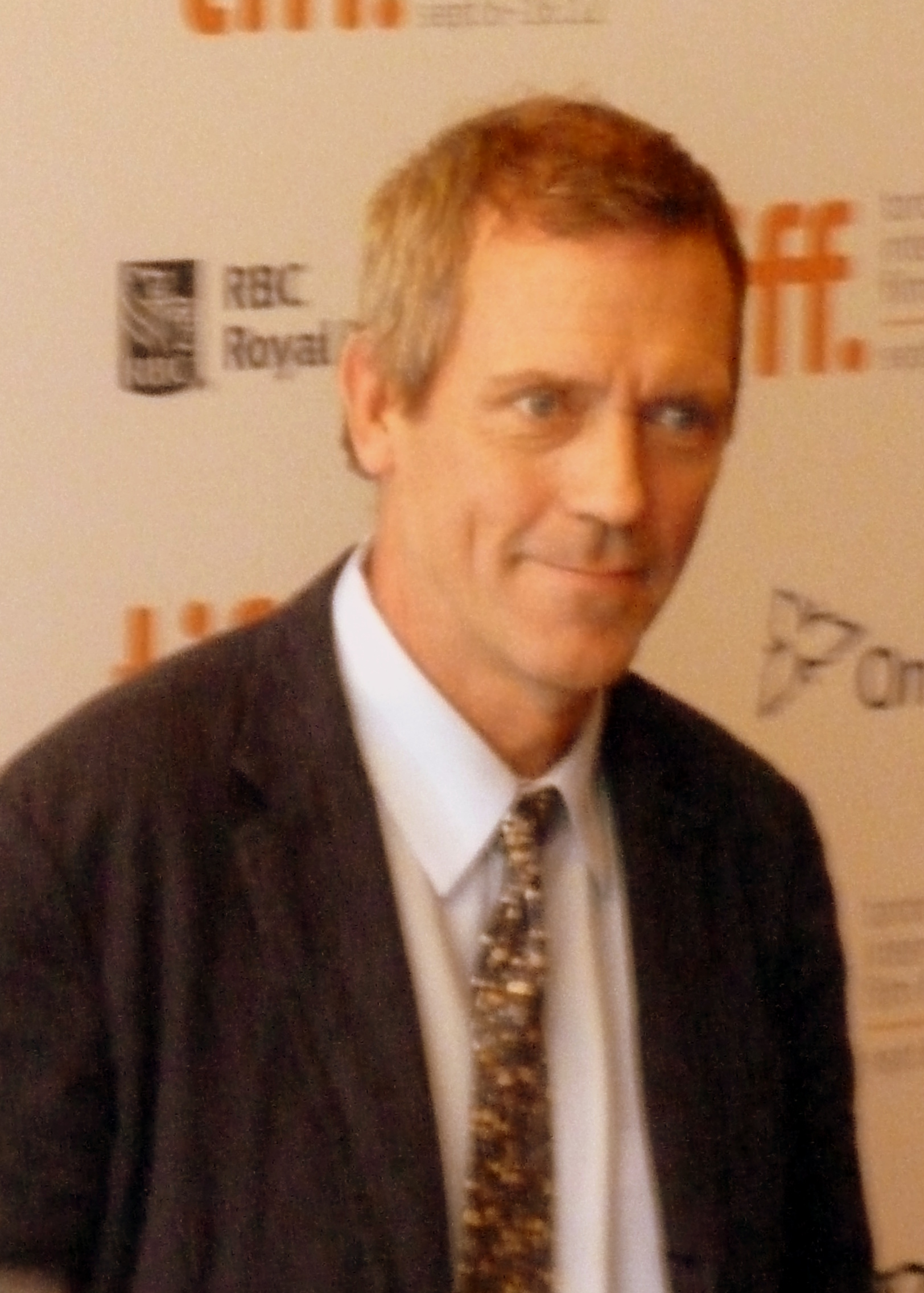
L-R: James Marsden, Russell Brand, and Hugh Laurie star as Fred O'Hare, E.B., and Mr. Bunny, respectively.

=== Live-action cast ===
- James Marsden as Frederick "Fred" O'Hare, a slacker who is trying to find work
  - Coleton Ray as Young Fred
- Kaley Cuoco as Samantha "Sam" O'Hare, Fred's sister
- Gary Cole as Henry O'Hare, Fred's father
- Elizabeth Perkins as Bonnie O'Hare, Fred's mother
- Tiffany Espensen as Alexandra "Alex" O'Hare, Fred's adoptive younger sister
- David Hasselhoff as himself, a talent show host
- Chelsea Handler as Mrs. Beck, a video game company representative and Fred's interviewer
- Dustin Ybarra as Cody
- Russell Brand as a "Hoff Knows Talent" production assistant

The American gospel group The Blind Boys of Alabama make an appearance in the film as themselves.

=== Voice cast ===
- Russell Brand as E.B., a teenage anthropomorphic rabbit who dreams of becoming a drummer rather than following his father's footsteps to be the next Easter Bunny
  - Django Marsh as Young E.B.
- Hank Azaria as Carlos, a Spanish-accented chick who is the Easter Bunny's good friend and assistant, secretly scheming to take over Easter Island
  - Azaria also voices Phil, one of Carlos' assistants.
- Hugh Laurie as Mr. Bunny (credited as "E.B.'s Dad"), E.B.'s father who is the current Easter Bunny
- Hugh Hefner as Voice at Playboy Mansion

== Production ==
=== Development ===
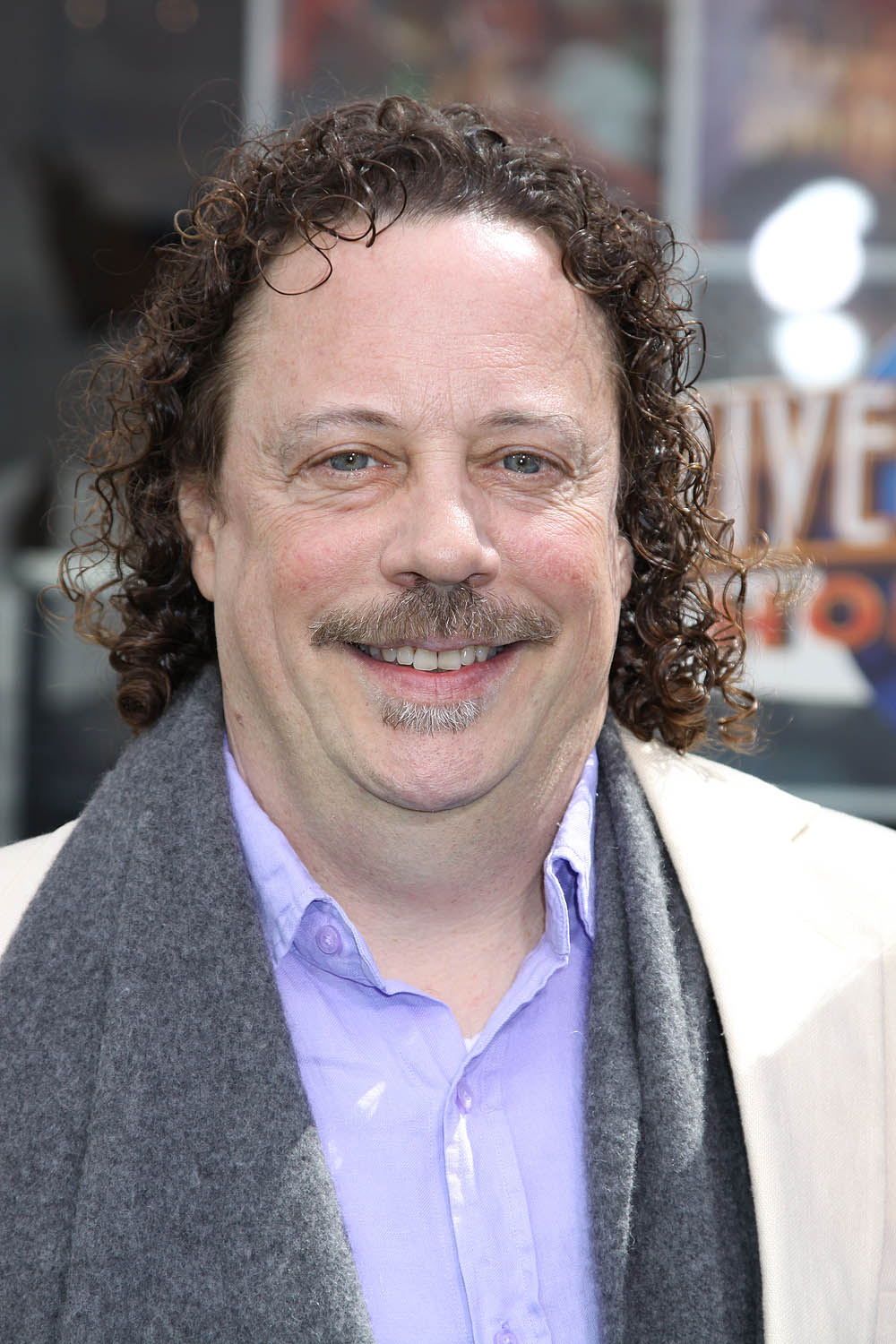
Director Tim Hill, pictured at the film's premiere at Universal Studios Hollywood in March 2011

Hop was based on an original idea by producer John Cohen. On April 3, 2009, Cinco Paul and Ken Daurio, the screenwriters of Despicable Me, were hired to write the script under its original title, I Hop, as a live-action animated Easter-themed feature with Chris Meledandri and Cohen producing, aiming for a spring 2010 release. On July 14, 2009, its release date was moved to March 4, 2011, and Tim Hill was attached to direct, marking his third live-action animated directorial effort after Garfield: A Tail of Two Kitties (2006) and Alvin and the Chipmunks (2007).

On September 3, 2010, the release date was moved to April 1, 2011, and its title was changed to the current one. In addition, it was announced that Brian Lynch would be penning the screenplay with Paul and Daurio, after signing an exclusive deal at Illumination Entertainment. Cohen later departed Illumination, but he was credited as an executive producer, with Michele Imperato Stabile joining Meledandri as producer. Relativity Media joined co-production before the film's release.

=== Casting ===
On July 14, 2009, the same day the film's release date was moved, Russell Brand was cast in the lead voice role. In an interview with Rebecca Murray of About.com (now People Inc.), Brand stated: "That's a great deal of pressure for me. I now know how Colin Firth felt playing George the V. It's a great deal of duty, a lot of heritage, and a huge obligation to get it right." Brand also remarked: "I think because he's a cheeky little bunny and I've described as such even before the casting." When asked if it was tough to keep the film at a PG-rated level, Brand said: "That's not up to me. I just say anything I like. I think if I said anything unusual, they just cut it out."

James Marsden was cast as Fred O'Hare on January 25, 2010. Marsden stated in an interview to Rebecca Murray of About.com: "It's me and Russell Brand. He plays the Easter Bunny who doesn't want to be the Easter Bunny. I'm a sort of slacker, still living at home, late 20s/early 30s year old who's trying to find his purpose in life. They stumble into each other - and then I would ruin it for you if I went on." On the topic of Marsden being cast as Fred O'Hare, Tim Hill stated in a behind-the-scenes featurette: "He's not only really funny, but he's a really grounded actor. He always wants to know where the truth is... ...about the character and where it's coming from."

=== Animation and design ===
Los Angeles-based Rhythm & Hues Studios (R&H) handled the film's animation and visual effects. Artist Peter de Sève, who designed the characters for Blue Sky Studios' Ice Age franchise, designed the animated characters for Hop. Ray Chen was the visual effects supervisor, and Andy Arnett was the animation director.

Rhythm & Hues looked at the actions of real rabbits for some scenes. Arnett said, "One of the things that can happen with these faces is that if you don't put a lot of detail into the entire face, their mouths and cheeks can look kind of stiff. So it was important to us to be able to get a lot of flexibility in the face to make them feel alive and fleshy." The easter egg factory involved Rhythm & Hues completing 250 computer-generated shots. Chen notes, "It's almost like a little full CG film inside the big film. The biggest challenge there was actually designing the factory. It originally had more of an underground feel with roots and rocks before we settled on something that looked more cathedral-like."

As of 2026, this is the only film produced by Illumination Entertainment that combines live-action imagery with computer-animation, as most of the studio's features following Hop were fully animated at Illumination Mac Guff (now Illumination Studios Paris) after Mac Guff's feature animation unit was acquired by Illumination on November 14, 2011; Universal Pictures, however, stated in a February 2013 report by TheWrap that Illumination "will, at some point, make a live-action movie".

== Music ==
Christopher Lennertz was revealed to be composing the score for Hop on March 6, 2011, marking his second collaboration with director Tim Hill after Alvin and the Chipmunks (2007). Back Lot Music released the soundtrack on iTunes, Amazon Music, and Spotify on March 29, 2011, while Varèse Sarabande released it on CD on April 5.

Australian pop singer Cody Simpson performed a cover of the Strangeloves' 1965 standard "I Want Candy" for the film (with Bow Wow Wow's 1982 version previously being featured in some trailers for the film).

== Release ==
Hop held its world premiere at Universal Studios Hollywood on March 27, 2011, and was theatrically released in the United States on April 1 by Universal Pictures. It was previously scheduled for release in spring 2010, though on July 14, 2009, the release was pushed back to March 4, 2011. It was then pushed back again to its current release date on September 3, 2010.

=== Promotion and marketing ===
Universal teamed up with 92 major companies to promote Hop, including Holiday Inn, Krispy Kreme, Lindt, Kraft Foods, The Hershey Company, Build-A-Bear Workshop, Comcast (which acquired Universal's parent company NBCUniversal two months before the film was released), Kodak, Hallmark, HMV, and Burger King. A large range of licensed merchandise was released in connection with the film, including toys, stuffed animals, many sorts of candy, T-shirts, cookie decorating kits, baked goods and other products from Kraft Foods. Some items were available exclusively at Walmart stores.

The teaser poster for Hop was revealed on November 20, 2010, while the teaser trailer was released on November 23. The teaser depicts E.B. assembling a drum set, before playing a drum cover of "Song 2" by English rock band Blur on said set. The theatrical trailer was released on February 10, 2011, which depicts various clips from the movie; songs featured in the trailer include "The Anthem" by Good Charlotte and "I Want Candy" by Cody Simpson.

Nine promotional TV spots were featured during the film's marketing campaign. These include: "Easter Chicks", "Fur Will Fly", "Delivers", "Plan", "Adventure", "See the World", "In Common", "Easter Factory", and "Battle Bunny".

=== Video games ===
A tie-in video game was released for the Nintendo DS alongside the film. On March 29, 2011, a crossover game between Hop and Doodle Jump was released on the App Store for iOS devices. As part of Doodle Jump's in-app purchases, the player can select a new level by setting their name as "Hop" at Hop's game over screen.

=== Home media ===
Universal Pictures Home Entertainment released Hop on DVD and Blu-ray on March 23, 2012. Physical copies include featurettes and games, with a short film Phil's Dance Party.

=== Theme parks ===
Starting in April 2011, Hop characters would appear at Universal Studios Florida and Universal Studios Hollywood for shows and meet and greets to help promote the film. It would also get its own unit in Universal's Superstar Parade at Florida in May 2012, before it was replaced by a Secret Life of Pets-themed unit in November 2016.

== Reception ==
=== Box office ===
Hop earned $108.1 million in the United States and Canada and $80.4 million in other countries, for a worldwide total of $188.5 million. It was the 39th-highest-grossing film of 2011. To date, Hop is the lowest-grossing film released by Illumination.

In the United States and Canada, Hop was released on April 1, 2011. It earned $11.5 million on its first day. The film debuted earning $38 million across 3,579 theaters. Its second weekend earnings dropped by 42 percent to $21.7 million, and followed by another $11.1 million the third weekend. Hop left theaters by August 19, 2011, making it the year's 25th-highest-grossing film.

=== Critical response ===
Hop was praised for its animation, music, and performances from the cast, particularly Marsden, but criticized for its humor, pacing and script. On review aggregation website Rotten Tomatoes, 25% of 136 critics' reviews were positive, with an average rating of 4.3/10. The website's consensus states: "It's impressively animated, but Hop's script is so uninspired that not even James Marsden's frantic mugging can give it any bounce." Metacritic, which uses a weighted average, assigned the film a score of 41 out of 100, based on 23 critics, indicating "mixed or average" reviews. Audiences polled by CinemaScore gave the film an average grade of "A−" on an A+ to F scale.

Peter Debruge of Variety gave the film a positive review, writing: "Hop integrates animated characters into live-action settings, relying on director Tim Hill to handle the logistics of convincingly blending both worlds," also noting it was "hilariously un-PC," while Keith Phipps of The A.V. Club gave the film a grade of "D+", writing: "Anyone bewailing the near-absence of tacky family films inspired by Easter need bewail no more: Hop has arrived to fill the void." Owen Gleiberman of Entertainment Weekly gave the film a "D" grade, calling it "Alvin and the Chipmunks with only one chipmunk, and (if possible) even less fun." Robert Abele awarded the film two stars out of five, writing: "The only thing missing is any real wonder, imagination, or comic verve." Kirk Honeycutt of The Hollywood Reporter gave the film a positive review, calling it "a fun and funny mix of live-action and animation that puts the hop back into Easter."

The subplot involving Carlos the Easter Chick was considered to be insensitive to Mexican Americans by Jon Shore of Crosswalk, who called the film "so racist it hurts". Philip French of The Guardian wrote: "It's a combination of the worst movies about trouble in Santa Claus's north pole toy factory and a version of Charlie and the Chocolate Factory lethally laced with sugar." Also writing for The Guardian, Peter Bradshaw gave it one star out of four and called it a "soulless and depressing film, with plasticky production design."

=== Accolades ===
Award	Date of ceremony	Category	Recipient(s)	Result	Ref(s)
Annie Awards	February 4, 2012	Outstanding Achievement for Character Animation in a Live Action Production	Andy Arnett (Rhythm & Hues Studios)	Nominated	
BMI Film and TV Awards	May 19, 2011	Film Music	Christopher Lennertz	Won	
Golden Reel Awards	February 19, 2012	Outstanding Achievement in Sound Editing – Feature Underscore	J.J. George (supervising music editor); Bryon Rickerson (music editor)	Nominated	
Golden Trailer Awards	2011	Best Animation/Family	"Battle for Easter"	Nominated	
Golden Trailer Awards	2011	Best Animation/Family TV Spot	"Carrot Quiz"	Nominated	

== Lawsuit ==
On March 28, 2014, artist Scott Westmoreland filed a lawsuit against Comcast, Relativity Media, Illumination Entertainment, and Rhythm & Hues Studios (R&H) for "containing unauthorized reproductions" of Westmoreland's painting Starting Lineup, which was alleged to have been shown a few times in the movie.

== See also ==
- List of Easter films

== Bibliography ==
- "Hop Production Notes" (PDF). www.iwantcandy.com. Archived from the original (PDF) on April 9, 2011.
