= Roland Meledandri =

American fashion designer

Roland Meledandri (January 13, 1929 - July 19, 1980) was an American fashion designer who specialized in designing menswear.

== Life ==
Meledandri founded his clothing store, named Meledandri after himself, in 1961. Meledandri hired unemployed actors to work as salespeople, dressing them in his own products to attract customers. He disliked the conservative nature of men's fashion at the time, and sold suits that were more closely fitting, with dark-patterned shirts and wider ties than was the norm. The shop was noted for being frequented by a wide range of politicians and celebrities. Meledandri died on July 19, 1980, of a heart attack. His son is Chris Meledandri, a film producer and the founder and CEO of Illumination.
