= The Light Between Oceans (soundtrack) =

The Light Between Oceans (Original Motion Picture Soundtrack)

Film score by Alexandre Desplat
- Released: September 2, 2016
- Genre: Film score
- Length: 62:12
- Label: Lakeshore
- Producer: Alexandre Desplat

Alexandre Desplat chronology
The Secret Life of Pets (2016)	The Light Between Oceans (2016)	American Pastoral (2016)

The Light Between Oceans (Original Motion Picture Soundtrack) is the soundtrack to the 2016 film of the same name featuring the original score composed by Alexandre Desplat released on September 2, 2016 by Lakeshore Records. A vinyl edition of the film's score was released at a first pressing of 500 copies on October 31.

== Reception ==
Several critical remarks for the score, considered Desplat's score as "melodic", "effulgent", "lush" and "overcooked".

Stephen Holden of The New York Times wrote that Desplat's "lush score washes over it like an endless tide". David Ehrlich of IndieWire wrote "the swooning romances scored by the great Alexandre Desplat, the film — much like the twinkling musical tempest the French composer wrote for it — is lush and lacking in equal measure." Brian Trutt of USA Today said that the composer's "majestic and stirring string and piano melodies" made the film more wonderous. Den of Geek writer Mark Harrison said: "Alexandre Desplat's uncharacteristically cloying score reaches fever pitch before the real emotional bombshells have a chance to register and by the end, it feels like you're being led by the soundtrack rather than the story." David Sims of The Atlantic wrote Desplat's "paint-by-numbers piano score builds on the soundtrack". Sydney Cohen of The Michigan Daily wrote that "it's no surprise that the score is incredible".

== Track listing ==
No.	Title	Length
1.	"Letters"	2:00
2.	"Tom"	3:06
3.	"At First Sight"	3:13
4.	"The Dinghy"	2:20
5.	"Isabel"	1:27
6.	"In God's Hands"	4:56
7.	"The Rattle"	2:35
8.	"To Resent"	4:35
9.	"Janus"	1:48
10.	"A Wonderful Father"	3:21
11.	"Lucy Grace"	3:33
12.	"Path of Light"	2:36
13.	"The Return"	3:59
14.	"Hannah Roennfeldt"	2:19
15.	"Still Your Husband"	4:57
16.	"To Forgive"	1:39
17.	"Each Day We Spent Together"	4:48
18.	"To Be Loved"	4:58
19.	"The Light Between Oceans"	4:02
Total length:		62:12

== Credits ==
Credits adapted from CD liner notes.

- Composer – Alexandre Desplat
- Score producer – Dominique Lemonnier
- Programming – Romain Allender
- Recording, mixing – Joel Iwataki, Joel Iwataki
- Music editor – Suzana Perić
- Auricle operator – John Carbonara
- Pro-tools operator – Angie Teo
- Assistant engineer – Fred Sladkey
- Music co-ordinator – Xavier Forcioli
- Music preparation – Claude Romano, Norbert Vergonjanne, Mark Graham
- Music librarian – Jason Loffredo

Instruments

- Bass – Brad Aikman, Daniel Krekeler, Jeff Carney, Lou Kosma, Rachel Calin, Shawn Conley
- Cello – Brook Speltz, Kathe Jarka, Mina Smith, Nathan Vickery, Nick Canellakis, Sarah Seiver, Sophie Shao
- Clarinet – Dean LeBlanc, Pascual Forteza
- English horn – Keisuke Ikuma
- Flute – Mindy Kaufman, Tanya Witek
- Harp – Tori Drake
- Horn – Alana Vegter, Chad Yarbrough, Javier Gandara, Leelanee Sterrett
- Oboe – Grace Shryock
- Piano – Ieva Jokubaviciute
- Trombone – Demian Austin, Paul Pollard, Tim Albright
- Tuba – Andy Bove
- Viola – Danielle Farina, David Creswell, Karin Brown, Mark Holloway, Mary Hammann, Maurycy Banaszek, Milena Pajaro, Natalia Lipkina, Nick Cords, Robert Rinehart
- Violin – Ann Lehmann, Cathy Sim, Liz Lim, Ellen De Pasquale, Emily Popham, Hyunju Lee, Jeanine Wynton, Jessica Lee, Joanna Maurer, Joyce Hammann, Jung Sun Yoo, Katherine Fong, Marta Krechkovsky, Matt Lehmann, Ming Hsin, Nancy McAlhany, Qianqian Li, Shan Jiang, Sharon Yamada, Suzanne Ornstein, Wen Qian, Yuri Namkung

Orchestra

- Conductor – Alexandre Desplat, Solrey
- Orchestra conductor – Sandra Park
- Orchestration – Alexandre Desplat, Jean-Pascal Beintus, Nicolas Charron, Sylvain Morizet

Management

- Executive producer for Lakeshore Records – Brian McNelis, Skip Williamson
- Liner notes – Alexandre Desplat, Derek Cianfrance
- A&R – Eric Craig
- Art direction, design – John Bergin
