= Michael Beattie (actor) =

Canadian actor

Michael Beattie is a Canadian actor. He has played voice roles in several Illumination studio animated films, starting with The Lorax in 2012.

== Filmography ==
=== Film ===
- Care Bears Nutcracker Suite - The Nutcracker (voice)
- Swept Away - Todd
- The Bet - Detective
- Cats & Dogs: The Revenge of Kitty Galore - Angus MacDougall (voice)
- The Lorax - 2nd Marketing Guy (voice)
- Minions - VNC Announcer, Walter Jr. (voice)
- The Secret Life of Pets - Tattoo (voice)
- Despicable Me 3 - TV Show Host / Scar-Faced Man (voice)
- The Grinch - Store Clerk (voice)
- The Secret Life of Pets 2 - Lead Wolf / Skinny Cat (voice)
- Minions: The Rise of Gru - VNC Announcer (voice)

=== Television ===
- Countdown to Looking Glass - Youth #1 (Television film)
- The Edison Twins - Russell (Episode: "One Way Ticket")
- Beverly Hills Teens - Buck Huckster, Wilshire Brentwood (voice) (Episode: "Dream Date")
- The Care Bears - (voice)
- Friday the 13th: The Series - Photographer (Episode: "Eye of Death")
- Babar - Additional voices
- The Adventures of T-Rex - Buck, Chief Delaney (voice)
- Conan the Adventurer - Greywolf, Needle (voice)
- Murder One - Swaboda (Episode: "Chapter Nine, Year Two")
- Brooklyn South - 1st Photographer (Episode: "Exposing Johnson")
- As Told by Ginger - Principal Erickson, Cameraman (voice)

=== Videogames ===
- Spider-Man - Shocker
- The Hobbit - Bilbo Baggins (Credited as Michael Beatie)
- Pitfall: The Lost Expedition - Leech, Pusca, Explorer
- Spider-Man 2 - Shocker
- World of Warcraft - Additional voices
- Titan Quest - Additional voices
- Saints Row - Stilwater's Resident
- Company of Heroes - Additional voices
- The Sopranos: Road to Respect - Additional voices
- Saints Row 2 - Additional voices
- Dragon Age: Origins - Additional voices
- Mass Effect 2 - Mordin Solus
- Star Wars: The Old Republic - Various
- World of Warcraft: Mists of Pandaria - Additional voices
- Metal Gear Rising: Revengeance - Blade Wolf / LQ-84i
- Marvel Heroes - Northstar
- Despicable Me: Minion Rush - Villaintriloquist and Puppet
- Mad Max - The Outcrier
