= Chris Meledandri =

American film producer (born 1959)

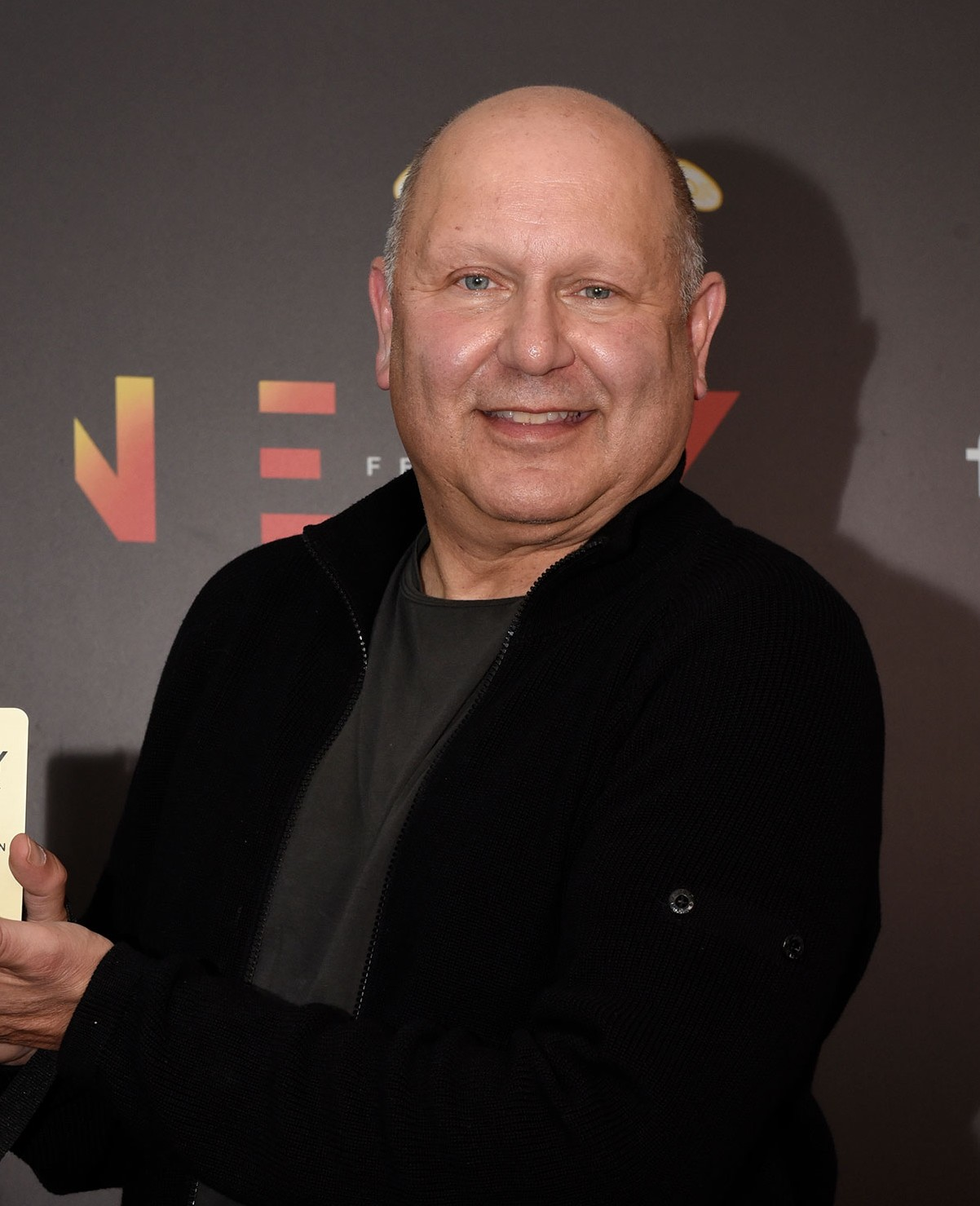
- Meledandri in 2023
- Born: Christopher Meledandri; May 15, 1959 (age 67); New York City, U.S.
- Education: Dartmouth College
- Occupation: Film producer
- Years active: 1984–present
- Employers: 20th Century Fox Animation (1998–2007); Illumination (2007–present); DreamWorks Animation (2016–present)
- Notable work: Ice Age; Robots; Ice Age: The Meltdown; Horton Hears a Who!; Despicable Me; Minions; The Secret Life of Pets; Sing; The Super Mario Bros. Movie
- Title: President of 20th Century Fox Animation; Founder and CEO of Illumination
- Board member of: Nintendo (non-executive; 2023–present)
- Spouse: Leslie Benzinger (m. 2002; div. 2016)
- Children: 2
- Awards: Legion of Honour (Knight (Chevalier))

Christopher Meledandri (/mɛləˈdɑːndri/; born May 15, 1959) is an American film producer. He is the founder and CEO of Illumination. He previously served as president of 20th Century Fox Animation, working as the executive producer for the Blue Sky Studios-produced films Ice Age (2002), Robots (2005), Ice Age: The Meltdown (2006), and Horton Hears a Who! (2008). Since 2010, he has worked as the producer for the film series of Despicable Me, The Secret Life of Pets, and Sing. In 2021, he joined Nintendo's board of directors after working with the video game company on The Super Mario Bros. Movie (2023). Meledandri also collaborates with Illumination's corporate sibling DreamWorks Animation since 2016.

== Early life and education ==
Meledandri was born on May 15, 1959 in New York City to Roland Meledandri, a men's fashion designer, and Risha Meledandri, an activist, and grew up on the Upper East Side of Manhattan. His father was of Italian descent. Meledandri attended Dartmouth College.

== Career ==
=== Early career and work at 20th Century Fox Animation ===
Meledandri's first job in the film industry came when he worked as an assistant to executive producer Daniel Melnick on the set of Footloose. He co-founded the production company The Meledandri/Gordon Company (with Mark Gordon) until he left in 1991. Meledandri afterwards was the producer for a series of small films, before working as a producer for the 1993 Disney film Cool Runnings, which was a financial success. Soon after Meledandri was hired by 20th Century Fox, where executives presumed that the success of Cool Runnings showcased Meledandri's ability to produce financially successful family films. After a series of collaborations with filmmaker John Hughes, Meledandri was placed in charge of 20th Century Fox Animation. One of the first films released under Meledandri's tutelage was the Don Bluth-directed animated science fiction film Titan A.E. (2000), a costly box office bomb whose failure almost caused him to be fired, and which caused Fox Animation Studios to be shut down.

==== 1998–2007: Work at Blue Sky Studios ====
In 1998, Meledandri led Fox's acquisition of fledgling visual effects house Blue Sky Studios, which became a commercially successful production studio. He oversaw the creative and business operations of Blue Sky, which became wholly owned by Fox. While at the studio, Meledandri supervised and/or executive produced films including Ice Age (2002), Robots (2005), Ice Age: The Meltdown (2006) and Horton Hears a Who! (2008). He also produced two animated shorts, Gone Nutty (2002) and No Time for Nuts (2006); both were nominated for an Academy Award for Best Animated Short Film.

=== 2007–present: Work at Illumination ===
Meledandri left as President of 20th Century Fox Animation in early 2007, being replaced by Vanessa Morrison, and founded Illumination, an animation company that was co-owned by Universal Pictures, which fully financed and owned the films. Fox had attempted to retain Meledandri, but it was reported by the Los Angeles Times that Universal's offer of an ownership stake in Illumination had persuaded him to switch. Meledandri received a share of Illumination's box office earnings as part of his contract with Universal, and as of 2011, he also owned an undisclosed stake in the production company. In 2010, Illumination released its first film, Despicable Me, a box office success. Meledandri built a relationship with chairman of NBCUniversal Stephen Burke, who liked Meledandri's propensity for producing animated films on a relatively low budget. Illumination released a film version of Dr. Seuss' The Lorax, which continued the successful collaboration between Meledandri and the Dr. Seuss estate. He also produced all of Despicable Me's various sequels and spin-offs.

=== 2016–present: Work with DreamWorks Animation and Nintendo ===
On April 28, 2016, NBCUniversal announced its intent to acquire Illumination's competitor studio DreamWorks Animation for $3.8 billion. It was announced that Meledandri would at the time oversee both Illumination and DreamWorks following the completion of the acquisition. However, it was later announced that Meledandri had declined to oversee DreamWorks, and would instead be a consultant at the studio. On November 6, 2018, it was announced that Meledandri would be collaborating with Universal and DreamWorks to revive the Shrek franchise. Meledandri however intended to retain the original voice actors, as he believes they were perhaps the most memorable parts of the series. The first film in this collaboration, Puss in Boots: The Last Wish, in which Meledandri served as executive producer, was released in December 2022 to critical acclaim and commercial success.

In January 2018, Nintendo announced during a fiscal meeting that Illumination would be developing an animated Mario film and that Meledandri would co-produce the film with Super Mario creator Shigeru Miyamoto. On July 5, 2021, it was reported that Meledandri would join Nintendo's board of directors "as an independent and non-executive outside director" to advise Nintendo as the company develops more films under Nintendo Pictures.

Meledandri will serve as a producer on Shrek 5 for DreamWorks, set for release on June 30, 2027.

== Personal life ==
Meledandri is a member of The Academy of Motion Picture Arts and Sciences, and is a member of the board of trustees at The Hotchkiss School in Lakeville, Connecticut.

Meledandri was married to Leslie Benziger from 2002 to 2016. He has two sons, born in 1990 and 1998.

On July 15, 2026, French President Emmanuel Macron presented him with the prestigious insignia of Knight of the Legion of Honour (Chevalier de la Légion d'Honneur) at the Élysée Palace in Paris. The award recognized his significant contributions to cinema and his major impact on advancing French animation through Illumination's close production ties with its Paris-based studio.

== Filmography ==
=== Feature films ===
Year	Title	Notes
1986	Quicksilver	Associate producer
1989	Brothers in Arms	Producer
1990	Opportunity Knocks	Producer
1993	Fly by Night	Executive producer
1993	Swing Kids	Executive producer
1993	Cool Runnings	Executive producer
1993	Sister Act 2: Back in the Habit	Co-executive producer
1994	Trial by Jury	Producer
2002	Ice Age	Executive producer
2002	Gone Nutty	Executive producer
2005	Robots	Executive producer
2006	Ice Age: The Meltdown	Executive producer
2006	No Time for Nuts	Executive producer
2008	Horton Hears a Who!	Executive producer
2010	Despicable Me	Producer
2011	Hop	Producer
2012	The Lorax	Producer
2013	Despicable Me 2	Producer
2015	Minions	Producer
2016	The Secret Life of Pets	Producer
2016	Sing	Producer
2017	Despicable Me 3	Producer
2018	The Grinch	Producer
2019	The Secret Life of Pets 2	Producer
2021	Sing 2	Producer
2022	Minions: The Rise of Gru	Producer
2022	Puss in Boots: The Last Wish	Executive producer
2023	The Super Mario Bros. Movie	Producer
2023	Migration	Producer
2024	Despicable Me 4	Producer
2026	The Super Mario Galaxy Movie	Producer
2026	Minions & Monsters	Producer
2027	Not Alone	Producer
2027	Shrek 5	Producer
