= The Secret Life of Pets 2 =

2019 film by Chris Renaud

- Theatrical release poster
- Directed by: Chris Renaud
- Written by: Brian Lynch
- Produced by: Chris Meledandri; Janet Healy
- Starring: Patton Oswalt; Kevin Hart; Eric Stonestreet; Jenny Slate; Tiffany Haddish; Lake Bell; Nick Kroll; Dana Carvey; Ellie Kemper; Hannibal Buress; Bobby Moynihan; Harrison Ford
- Edited by: Tiffany Hillkurtz
- Music by: Alexandre Desplat
- Production companies: Universal Pictures; Illumination
- Distributed by: Universal Pictures
- Release dates: May 24, 2019 (United Kingdom); June 7, 2019 (United States)
- Running time: 86 minutes
- Country: United States
- Language: English
- Budget: $80 million
- Box office: $431.1 million

The Secret Life of Pets 2 is a 2019 American animated comedy film directed by Chris Renaud and written by Brian Lynch. Produced by Universal Pictures and Illumination, it is the second feature film in the Secret Life of Pets franchise and the sequel to The Secret Life of Pets (2016). The film features the voices of Patton Oswalt (replacing Louis C.K.), Kevin Hart, Eric Stonestreet, Jenny Slate, Tiffany Haddish, Lake Bell, Nick Kroll, Dana Carvey, Ellie Kemper, Hannibal Buress, Bobby Moynihan, and Harrison Ford.

The Secret Life of Pets 2 was theatrically released in the United States on June 7, 2019. It received mixed reviews from critics and grossed $431 million on an $80 million budget. A sequel is in development, with Renaud returning to direct.

== Plot ==
Three years after the events of the first film, Max and Duke's owner Katie has married a man named Chuck and had a son, Liam. Max's resentful, then overprotective, feelings for Liam develop into an itch that leads Katie to get him a humiliating dog cone from the veterinarian, but his luck changes when Duke reveals the family is going on a road trip.

Before Max leaves, he entrusts his favorite toy, Busy Bee, to his fiancé Gidget. However, Gidget loses Busy Bee in a cat-infested apartment owned by a cat lady, so she gets "cat lessons" from Chloe in order to sneak into the apartment. With the help of Norman, Gidget does so alone, but she unintentionally causes all of the apartment cats to hail her as their "queen" after a staged defeat of a “red dot”, thus allowing her to retrieve Busy Bee.

When Max, Duke, and their family reach a farm owned by Chuck's uncle, Max is unaccustomed to its way of life. Local Welsh Sheepdog Rooster tells him to get over his insecurities about Liam and ditches his dog cone. After Max tries and fails to emulate Rooster's herding skills, as well as an incident with a flock of sheep, Rooster enlists Max’s help to find Cotton, a lost lamb that ran away. Rooster's advice about overcoming fear helps Max improve his newfound bravery and rescue Cotton from a falling tree in a gorge, earning Rooster's respect.

Meanwhile, Snowball, who dreams of being a superhero, meets a Shih Tzu named Daisy, who explains that she needs help to rescue Hue, a white tiger being held captive by an abusive circus owner named Sergei. Daisy and Snowball sneak into the circus and evade Sergei's pack of wolves to free Hue. However, during the escape, Daisy loses her flower clip, which the wolves use to track her down.

Daisy and Snowball take Hue to Pops' apartment first; Pops reluctantly lets Hue stay, but after he makes a mess, he is relocated to Max and Duke's apartment the next day. That night, Duke and Max return from their road trip, while Sergei and his wolves track Daisy there and capture her along with Hue, fleeing on a train. Max helps Snowball and Norman chase down Sergei as they contact Gidget for assistance. Gidget, Max’s friends, and the cats trick the cat lady into driving in her own car, in pursuit of the train.

Upon reaching the train, Max is ambushed by the wolves, so he takes them out, and Snowball fights and fires Sergei's pet monkey out of a cannon while freeing Daisy. The monkey inadvertently knocks Max off the train; using his newfound bravery, he jumps back onto the train from the top of a tunnel, where he fights Sergei. The other pets free Hue and kick Sergei out of the train, but before they can escape, Sergei holds them at gunpoint and plans to kill them. However, Gidget and the cat lady run over and knock Sergei out with their car, and offer the animals a ride back home. Life resumes as normal, with Hue finding a new home with Chloe's owner, and Max letting go of his anxiety for Liam while sending him off to preschool.

== Voice cast ==
- Patton Oswalt as Max, a Jack Russell Terrier. He takes over for Louis C.K., who previously voiced the character in the first film. C.K. was originally planned to reprise his role as Max for the sequel, but after being accused of and later admitting to sexual misconduct with several women in November 2017, C.K. was dropped from the sequel and Oswalt was brought on to take over for C.K. in April 2018.
- Kevin Hart as Snowball, a white rabbit who is the former leader of the Flushed Pets and a would-be superhero
- Harrison Ford as Rooster, a Welsh Sheepdog and Max's mentor
- Tiffany Haddish as Daisy, a Shih Tzu
- Nick Kroll as Sergei, an abusive ringmaster
- Eric Stonestreet as Duke, a brown Newfoundland who lives with Max
- Jenny Slate as Gidget, a white Pomeranian dog
- Lake Bell as Chloe, a fat and apathetic gray tabby cat
- Dana Carvey as Pops, an elderly Basset Hound whose back legs are paralyzed
- Chris Renaud as Norman, a guinea pig
- Hannibal Buress as Buddy, a laid-back dachshund
- Bobby Moynihan as Mel, a hyperactive pug
- Ellie Kemper as Katie, Max and Duke's owner
- Pete Holmes as Chuck, Katie's husband
- Henry Lynch as Liam, Katie and Chuck's toddler son
- Sean Giambrone as Cotton, a young lamb who disappears from the farm, but Max is encouraged by Rooster to overcome his anxieties and save him from a cliff
- Meredith Salenger as a cat lady
- Michael Beattie as:
  - The lead wolf of Sergei's wolf pack
  - A skinny cat
- Kiely Renaud as Molly, Snowball's owner
- Tara Strong as:
  - Sweetpea, a budgie parakeet
  - Pickles, an English Bulldog who is one of Pops' students in puppy school
  - Baby Liam
  - Additional Voices
- Jessica DiCicco as:
  - Princess, a Poodle who is one of Pops' students in puppy school
  - Tiny, a young basset hound who is also one of Pops' students in puppy school
  - Additional Voices
- Garth Jennings as a hamster

== Production ==
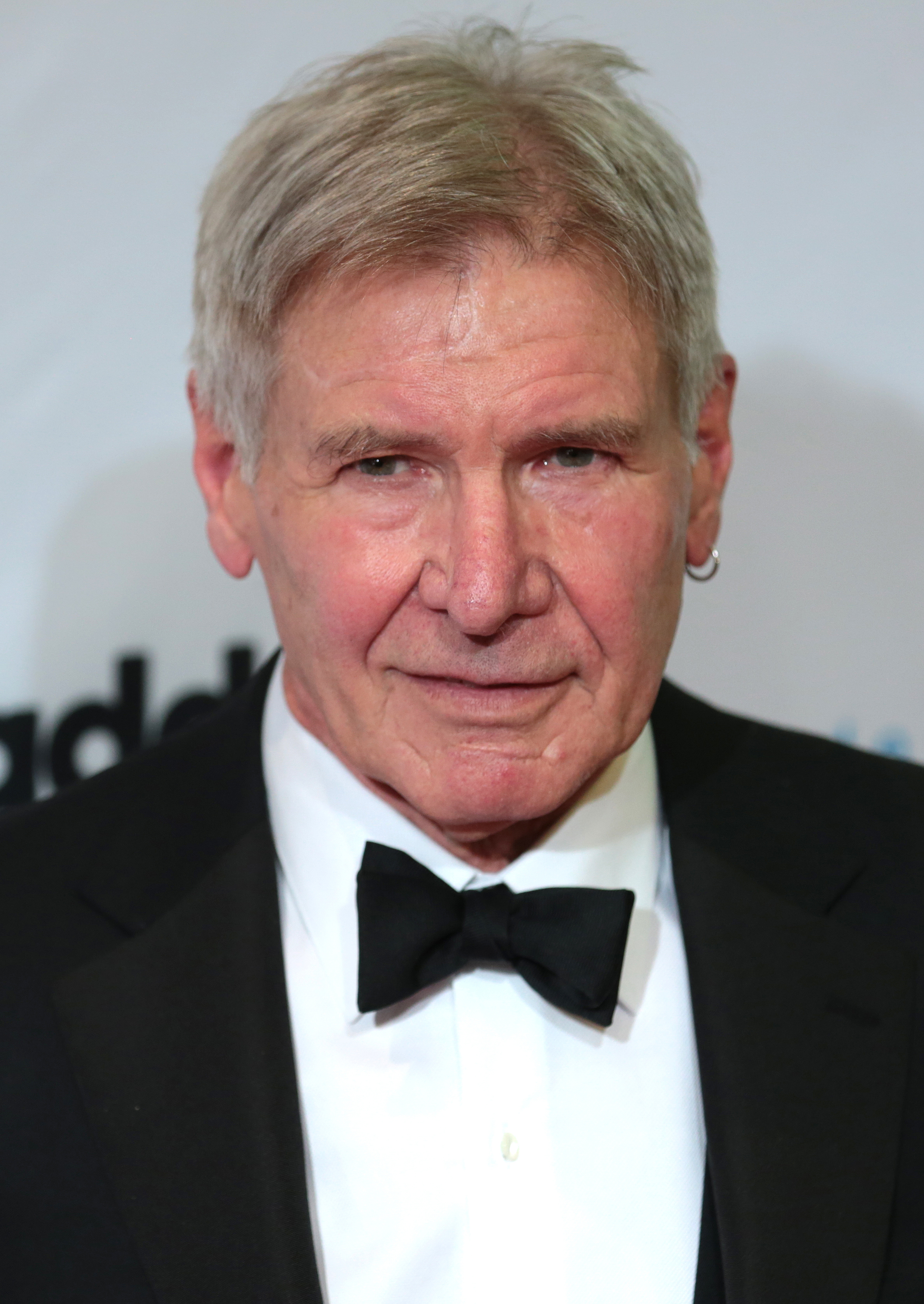
Harrison Ford joins the cast as the voice of Rooster.

Universal Pictures and Illumination Entertainment announced a sequel to the original The Secret Life of Pets in 2016 with director Chris Renaud and writer Brian Lynch returning, and Chris Meledandri and Janet Healy producing. The Oatmeal writer Matthew Inman worked on the film as a creative consultant.

=== Casting ===
Louis C.K. was originally planned to reprise his role as Max, but after being accused of and later admitting to sexual misconduct with several women in November 2017, C.K. was dropped from the sequel. Patton Oswalt took over for C.K. as Max the following year in April instead, while Jenny Slate, Kevin Hart, Eric Stonestreet, Ellie Kemper, Lake Bell, Dana Carvey, Tara Strong, Hannibal Buress, and Bobby Moynihan reprised their roles. Additional casting includes Tiffany Haddish, Nick Kroll, Harrison Ford and Pete Holmes.

== Music ==
Alexandre Desplat, who composed the score of the first film, returned for the sequel. The soundtrack was released by Back Lot Music on May 31, 2019, featuring cover versions of Bill Withers' "Lovely Day", Paul Simon's "Me and Julio Down by the Schoolyard" and Desiigner's "Panda". The songs were performed by LunchMoney Lewis, Aminé, Jack Antonoff and Kevin Hart.

== Release ==
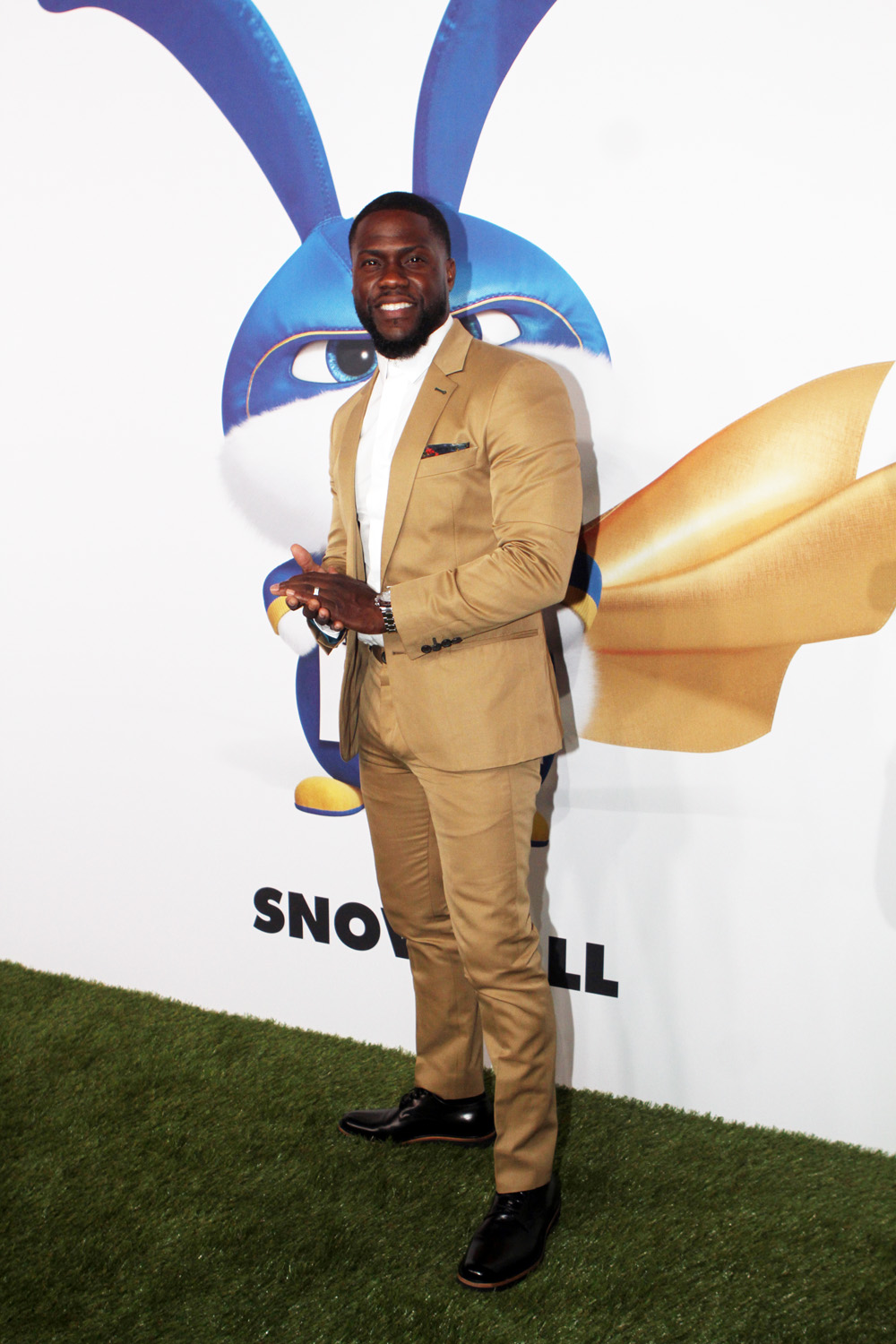
Kevin Hart at the film's premiere

The Secret Life of Pets 2 was released in the United States on June 7, 2019 by Universal Pictures. It was previously set for a July 13, 2018, release, and then to July 3, 2019. The film was released in the United Kingdom two weeks earlier on May 24.

=== Home media ===
The film was released on digital on August 13, 2019 by Universal Pictures Home Entertainment, with Ultra HD Blu-ray, Blu-ray and DVD releases following on August 27. It includes two mini-movies: Super Gidget, and Minion Scouts. The 4K Ultra HD version was also Universal's first release to use the HDR10+ format.

== Reception ==
=== Box office ===
The Secret Life of Pets 2 grossed $159 million in the United States and Canada, and $287.2 million in other territories, for a worldwide total of $446.2 million, against a production budget of $80 million. Deadline Hollywood calculated the net profit of the film to be $118 million, when factoring together all expenses and revenues.

In the United States and Canada, the film was released alongside Dark Phoenix and was initially projected to gross around $60 million in its opening weekend. The film played in 4,561 theaters, the second-widest release ever at the time. After making $17.4 million on its first day (including $2.2 million from Thursday night previews, down from the first film's $5.3 million), estimates were lowered to $46 million. It went on to debut to $46.7 million, less than half the opening of the first film, but still finishing first at the weekend box office. In its second weekend, the film made $24.4 million, finishing second behind newcomer Men in Black: International, and then made $10.3 million in its third weekend, finishing in fifth place.

In the United Kingdom, the film debuted to $4.1 million from 613 theaters on the May 24 weekend. A week later, the film expanded to Russia and added a combined $17.2 million from the two countries.

=== Critical response ===
On Rotten Tomatoes, the film holds an approval rating of 60% based on 164 reviews with an average rating of 5.8/10. The site's critical consensus reads: "The Secret Life of Pets 2 doesn't teach its animated stars any new narrative tricks -- but for fans of the original, this funny, energetic sequel should still satisfy." On Metacritic, the film has a weighted average score of 55 out of 100, based on 26 critics, indicating "mixed or average reviews". Audiences polled by CinemaScore gave the film an average grade of "A−" on an A+ to F scale, the same score as the first film, while those at PostTrak gave it an average 4.5 out of 5 stars.

Courtney Howard of Variety magazine wrote: "It's unusual for a typical Illumination broad comedy to include a heartrending message that makes parents feel less alone in their very real, visceral struggles. It's just cloaked in a shenanigans-soaked romp about what pets do when humans aren't looking." James Berardinelli gave the film 2.5 out of 4 stars but called the film "a perfect example of what can happen when a sequel exists simply because its predecessor made a lot of money". He called it "a disappointingly mediocre effort that doesn't have a lot to offer potential viewers over age 10" saying it was unfocused and "essentially three separate shorts connected only by the presence of returning characters".

Emily Davison of UK Film Review called it "a much more enjoyable outing" and said the "voice cast is also strong all around".

== Accolades ==
At the 47th Annie Awards, The Secret Life of Pets 2 received nominations for Outstanding Achievement for Voice Acting in a Feature Production (Slate) and Outstanding Achievement for Editorial in a Feature Production (Tiffany Hillkurtz). It was nominated in three categories at the 2021 Golden Trailer Awards: "Panda" (Inside Job) for Best Animation/Family TV Spot, "Rooftop" (Lindeman & Associates) for Best Animation/Family Movie Poster, and "Graffiti" (Lindeman & Associates) for Best Wildposts. The film, and the performances of Hart and Haddish, each received a Nickelodeon Kids' Choice Award and a People's Choice Award nomination.

== Sequel ==
In March 2022, in an interview on the podcast The Gary and Kenny Show, Meledandri stated that a third film is in development. In June 2026, Meledandri again confirmed in an interview that the third film is still in active development.
