= Yarrow Cheney =

American director (born 1973)

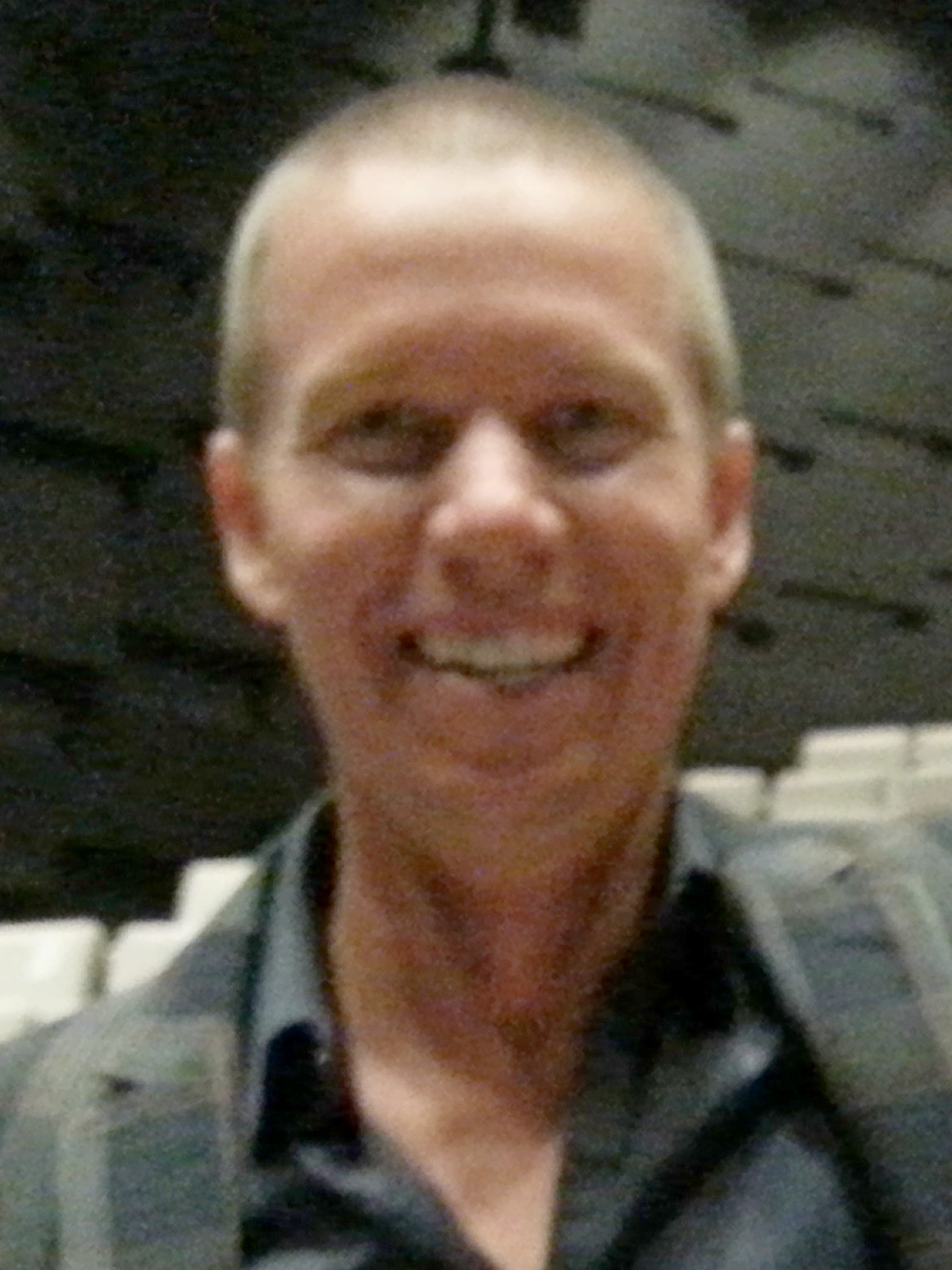
- Cheney in 2016
- Born: June 27, 1973 (age 53)
- Education: California Institute of the Arts
- Occupations: Director, artist, designer, author, illustrator, animator
- Years active: 1995–present
- Spouse: Carrie Cheney
- Website: www.yarrowcheney.com

Yarrow Cheney (born June 27, 1973) is an American director, artist, designer, author, illustrator and animator. He was a production designer in Despicable Me 2 (2013), The Lorax (2012), and Despicable Me (2010), for which he received Primetime Emmy and Annie Awards nominations.

In 2016, Cheney co-directed Illumination Entertainment's The Secret Life of Pets with Chris Renaud, that received positive reviews and became the sixth highest grossing-film of 2016. In 2018, he directed The Grinch with Scott Mosier.

His debut children's book, Superworld: Save Noah, the first in a middle-grade series written by his wife Carrie Cheney, was published on October 4, 2022. An animated film adaptation of the book series is in development by Paramount Animation and Temple Hill Entertainment.

== Early life ==
Cheney was born to Jack Cheney and Caryn Brady in 1973. He attended California Institute of the Arts from 1992 to 1995.

== Filmography ==
=== Animation ===
- The Iron Giant (1999): CGI animator
- Quest for Camelot (1998): Animator
- Cats Don't Dance (1997): Animator

=== Director ===
- The Grinch (2018) also character designer
- The Secret Life of Pets (co-director) (2016)
- Puppy (2013): Short, also writer
- The Very First Noel (2006) (re-released in 2020 as The Three Wise Men): Video Short, also editor, art director and producer

=== Production designer ===
- Despicable Me 2 (2013)
- The Lorax (2012)
- Despicable Me (2010)
- The Very First Noel (2006): Video short
- Curious George (2006)
- The ChubbChubbs! (2002): Short

=== Other ===
- Dilbert (1999): main title designer
- Mummies Alive! (1997): concept artist
- The Maxx (1995): TV Mini-Series, background layout artist, 7 episodes

== Awards and nominations ==
- 2014: Outstanding Achievement in Production Design in an Animated Feature Production - Despicable Me 2 (nom) (shared with Eric Guillon)
- 2013: Annie Award for Best Character Design in an Animated Feature Production -The Lorax (nom) (shared with Eric Guillon and Colin Stimpson)
- 2011: Annie Award for Best Production Design in an Animated Feature Production - Despicable Me (nom)
- 1999: Primetime Emmy Award for Outstanding Main Title Design - Dilbert (shared with Carrie Cheney)
