= The Secret Life of Pets (soundtrack) =

The Secret Life of Pets (Original Motion Picture Soundtrack)

Film score by Alexandre Desplat
- Released: July 1, 2016
- Recorded: 2016
- Studios: Capitol Recording Studios; Eastwood Scoring Stage
- Genres: Jazz; classical
- Length: 51:31
- Label: Back Lot Music
- Producer: Dominique Lemonnier

Alexandre Desplat chronology
Florence Foster Jenkins (2016)	The Secret Life of Pets (Original Motion Picture Soundtrack) (2016)	The Light Between Oceans (2016)

The Secret Life of Pets (Original Motion Picture Soundtrack) is the soundtrack album to the 2016 film of the same name. The film's music is scored by Alexandre Desplat and released on July 1, 2016 by Back Lot Music. The music consisted of jazz, classical and orchestral pieces, which Desplat described the musical style as "George Gershwin meets Miles Davis". The score received positive critical response.

The Japanese version has an exclusive song, "Brand New Tomorrow" by Ieiri Leo.

== Development ==
"An animation movie requires work on the sound and music which is more important than a live-action movie because it's non-existing persons...you have to create life! And music, in that sense, is very important," he explains. "There's also a lot of music, surely, and maybe sometimes much more than a drama or a comedy. And it's a very detailed type of work. Every single entry, every single move and motion of the characters, must go with music."

— Alexandre Desplat

In December 2015, Desplat was hired to score music for The Secret Life of Pets. In an interview to Entertainment Weekly, Desplat said that "[Director] Chris Renaud showed me some excerpts of the film and they were so funny and beautifully shot that I was already excited, and then we had a chat about music and very quickly we realized that we could go to a territory which I've not really explored in movies in America, which is jazz meeting orchestra. For taking place in New York, there was something that felt very right." Despite being a jazz-music lover, he did not find the right project for using jazz music, which he admitted: "I haven't really had an opportunity to really use it in a big scope for cinema, and this was a great option for me to do that. Swing, classical references, jazz, a symphony chorus, humor, tenderness...all these things were there, offered to me."

Initially, Desplat intended to use jazz music, but with the limitation of using only jazz, and wanting to explore several territories, such as melodies and adventurous themes, he decided to add an orchestral music. Desplat brought in an 85-piece orchestral and a 35-member vocal choir, for scoring the film. Desplat said, "At times the score is really full blast with a hundred and more musicians. There is a great electric energy coming from the musicians."

Desplat approached a light-hearted tone for the film, which was felt right, according to Renaud. The notes from the first theme were played on clarinet, by virtuoso Dan Higgins. Desplat said that "This instrument comes back quite often playing the same melody. There is a lightness to it. It's cheeky". When the film transitioned from a fun into moments of danger, sadness and melancholy, Desplat said that the score was a "challenge" and attributed "That's difficult when you are in a genre film where you have been bouncing with very jaunty music all the way [...] How do you end a film without being too sad? This melancholy that you have to find that is not too melancholy. Without being sentimental, but still being moving."

== Release ==
Entertainment Weekly released the track "Meet the Pets" exclusively from the film, on June 23, 2016. The soundtrack was initially set to be released along with the film, on July 8, but was instead released a week earlier, by Back Lot Music. On October 14, 2016, Desplat conducted the live concert performance of the film's premiere, held at the Hollywood in Vienna annual music gala, in Vienna Concert Hall, Austria, where he would also receive the Max Steiner Film Music Achievement Award.

== Reception ==
Professional ratings
Review scores
Source	Rating
AllMusic	link

Jonathan Broxton of Movie Music UK wrote "To get anything out of The Secret Life of Pets you have to have a high tolerance for jazz, a liking for certain world music rhythms, and not be put off by numerous blatant homages to other composers, irrespective of how well they filter through Desplat's own musical sensibility. You also have to be prepared to experience rapid changes in tone, style, orchestration, and pacing, sometimes all within the same cue. Switches from light comedy to romance to full on action and back again are frequent, and unapologetic, and if that sort of emotional musical schizophrenia bothers you, you might want to take a sedative before hitting the play button." James Southall of Movie Wave opined "with all this great stuff, you'd think it would make a great album, but it doesn't – not really. It's too bitty, if anything there's just too much going on, not enough time to savour any of it. It's entertaining enough with some really nice highlights, technically it's beyond reproach, and it probably works wonders within the film."

Marcy Donelson of Allmusic wrote "Desplat's musical agility is on full display. Though nearly all of the recording is original score (pop music from the film is not included here), the film and soundtrack close with a cover of "We Go Together" from the musical Grease, performed by workers at a sausage factory that appears earlier in the film." The Denver Post critic called the score as "outstanding", while Screen International-based Wendy Ide called the score as "jaunty" and "keeps up the pace". Jordan Mintzer of The Hollywood Reporter praised the score and attributed that "it takes notes from Breakfast at Tiffany's and other classic Manhattan-set movies, offering up a playful accompaniment to what ultimately feels like a smart but overindulgent exercise in computer-generated puppy love."

== Track listing ==
All music is composed by Alexandre Desplat, except where noted.

No.	Title	Artist(s)	Length
1.	"Meet the Pets"		2:37
2.	"Katie's Leaving"		0:55
3.	"Meet Duke"		3:36
4.	"Fetch Me a Stick"		3:09
5.	"Telenovela Squirrels"		1:24
6.	"Hijack!"		2:00
7.	"Gidget Meets Tiberius"		4:56
8.	"Initiation Time"		1:01
9.	"Rooftop Route"		1:27
10.	"The Viper"		1:49
11.	"You Have an Owner?"		3:04
12.	"Good Morning Max"		1:21
13.	"Sewer Chase"		1:09
14.	"Who's With Me?"		1:21
15.	"Me Like What Me See"		0:54
16.	"Traveling Bossa"		1:56
17.	"Flushed Out To Brooklyn"		2:47
18.	"Sausages!"		1:13
19.	"Duke's Old House / Captured"		3:03
20.	"Brooklyn Bridge Showdown"		2:34
21.	"Rescuing Duke"		2:46
22.	"Wet But Handsome / Blue Taxi"		1:24
23.	"Max and Gidget"		1:36
24.	"Welcome Home"		1:57
25.	"We Go Together" (originally from Grease)	The Sausage Factory Singers	1:24
Total length:			51:31

The theme song for the Japanese version of the film is "Brand New Tomorrow" by Leo Ieiri.

The opening scene features the Taylor Swift song "Welcome to New York" from her 2014 album 1989.

== Personnel ==
Credits adapted from CD liner notes

Production

- Producer – Dominique Lemonnier
- Programmer – Romain Allender
- Recording – Vincent Cirilli, Joel Iwataki
- Mixing – Joel Iwataki, Al Schmitt, Frank Wolf
- Editing – Kenneth Karman, Nevin Seus
- Music supervisor – Rachel Levy
- Technician – Jay Duerr
- Scoring crew – Charlie Paakkari, Dave Martinez, Nick Rives, Paula Salvatore, Jamie Olvera, Richard Wheeler Jr, Ryan Robinson, Tom Hardisty

Orchestra

- Orchestra contractor – Peter Rotter
- Orchestra conductor – Alexandre Desplat
- Choir conductor and contractor – Jasper Randall
- Concertmaster – Tereza Stanislav
- Orchestrator – Alexandre Desplat, Conrad Pope, Jean-Pascal Beintus, Mark Graham

Instrumentation

- Bassoon – Damian Montano, Judith Farmer, Kenneth Munday, Samantha Crockett, Rose Corrigan
- Cello – Armen Ksajikian, Cecilia Tsan, Dennis Karmazyn, Eric Byers, Jacob Braun, Paula Hochhalter, Simone Vitucci, Steve Erdody, Timothy Landauer, Trevor Handy, Vanessa Freebairn-Smith, Andrew Shulman
- Clarinet – Stuart Clark, Daniel Higgins
- Drums – Peter Erskine
- Contrabass – Bruce Morgenthaler, Christian Kollgaard, Drew Dembowski, Edward Meares, Geoffrey Osika, Nico Abondolo, Oscar Hidalgo, Stephen Dress, Michael Valerio
- Flute – Alexandre Desplat, Heather Clark, Jennifer Olson, Julie Burkert, Stephen Kujala, Geri Rotella
- Guitar – Dori Caymmi, Timothy May, Andrew Synowiec
- Harp – Marcia Dickstein
- Horn – Benjamin Jaber, David Everson, Dylan Hart, Laura Brenes, Steve Becknell, Teag Reaves, Mark Adams
- Oboe – Chris Bleth, Jessica Pearlman
- Percussion – Alan Estes, Donald Williams, Edward Atkatz, Judith Chilnick, Steven Schaeffer, Wade Culbreath, Gregory Goodall, Paulinho Da Costa, Alex Neciosup-Acuna
- Piano – Alan Steinberger, Thomas Ranier, Randy Kerber
- Saxophone – Brian Scanlon, Jay Mason, Jeff Driskill, Salvadore Lozano, Daniel Higgins
- Trombone – Andrew Martin, William Reichenbach, Phillip Keen, Alexander Iles
- Trumpet – Barry Perkins, Robert Schaer, Jon Lewis
- Tuba – Doug Tornquist
- Vibraphone – Wade Culbreath
- Viola – Alma Fernandez, Darrin McCann, David Walther, Lynne Richburg, Maria Newman, Matthew Funes, Michael Nowak, Robert Brophy, Shawn Mann, Thomas Diener, Victoria Miskolczy, Brian Dembow
- Violin – Alyssa Park, Amy Hershberger, Andrew Bulbrook, Benjamin Powell, Bruce Dukov, Charlie Bisharat, Clayton Haslop, Darius Campo, Dimitrie Leivici, Eun-Mee Ahn, Helen Nightengale, Henry Gronnier, Irina Voloshina, Jacqueline Brand, Jay Rosen, Jessica Guideri, Josefina Vergara, Katia Popov, Kevin Connolly, Lisa Liu, Lisa Sutton, Lorenz Gamma, Maya Magub, Miwako Watanabe, Natalie Leggett, Phillip Levy, Rafael Rishik, Rebecca Bunnell, Roberto Cani, Roger Wilkie, Sarah Thornblade, Serena McKinney, Shalini Vijayan, Tamara Hatwan, Julie Gigante

Jazz band

- Bass – Mike Valerio
- Trombone – Andrew Martin, Charlie Morillas, Craig Gosnell, Francisco Torres
- Trumpet – Dan Fornero, Bijon Watson, John Fumo, Kye Palmer, Rob Schaer

Vocalists

- Baritone Vocals – Abdiel Gonzalez, David Loucks, Eric Bradley, Jim Campbell, Mark Edward Smith, Scott T. Graff, Scott Lehmkuhl, Stephen Grimm
- Bass Vocals – Dylan Gentile, Gregory Geiger, Mark Stephen Beasom, Michael T. Geiger, Randy Crenshaw, Reid Bruton, Steven Pence, William Kenneth Goldman
- Tenor Vocals – Gerald White, Joseph Golightly, Jon Lee Keenan, Matt Brown, Michael Lichtenauer, Shawn Kirchner, Tim Gonzales

Marketing and management

- Music business affairs – Kyle Staggs, Tanya Perara
- Executive in charge of music – Mike Knobloch
- Marketing – Nikki Walsh
- Production director – Jake Voulgarides
- Music librarian – Joe Zimmerman, Mark Graham
- Packaging design – Brian Porizek
- Executive producer – Chris Meledandri

== Accolades ==
List of awards and nominations
Award	Date of ceremony	Category	Recipients	Result	Ref.
Annie Awards	February 4, 2017	Outstanding Achievement, Music in an Animated Feature Production	Alexandre Desplat	Nominated	
Hollywood Music in Media Awards	November 17, 2016	Best Original Score – Animated Film	Alexandre Desplat	Won	
International Film Music Critics Association	February 21, 2017	Best Original Score for a Comedy Film	Alexandre Desplat	Nominated	
