= Despicable Me (film) =

2010 American animated film

- Theatrical release poster
- Directed by: Chris Renaud; Pierre Coffin
- Screenplay by: Cinco Paul; Ken Daurio
- Story by: Sergio Pablos
- Produced by: Chris Meledandri; Janet Healy; John Cohen
- Starring: Steve Carell; Jason Segel; Russell Brand; Kristen Wiig; Miranda Cosgrove; Will Arnett; Julie Andrews
- Edited by: Pamela Ziegenhagen-Shefland; Gregory Perler
- Music by: Pharrell Williams; Heitor Pereira
- Production companies: Universal Pictures; Illumination Entertainment
- Distributed by: Universal Pictures
- Release dates: June 9, 2010 (Annecy); July 9, 2010 (United States)
- Running time: 94 minutes
- Country: United States
- Language: English
- Budget: $69 million
- Box office: $544.2 million

Despicable Me is a 2010 American animated comedy film directed by Chris Renaud and Pierre Coffin and written by Cinco Paul and Ken Daurio. The first feature film produced by Illumination Entertainment, it features the voices of Steve Carell, Jason Segel, Russell Brand, Kristen Wiig, Miranda Cosgrove, Will Arnett, and Julie Andrews. The story follows Gru, a longtime supervillain who adopts three orphan girls to use as pawns in a sinister scheme, but reluctantly develops an emotional attachment to them.

Development of Despicable Me began when writer Sergio Pablos pitched the idea about a main character having villainous attributes to producer Chris Meledandri following Illumination's foundation in 2007. The film was announced in 2008, with much of its creative team attached. Animation was provided by Paris-based studio Mac Guff. Pharrell Williams and Heitor Pereira composed the film's score, with original songs written and performed by the former.

Despicable Me debuted at the Annecy International Animated Film Festival on June 9, 2010, and was theatrically released in the United States on July 9 by Universal Pictures. It was a critical and commercial success, grossing $544.2 million and becoming the ninth-highest-grossing film of 2010. It was nominated for Best Animated Feature Film at the Golden Globe Awards, BAFTA Awards and Annie Awards, and won Favorite Animated Movie at the 2011 Kids' Choice Awards. Despicable Me began a media franchise which includes six succeeding films, beginning with Despicable Me 2 in 2013.

== Plot ==
Felonious Gru, a longtime supervillain, has his pride hurt when an unidentified rival steals the Great Pyramid of Giza. Gru, his elderly assistant Dr. Nefario, and his army of Minions devise a plan to steal the Moon, which would make Gru the best criminal of the century. Seeking financial assistance, Gru visits Mr. Perkins, the president of the Bank of Evil, who orders Gru to first procure a shrink ray that he would use to shrink the moon. Gru and two Minions obtain the shrink ray from a research base in East Asia, only for Vector—the budding villain who was responsible for the Egyptian Pyramid heist—to ambush them and steal it for himself.

After numerous failed attempts to infiltrate Vector's fortress, Gru notices three orphaned girls—Margo, Edith, and Agnes—being allowed in to sell cookies to Vector, giving him an idea on how to steal the ray. Gru adopts the girls using a dentist persona and has them distract Vector while he reclaims the shrink ray. Afterwards, he tries to abandon the girls at an amusement park but ends up bonding with them. Back at home, Gru shows Perkins the shrink ray through a video call, only to be rejected for the loan on the grounds he is no longer considered a prime villain. Observing Gru's despair, the girls offer him their piggy bank, and the Minions pool their resources to fund the moon heist.

Nefario calculates the day when the Moon is closest to Earth, which coincides with the girls' upcoming ballet recital. Believing the girls are too much of a distraction to Gru, Nefario has the orphanage's owner Miss Hattie take the girls back. Meanwhile, Perkins informs Vector, who is revealed to be Perkins' son, of Gru's current possession of the shrink ray. The next day, after successfully shrinking and stealing the Moon, Gru rushes back to Earth in hopes of making it to the recital on time, only to find that he had missed it and that Vector has kidnapped the girls.

Gru confronts Vector at his fortress, surrendering the Moon in exchange for the girls, but Vector refuses to release them. Enraged, Gru storms the fortress, and Vector activates his escape aircraft. Meanwhile, Nefario and the Minions discover that the shrink ray's effects are temporary; the bigger an object, the faster it reverts to its original size. Gru, Nefario, and the Minions rescue the girls just as the Moon returns to its normal size and launches itself back into orbit, destroying Vector's aircraft and leaving him stranded. Gru, being praised as a hero for returning the moon, regains custody of the girls, and they celebrate with a special ballet recital that becomes a dance party.

== Voice cast ==
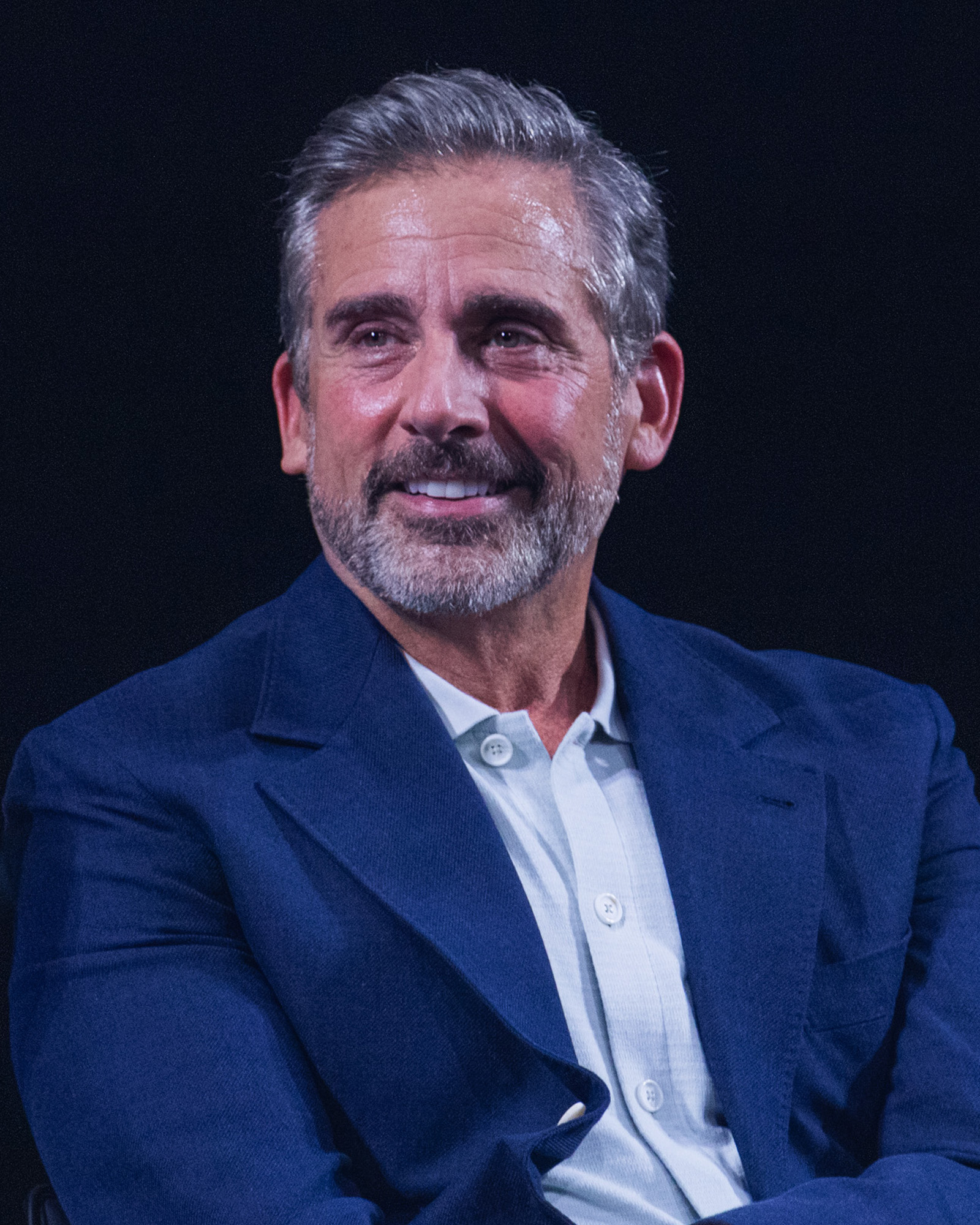
Steve Carell (pictured in 2025) voices Gru.

- Steve Carell as Gru, a longtime supervillain
- Miranda Cosgrove as Margo, a preteen orphaned girl and one of Gru's adopted daughters
- Russell Brand as Dr. Nefario, Gru's elderly assistant and best friend
- Jason Segel as Vector, an arch-rival of Gru who was responsible for the Great Pyramid of Giza heist
- Will Arnett as Mr. Perkins, the president of the Bank of Evil
- Kristen Wiig as Miss Hattie, the orphanage's owner
- Julie Andrews as Marlena, Gru's mother

Despicable Me's supporting voice cast includes Dana Gaier and Elsie Fisher as Gru's adopted daughters Edith and Agnes, respectively; and Pierre Coffin as the Minions, Gru's humorous henchmen, with Chris Renaud as Dave and Jemaine Clement as Jerry. Other actors who lent their voices in minor roles include Danny McBride as Gru's neighbor Fred McDade, Jack McBrayer as a carnival barker and a tourist dad, Mindy Kaling as a tourist mom, Rob Huebel as an anchorman, Ken Daurio as an Egyptian guard, and Ken Jeong as a talk-show host.

== Production ==
=== Development and writing ===
To develop Despicable Me (under the working title Evil Me), Spanish animator and writer Sergio Pablos pitched the idea about a main character having villainous attributes. Pablos brought his pitch to producer Chris Meledandri, who founded his animation studio Illumination Entertainment after leaving 20th Century Fox Animation in early 2007; screenwriters Cinco Paul and Ken Daurio began writing the script. Afterward, Meledandri brought together Pierre Coffin and Chris Renaud to direct the project. Coffin, who had previously worked with Mac Guff, was recruited for his experience directing commercials for the studio, while Renaud was brought in for his animation experience in Blue Sky Studios. In November 2008, Illumination announced the beginning of development on its first computer animated film and project, Despicable Me, with Steve Carell in the lead voice role.

After being upset at recognizing Gru's behavior early in the production, which could become stale with audiences, Meledandri ordered the directors to lighten Despicable Me's tone. Carell reasoned this was because it could ruin the emotional weight between Gru and the three orphan girls. He suggested that the character "displayed a sharp edge". In response, two scenes were written: Gru popping a balloon and freezing customers. The language spoken by the Minions was invented by Coffin and Renaud; it is sometimes nicknamed "Minionese".

=== Animation and design ===
To save costs, the CGI animation and visual effects were handled by the Paris-based studio Mac Guff, with only 100 artists. Coffin, Renaud, and character designer Eric Guillon were responsible for creating the Minions. They did not exist in the original script until their addition during Despicable Me's production. Initial designs for the Minions were humans and robots, before finalizing their appearances to small, yellow pill-shaped creatures. Renaud described the Minions as out of focus and "not very smart". The characters took inspiration from Oompa-Loompas in Willy Wonka & the Chocolate Factory (1971) and Jawas in the Star Wars franchise, as well as silent screen stars Buster Keaton and Charlie Chaplin, and Warner Bros. cartoon characters, including Bugs Bunny.

== Music ==
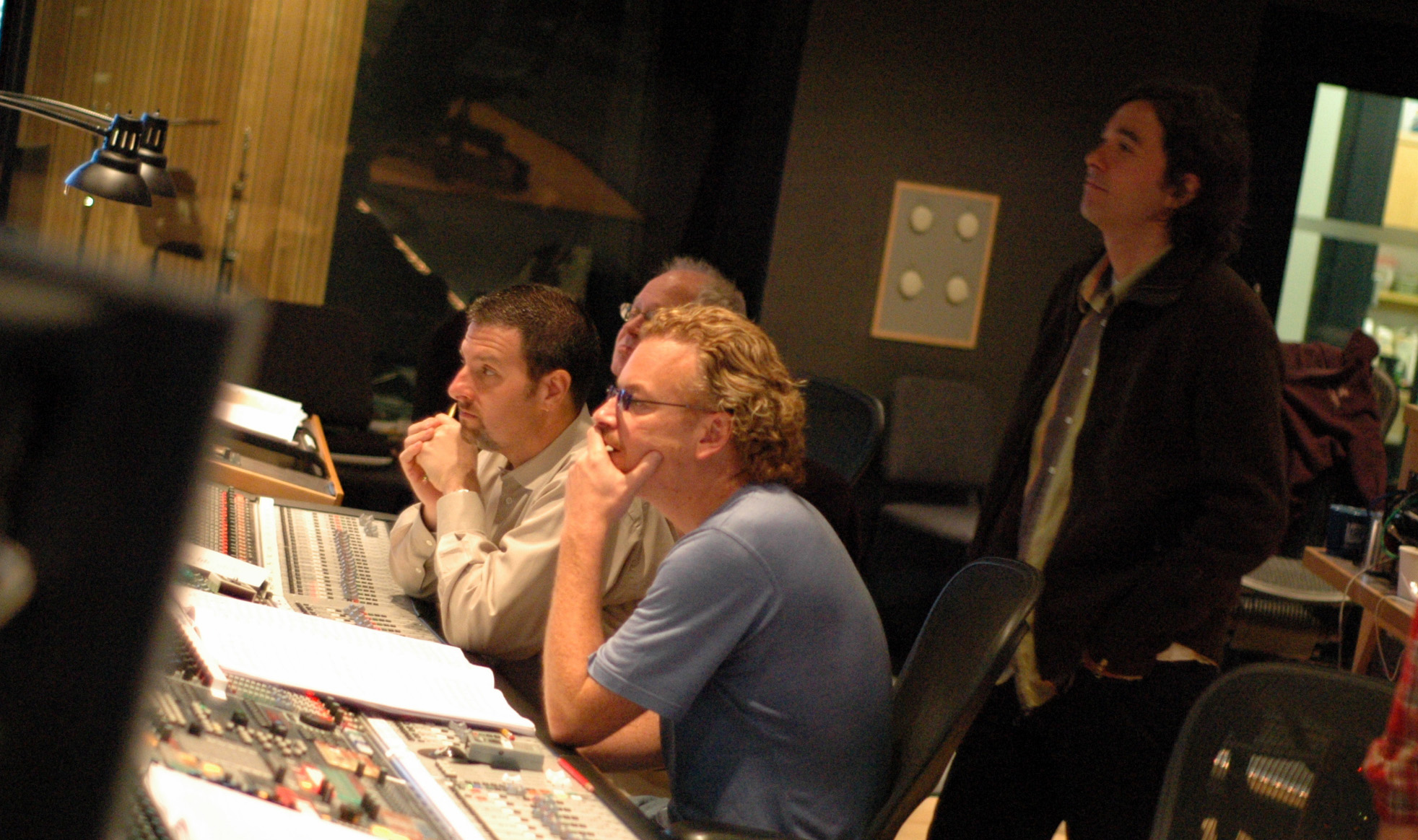
Composer Heitor Pereira (right) at the recording of the film's score

Despicable Me: Original Motion Picture Soundtrack was released on July 6, 2010. It features new songs from the film written and performed by Pharrell Williams and performances by Destinee & Paris, the Sylvers, Robin Thicke, and the Bee Gees.

== Marketing and release ==
Universal Pictures collaborated the film with licensing and promotional partners valued at $75 million for the marketing campaign. Additional marketing partners for the film included Airheads, Church's Chicken, Hungry Jack's, Color Me Mine, American Express, Kodak, IHOP, and Best Buy. As a promotional tie-in, Despicable Me: The Game was released in various platforms.

Despicable Me debuted at the Annecy International Animated Film Festival on June 9, 2010, followed by a premiere on June 27, at the Nokia Theatre in Los Angeles. The film was released in the United States on July 9 with Predators.

Universal Pictures Home Entertainment released Despicable Me on Blu-ray, Blu-ray 3D, and DVD on December 14, 2010. Physical copies contain behind-the-scenes featurettes; filmmaker commentaries; games; and short films Home Makeover, Orientation Day, and Banana. (Note: The short films were released on DVD as a separate disc titled Despicable Me Presents Minion Madness.) A 4K Ultra HD Blu-ray version was released in 2017.

== Reception ==
=== Box office ===
Despicable Me earned $251.7 million in the United States and Canada and $292.5 million in other territories, for a worldwide total of $544.2 million. It was the ninth-highest-grossing film of 2010.

In the United States and Canada, Despicable Me was released with Predators on July 9, 2010. During its opening weekend, the film earned $60.1 million across 3,476 theaters. Its second weekend earnings dropped by 42 percent to $32.7 million, and followed by another $24.1 million on the third weekend. Despicable Me left theaters by January 20, 2011, making it the seventh-highest-grossing film of 2010.

=== Critical response ===
On the review aggregator website Rotten Tomatoes, the film holds an approval rating of 80% based on 200 reviews, with an average rating of 6.8/10. The site's critics consensus reads, "Borrowing heavily (and intelligently) from Pixar and Looney Tunes, Despicable Me is a surprisingly thoughtful, family-friendly treat with a few surprises of its own". Metacritic, which uses a weighted average, assigned the film a score of 72 out of 100 based on 35 critics, indicating "generally favorable" reviews. Audiences polled by CinemaScore gave the film an average grade of "A" on an A+ to F scale.

Peter Travers of Rolling Stone gave the film three stars out of four, saying the directors were skilled at "springing surprises" from the writers' "ingenious" screenplay. Peter Debruge of Variety wrote, "Since villains so often steal the show in animation, Despicable Me smartly turns the whole operation over to megalomaniacal rogue Gru". Robert Wilonsky of The Village Voice wrote, "The result is pleasant and diverting, if ultimately forgettable, and it's one of the rare instances in the recent history of 3-D's resurrection as The Savior of Cinema in which the technology doesn't dim the screen or distract the focus". Christy Lemire of the Associated Press wrote, "Kids will dig it, adults will smile with amusement, and no one will be any different afterward than they were walking into the theater". Bill Goodykoontz of The Arizona Republic gave the film three and a half stars out of five, saying, "Neither as rich in story nor stunning in animation as Pixar offerings, Despicable Me instead settles for simply being goofy good fun, and it hardly seems like settling at all".

Carrie Rickey of The Philadelphia Inquirer gave the film two and a half stars out of four, saying, "Short, sweet-and-sour, and amusing rather than funny, Despicable Me can't help but be likable". Colin Covert of the Star Tribune gave the film two and a half stars out of four, saying "You'll probably leave the theater smiling, but don't expect to be emotionally engaged, Pixar-style. You'll be tickled, not touched". Claudia Puig of USA Today gave the film three stars out of four, saying, "A whip-smart family movie that makes inventive use of the summer's ubiquitous 3-D technology is something worth cheering". Tom Keogh of The Seattle Times gave the film three stars out of four, saying "Despicable Me appeals both to our innocence and our glee over cartoon anarchy". Ty Burr of The Boston Globe gave the film three stars out of four, saying, "Despicable Me has enough visual novelty and high spirits to keep the kiddies diverted and just enough wit to placate the parents". Roger Ebert gave the film three stars out of four, saying, "The film is funny, energetic, teeth-gnashingly venomous and animated with an eye to exploiting the 3-D process with such sure-fire techniques as a visit to an amusement park". Michael Phillips of the Chicago Tribune gave the film two and a half stars out of four, saying, "By taking the "heart" part just seriously enough, and in the nick of time, the movie saves itself from itself".

Kim Newman of Empire gave the film three stars out of five, saying, "It's no first-rank CGI cartoon, but shows how Pixar's quality over crass is inspiring the mid-list. Fun, with teary bits, for kids fresh and smart for adults". Kenneth Turan of the Los Angeles Times gave the film two and a half stars out of four, saying, "The film throws so much ersatz cleverness and overdone emotion at the audience that we end up more worn out than entertained". Stephen Whitty of the Newark Star-Ledger gave the film two and a half stars out of four, saying, "Unfortunately Despicable Me is just, predictably eh. And the one thing the larcenous Gru never steals is our heart". Ann Hornaday of The Washington Post gave the film three stars out of four, saying, "An improbably heartwarming, not to mention visually delightful, diversion". Rick Groen of The Globe and Mail gave the film four stars out of four, saying, "This animated thing pretty near out-Pixars Pixar". Mick LaSalle of the San Francisco Chronicle gave the film two stars out of four, saying, "When compared with the ambition and achievement of recent animated films, such as Coraline and Toy Story 3, Despicable Me hardly seems to have been worth making, and it's barely worth watching".

Bob Mondello of NPR gave the film an eight out of ten, saying, "It's all thoroughly adorable, and with an overlay that's nearly as odd as Carell's accent: Despicable Me looks a lot like other computer-animated pictures". A. O. Scott of The New York Times gave the film two stars out of five, saying, "So much is going on in this movie that, while there's nothing worth despising, there's not much to remember either". Kirk Honeycutt of The Hollywood Reporter wrote, "Despicable doesn't measure up to Pixar at its best. Nonetheless, it's funny, clever and warmly animated with memorable characters". Steve Persall of the Tampa Bay Times gave the film a B, saying, "Directors Pierre Coffin and Chris Renaud craft a fun stretch run, wrapping the story with warm, fuzzy funnies and nothing to suggest a sequel, which is probably wise". Tasha Robinson of The A.V. Club gave the film a B, saying, "Until the creep + orphans = happy family formula starts demanding abrupt, unconvincing character mutations, Despicable Me is a giddy joy".

In July 2019, the film was ranked 18th in a Rotten Tomatoes list of "38 Moon Movies to Celebrate the Moon Landing".

== Accolades ==
Accolades received by Despicable Me (film)
Award	Date of ceremony	Category	Recipient(s)	Result	Ref.
Alliance of Women Film Journalists Awards	December 24, 2010	Best Animated Feature	Despicable Me	Nominated	
Alliance of Women Film Journalists Awards	December 24, 2010	Best Animated Female	Miranda Cosgrove, Dana Gaier, and Elsie Fisher	Nominated	
American Cinema Editors Awards	February 19, 2011	Best Edited Animated Feature Film	Gregory Perler and Pamela Ziegenhagen-Shefland	Nominated	
Annie Awards	February 5, 2011	Best Animated Feature	Despicable Me	Nominated	
Annie Awards	February 5, 2011	Outstanding Achievement for Character Design in a Feature Production	Carter Goodrich	Nominated	
Annie Awards	February 5, 2011	Outstanding Achievement for Directing in a Feature Production	Pierre Coffin	Nominated	
Annie Awards	February 5, 2011	Outstanding Achievement for Music in a Feature Production	Pharrell Williams and Heitor Pereira	Nominated	
Annie Awards	February 5, 2011	Outstanding Achievement for Production Design in an Animated Feature Production	Yarrow Cheney and Eric Guillon	Nominated	
Annie Awards	February 5, 2011	Outstanding Achievement for Voice Acting in an Animated Feature Production	Steve Carell	Nominated	
ASCAP Awards	June 23, 2011	Top Box Office Films	Heitor Pereira and Pharrell Williams	Won	
British Academy Children's Awards	November 27, 2011	Kid's Vote — Film	Despicable Me	Nominated	
British Academy Film Awards	February 13, 2011	Best Animated Film	Chris Renaud and Pierre Coffin	Nominated	
Chicago Film Critics Association Awards	December 20, 2010	Best Animated Film	Despicable Me	Nominated	
The Comedy Awards	March 26, 2011	Best Animated Comedy Movie	Despicable Me	Nominated	
Critics' Choice Movie Awards	January 14, 2011	Best Animated Feature	Despicable Me	Nominated	
Golden Globe Awards	January 16, 2011	Best Animated Feature Film	Despicable Me	Nominated	
Golden Reel Awards	February 20, 2011	Outstanding Achievement in Sound Editing – Sound Effects, Foley, Dialogue and ADR for Animated Feature Film	Despicable Me	Nominated	
Golden Trailer Awards	June 10, 2010	Best Summer 2010 Blockbuster Poster	"Teaser One Sheet" (Ignition)	Nominated	
Houston Film Critics Society Awards	December 18, 2010	Best Animated Film	Despicable Me	Nominated	
ICG Publicists Awards	February 25, 2011	Maxwell Weinberg Publicists Showmanship Motion Picture Award	Despicable Me	Nominated	
Movieguide Awards	February 18, 2011	Best Movies for Families	Despicable Me	Nominated	
National Movie Awards	May 10, 2011	Best Animation	Despicable Me	Nominated	
Nebula Awards	May 21, 2011	Ray Bradbury Nebula Award for Outstanding Dramatic Presentation	Chris Renaud, Pierre Coffin, Cinco Paul, Ken Daurio, and Sergio Pablos	Nominated	
Nickelodeon Kids' Choice Awards	April 2, 2011	Favorite Animated Movie	Despicable Me	Won	
Nickelodeon Kids' Choice Awards	April 2, 2011	Favorite Buttkicker	Steve Carell	Nominated	
Online Film Critics Society Awards	January 3, 2011	Best Animated Film	Despicable Me	Nominated	
People's Choice Awards	January 5, 2011	Favorite Family Movie	Despicable Me	Nominated	
Producers Guild of America Awards	January 22, 2011	Best Animated Motion Picture	John Cohen, Janet Healy, and Chris Meledandri	Nominated	
San Diego Film Critics Society Awards	December 14, 2010	Best Animated Feature	Despicable Me	Nominated	
Satellite Awards	December 19, 2010	Best Animated or Mixed Media Feature	Despicable Me	Nominated	
Saturn Awards	June 23, 2011	Best Animated Film	Despicable Me	Nominated	
St. Louis Film Critics Association Awards	December 20, 2010	Best Animated Feature	Despicable Me	Nominated	
Teen Choice Awards	August 8, 2010	Choice Summer Movie	Despicable Me	Nominated	
Toronto Film Critics Association Awards	December 14, 2010	Best Animated Film	Despicable Me	Runner-up (Note: Shared with Toy Story 3 (2010))	
Washington D.C. Area Film Critics Association Awards	December 6, 2010	Best Animated Feature	Despicable Me	Nominated	
Women Film Critics Circle Awards	December 23, 2010	Best Animated Females	Despicable Me	Won	

== Legacy ==
Despicable Me's popularity grew following its release, which led to a successful multimedia franchise. The Minions, whose popularity was gradually increased since the film's release, became Illumination's mascots. Despicable Me inspired various Internet memes, including "Gorl" in reference to how Gru pronounces the word girl with his accent and "Gru's Plan", which is based on the film scene where Gru's presentation of his plan to steal the moon is interrupted when he finds a drawing of him sitting on the toilet in the presentation pages. It also helped launch the career of Elsie Fisher (voice of Agnes).

== Sequels and prequels ==
The unexpected financial success of Despicable Me led to the development on a sequel, with the intention of capitalizing on the original's popularity through an extensive marketing campaign. Despicable Me 2 (2013) surpassed the box-office take of Despicable Me, and received a similarly positive critical and audience response. The series has been expanded with three spin-off prequels–Minions (2015), Minions: The Rise of Gru (2022), and Minions & Monsters (2026)–and two further sequels–Despicable Me 3 (2017) and Despicable Me 4 (2024).

== Works cited ==
- Croll, Ben (July 12, 2022). The Art of Eric Guillon: From the Making of Despicable Me to Minions, The Secret Life of Pets, and More. San Rafael, California: Insight Editions. ISBN 9781683836810.
