= Illumination (company) =

American computer animation studio

- Logo used since 2017
- Formerly: Illumination Entertainment (2007–17)
- Type: Division
- Industry: Animation; Motion pictures; Television specials
- Founded: January 17, 2007; 19 years ago
- Founder: Chris Meledandri
- Headquarters: 2105 Colorado Ave, Santa Monica, California, United States
- Key people: Chris Meledandri (CEO); Keith Feldman (COO)
- Number of employees: 850+ (2016)
- Parent: Universal Pictures
- Divisions: Illumination Labs; Illumination Studios Paris
- Website: www.illumination.com

Illumination, formerly known as Illumination Entertainment, stylized in all caps, is an American animation studio founded by producer Chris Meledandri in 2007. It has an "exclusive financing and distribution partnership" with Universal Pictures (which itself is a division of Comcast through the Universal Filmed Entertainment Group, a unit of NBCUniversal) wherein Illumination produces the films as an independent contractor and Universal finances and distributes them.

The studio is best known for creating the Despicable Me, The Secret Life of Pets and Sing franchises, as well as the adaptations of Dr. Seuss' books The Lorax and How the Grinch Stole Christmas! and Nintendo video games, including The Super Mario Bros. Movie and The Super Mario Galaxy Movie. The Minions, characters from the Despicable Me series, are the mascots of the studio.

Illumination has produced 17 feature films, with an average gross of $651 million per film. Its first film, Despicable Me, was released on July 9, 2010, and its latest film, Minions & Monsters, was released on July 1, 2026; their upcoming slate of films include Not Alone on April 16, 2027, and an untitled Illumination / Nintendo film on April 12, 2028. Two of the studio's films—Minions (2015) and The Super Mario Bros. Movie (2023)—are among the 50 highest-grossing films of all time, with the latter having the highest-grossing opening for an animated film in its initial release; eight of their films are also among the 50 highest-grossing animated films.

== History ==
Logo used from 2009 to 2017; still used as a secondary logo

Chris Meledandri left as President of 20th Century Fox Animation and Blue Sky Studios in early 2007. While at those companies he supervised or executive-produced movies including Ice Age, Robots, Ice Age: The Meltdown, and Horton Hears a Who! After leaving, he founded his then-unnamed company and a deal was announced positioning his studio as Universal's family entertainment arm, that would produce one to two films a year starting in 2010. As part of the deal, Meledandri's then-unnamed unit retains creative control and Universal Pictures exclusively distributes the films.

In March 2008, Meledandri's studio deal with Universal revealed its company name as Illumination Entertainment.

In 2011, Illumination acquired the animation department of the French animation and visual effects studio Mac Guff, which animated Despicable Me and The Lorax, and formed Illumination Mac Guff (later Illumination Studios Paris).

On August 22, 2016, NBCUniversal acquired competing studio DreamWorks Animation, which fueled speculation that Meledandri was to oversee both studios. While he had been approached by NBCUniversal to oversee both studios, he turned down the offer and later explained "I love the process of making films and working with artists. I don't think I'm particularly great at managing companies." Meledandri instead became a consultant for the latter.

In February 23, 2017, Illumination tapped former Jim Henson Company exec Peter Schube as COO to replace Natalie Fischer.

On September 23, 2022, Illumination announced its hiring of former Netflix head of adult animation Mike Moon as senior creative advisor, and a new label led by Moon known as Moonlight, which will aim to "produce animated films that push beyond the family genre." However, Moon would leave Illumination in July 2024 to join Sony Pictures Animation, leaving the status of the division currently unknown.

== Process ==
Illumination does not produce its films in-house, where it is based in Santa Monica, but rather outsources the animation production of its films to other studios. Most of its films are animated by Illumination Studios Paris, a subsidiary formed through the purchase of Mac Guff (which animated the first Despicable Me). So far, the only Illumination film not to be animated by Illumination Studios Paris or Mac Guff was Hop, which was animated by Rhythm & Hues Studios.

Not unlike Pixar, in its early days, Illumination depended on a core group of directors and writers to create its films. The directors of Despicable Me—Pierre Coffin and Chris Renaud—also directed or co-directed its first two sequels, as well as The Lorax, Minions, and The Secret Life of Pets. Screenwriters Cinco Paul and Ken Daurio (who had written Horton Hears a Who! for Meledandri at Fox) wrote or co-wrote the first three Despicable Me films, Hop, The Lorax and The Secret Life of Pets, while screenwriter Brian Lynch wrote or co-wrote Hop, Minions, and The Secret Life of Pets.

Illumination's films generally have a budget between $60–80 million. Meledandri prefers to keep Illumination adhering to a low-cost model, recognizing that "strict cost controls and hit animated films are not mutually exclusive." In an industry where film expenses often exceed $100 million, Illumination's first two releases were completed with significantly lower budgets, considering Despicable Me's $69 million budget and Hop's $63 million budget. One way the company sustains a lean financial model is by employing cost-conscious animation techniques that lower the expenses and render times of its computer graphics. To date, The Super Mario Galaxy Movie is the studio's most expensive film, with a $110 million budget.

== Filmography ==
Release timeline
2010	Despicable Me
2011	Hop
2012	The Lorax
2013	Despicable Me 2
2014
2015	Minions
2016	The Secret Life of Pets
2016	Sing
2017	Despicable Me 3
2018	The Grinch
2019	The Secret Life of Pets 2
2020
2021	Sing 2
2022	Minions: The Rise of Gru
2023	The Super Mario Bros. Movie
2023	Migration
2024	Despicable Me 4
2025
2026	The Super Mario Galaxy Movie
2026	Minions & Monsters
2027	Not Alone
2028	Untitled Nintendo film
TBA	The Secret Life of Pets 3
TBA	Sing 3
TBA	Untitled Barbie film

The studio's first film, Despicable Me, directed by Chris Renaud and Pierre Coffin, was released on July 9, 2010, and was a commercial success, earning $56 million on its opening weekend, and going on to ticket sales of $251 million domestically and $543 million worldwide. Illumination's second film was Hop, which used Live-action animated. Directed by Tim Hill and released on April 1, 2011, the film had a $37 million opening, ending up with $108 million domestically and $183 million worldwide. Hop was followed by an adaptation of Dr. Seuss' The Lorax (also directed by Renaud), which debuted on March 2, 2012, earning $70 million on its opening weekend, and with eventual totals of $214 million in the US market and $348 million worldwide. The studio's first sequel, Despicable Me 2, again directed by Renaud and Coffin, opened in the United States on July 3, 2013, to a domestic five-day opening weekend of $142 million (and $82 million over the regular three-day frame), making it, at the time of its release, the biggest animated film to open on that frame. The film would go on to earn $368 million domestically and $970 million worldwide, becoming the second highest-grossing 2013 animated film and breaking a record as the most profitable Universal Pictures film in its 100-year history. A spin-off of the Despicable Me franchise, titled Minions, directed by Coffin and newcomer Kyle Balda, was released on July 10, 2015, to a domestic opening weekend of $115 million. The film would go on to gross $336 million domestically and $823 million overseas, amounting to a worldwide total of $1.159 billion, making it the highest-grossing animated film of 2015 and, at the time of its release, the second highest-grossing animated film of all time, behind Disney's Frozen (2013).

The Secret Life of Pets was released on July 8, 2016. Directed by Renaud and Yarrow Cheney, the film would earn $104 million in its opening weekend, going on to gross $368 million domestically, and $875 million worldwide. Sing, a comedy written and directed by Garth Jennings, was released on December 21, 2016. It was the first movie for the studio to have a Christmas release. The film would earn $56 million in its first 5 days, grossing $270 million stateside and $634 million worldwide. It also holds the record for the highest-grossing film not to ever be at No. 1 in its run. Despicable Me 3, which reunited Coffin and Balda as directors, was released on June 30, 2017, to a $75 million domestic opening weekend. The film would then go on to gross $264 million domestically and $1.034 billion worldwide, making it the second film from the studio to cross the $1 billion mark, as well as highest-grossing animated film of 2017. At the time of its release, it also set a record for the highest theatre count ever with 4,536 theatres in its second week. The film that followed was an adaptation of Dr. Seuss' How the Grinch Stole Christmas!, simply titled The Grinch, which was released on November 9, 2018, with Scott Mosier and Cheney as directors and featuring a screenplay by Michael LeSieur and Tommy Swerdlow. The film opened to $67 million in its first domestic weekend and went on to earn $271 million stateside and $513 million worldwide, making it the highest-grossing Christmas film of all time. The Secret Life of Pets 2, again directed by Renaud, was released on June 7, 2019, to a domestic opening weekend of $47 million, going on to gross $159 million stateside and $446 million worldwide, making less than half of its predecessor.

It was followed by Sing 2, again directed by Jennings, which was released on December 22, 2021. Despite opening to a modest $41 million over a five-day weekend (and $23 million over the normal three-day frame), the film would eventually become the highest-grossing animated film of 2021, as well as the tenth highest-grossing film of the year, earning $163 million stateside and $408 million worldwide. Minions: The Rise of Gru, directed by Balda, was released on July 1, 2022, after a delay of two years. The film earned $125 million stateside over the four-day July 4 weekend, a new record over said timeframe. The film would go on to overtake Sing 2 as the highest-grossing animated film during the pandemic, with $370 million domestically and $940 million worldwide.

The Super Mario Bros. Movie, an animated film based on the Mario video game franchise as a collaboration with Nintendo directed by Aaron Horvath and Michael Jelenic, was released on April 5, 2023. The film debuted to a $146.4 million domestic opening weekend, holding several box office records including the highest opening weekend for a video game adaptation as well as the highest opening weekend for Illumination. The film would go on to gross $574.9 million domestically and $1.36 billion worldwide, becoming the third Illumination film to cross the $1 billion mark, as well as the second highest-grossing film of 2023. Migration, an original film directed by Benjamin Renner, was released on December 22, 2023. It was followed by Despicable Me 4, directed by Renaud, on July 3, 2024. Then in 2026, The Super Mario Galaxy Movie was released on April 1, 2026, directed by Horvath and Jelenic, and Minions & Monsters was released on July 1, 2026, directed by Coffin.

On May 19, 2011, Illumination announced that it would be working with Universal Pictures to create Despicable Me Minion Mayhem, a 3-D ride at Universal Destinations & Experiences in Orlando, Hollywood, and Osaka. The ride officially opened on July 2, 2012, in Orlando, in Hollywood on April 12, 2014, and in Osaka on April 21, 2017. In April 2019, it was announced they would collaborate again on the creation of The Secret Life of Pets: Off the Leash!, a dark ride attraction at Universal Studios Hollywood. While its opening was scheduled for March 27, 2020, it was delayed until further notice due to COVID-19. It eventually opened on April 16, 2021.

Upcoming films include Not Alone on April 16, 2027, and an untitled Nintendo film on April 12, 2028. Other films the studio has in development include The Secret Life of Pets 3, and Sing 3. Additionally, Illumination is in negotiations with toy company Mattel to produce an animated film based on the Barbie series of fashion dolls.

In addition, two web short series are in development by Pierre Coffin: A Minions spin-off titled Who's Who, which was released on July 13, 2023, and an original series titled Bones Story. The shorts are released on TikTok and subsequently on YouTube.

=== Franchises ===
Title	Films	Shorts	TV specials	Web series	Release dates
Despicable Me / Minions	7	20	1	1	2010–present
Dr. Seuss	2	4	0	0	2012–2018
The Secret Life of Pets	2	3	0	0	2016–present
Sing	2	7	0	0	2016–present
Super Mario	2	0	0	0	2023–present

== See also ==
- Illumination Studios Paris
- DreamWorks Animation
- Universal Animation Studios
- List of Universal Pictures theatrical animated feature films
