= The Secret Life of Pets =

2016 American animated film

- Theatrical release poster
- Directed by: Chris Renaud
- Written by: Cinco Paul Ken Daurio; Brian Lynch
- Produced by: Chris Meledandri; Janet Healy
- Starring: Louis C.K.; Eric Stonestreet; Kevin Hart; Jenny Slate; Ellie Kemper; Lake Bell; Dana Carvey; Hannibal Buress; Bobby Moynihan; Steve Coogan; Albert Brooks
- Edited by: Ken Schretzmann
- Music by: Alexandre Desplat
- Production companies: Universal Pictures; Illumination Entertainment
- Distributed by: Universal Pictures
- Release dates: June 16, 2016 (AIAFF); July 8, 2016 (United States)
- Running time: 86 minutes
- Country: United States
- Language: English
- Budget: $75 million
- Box office: $886 million

The Secret Life of Pets is a 2016 American animated comedy film directed by Chris Renaud and written by Brian Lynch, Cinco Paul, and Ken Daurio. Produced by Universal Pictures and Illumination Entertainment, and distributed by Universal, the film stars the voices of Louis C.K., Eric Stonestreet, Jenny Slate, Kevin Hart, Lake Bell, Hannibal Buress, Bobby Moynihan, Dana Carvey, Ellie Kemper, Albert Brooks, and Steve Coogan. Taking place in New York City, the film's plot follows the relationship between a Jack Russell Terrier dog named Max (C.K.) and a giant, unruly dog named Duke (Stonestreet). It also follows what other pets do when their owners are gone away.

The Secret Life of Pets premiered at the Annecy International Animated Film Festival on June 16, 2016, and was theatrically released in the United States of America, on July 8 by Universal Pictures. The film received generally positive reviews and grossed $886 million worldwide, making it the sixth-highest-grossing film of 2016 as well as the year's most profitable release.

A sequel, The Secret Life of Pets 2, was released on June 7, 2019, with Patton Oswalt taking over the role of Max from Louis C.K.

== Plot ==
A Jack Russell Terrier named Max lives with his owner Katie in a New York City apartment. While she is away, he socializes with other pets in the building: tabby cat Chloe, pug Mel, dachshund Buddy, and budgerigar Sweet Pea. One day, Katie adopts the Newfoundland Duke, making Max envious. Enraged by Max's attitude, Duke tries to abandon Max in an alley, but they are both attacked by cats led by the cockney accented Sphynx cat Ozone who removes their collars and leaves them to be caught by animal control. Duke fears that he will be killed if he goes back to the pound.

Max and Duke are rescued by a rabbit named Snowball whom is the leader of "the Flushed Pets", a gang of drain-dwelling animals who hate humans because their owners abandoned them. After Max and Duke pretend to hate humans by saying they "killed" their owners, the Flushed Pets invite them to join. Before they can prove their loyalty through a viper bite, Snowball learns that Max and Duke are domesticated. With their cover blown, Max and Duke escape the drains and board a ferry to Brooklyn, inadvertently terminating the viper in the process. Snowball vows revenge and leads the Flushed Pets after them.

Meanwhile, Gidget, a white Pomeranian who is in love with Max, discovers that he is missing and decides to find him, recruiting red-tailed hawk Tiberius to find Max. He returns with Ozone, whom Gidget coerces into telling what he knows about the dogs. They then enlist Mel, Buddy, Chloe, guinea pig Norman and Sweet Pea. On the way, they meet Pops, an old Basset Hound who helps Gidget and the pets find Max. Gidget and her team later encounter Snowball, who vows to kill them as well, and Norman is captured as the rest of Gidget's team escapes the drain.

In the meantime, Duke tells Max about his previous owner Fred, who adopted him as a puppy and loved spending time with him. One day, Duke got lost and was caught by animal control, but Fred never came to claim him. They visit Fred's house nearby, confident he will still love Duke and take him back, but they learn from the resident cat Reginald that Fred passed away. Heartbroken, Duke accuses Max of attempting to get rid of him and barks at the new homeowners who have just returned to the house and called Animal Control. The handlers catch Max, but Duke interferes long enough for Max to escape and ends up being recaptured instead.

While trying to rescue Duke, Max is attacked by Snowball who tries to kill him. However, when his gang is captured, Snowball has to work together with Max to save them. They drive a bus into the animal control van on the Brooklyn Bridge, stopping traffic. The Flushed Pets encircle Max intending to harm him, unaware of Max's new partnership with Snowball, but they are saved by Gidget and her team. The van plummets into the East River as Max tries to free Duke, Snowball decides to jump into the river to give them the keys to Duke's cage and escape the van.

The entire group returns to the apartment block by pig-driven taxi. Snowball and the Flushed Pets form a new plan to annihilate all humans, but a girl named Molly arrives and adopts Snowball, and the remaining Flushed Pets head back to the drain. At first, Snowball resists, but gives in and lets himself become re-domesticated. The other pets return to their homes and reunite their owners, while Max and Duke reunite with Katie.

== Voice cast ==
- Louis C.K. as Max, a Jack Russell Terrier dog.
- Eric Stonestreet as Duke, a shaggy, brown Newfoundland dog who becomes Max's adoptive brother
- Kevin Hart as Snowball, a white rabbit
- Jenny Slate as Gidget, a Pomeranian dog
- Ellie Kemper as Katie, Max and Duke's owner
- Lake Bell as Chloe, a fat and apathetic grey tabby cat
- Dana Carvey as Pops, an elderly Basset Hound who is paralyzed in his back legs and has an owner who is never home
- Hannibal Buress as Buddy, a laid-back miniature dachshund
- Bobby Moynihan as Mel, a hyperactive pug
- Tara Strong as Sweetpea, a green and yellow budgie parakeet
- Steve Coogan as:
  - Ozone, a Cockney-accented Sphynx cat
  - Reginald, a Himalayan cat residing in Brooklyn
- Albert Brooks as Tiberius, a curmudgeonly red-tailed hawk
- Chris Renaud as Norman, a guinea pig who keeps getting lost trying to find his long-lost owner
- Michael Beattie as Tattoo, a slow-witted tattooed pig who is one of the Flushed Pets
- Sandra Echeverría as Maria, a character from the La Pasión de la Pasión telenovela that Gidget watches
- Jaime Camil as Fernando, another character from the La Pasión de la Pasión telenovela that Gidget watches
- Kiely Renaud as Molly, a little girl who adopts Snowball

== Production ==
Chris Renaud first became involved with the project in 2012, while he was still working on Despicable Me 2. At that time, Illumination Entertainment's CEO Chris Meledandri pitched him an idea on a film about what pets do when their caretakers are away. Although Renaud found the premise interesting, he and his team did not know what form the story would take, with them at one point considering making it a murder mystery, before deciding to make something "that was a bit more relatable". Additional characters were created by author Simon Rich while main character design and production design is provided by Eric Guillon.

The team used Jean-Jacques Sempé as an influence in designing the environment and attention was specifically paid to keep the designs "very vertically oriented". In keeping with the tradition of old Warner Bros. cartoons, the owners' faces are only occasionally seen. The home of the Flushed Pets was created to "hint at the darker side" of pet ownership "without, hopefully, getting too heavy", as well as to explore "this whole mythology in New York of the world that's unseen", while still maintaining the pet theme. The animation was created entirely in France by Illumination Mac Guff.

== Music ==
The original score for the film was composed by Alexandre Desplat. The soundtrack was released on July 1, 2016, by Back Lot Music.

== Release ==
=== Theatrical ===
The film was originally scheduled to be released on February 12, 2016, but was pushed back to July 8. It was released in 2D, 3D, RealD 3D, 4DX, and IMAX 3D using DMR. The Secret Life of Pets premiered at the 2016 Annecy International Animated Film Festival on June 16 and was screened at VidCon. A Despicable Me short film, entitled Mower Minions, was attached to the film's theatrical release.

=== Home media ===
The Secret Life of Pets was released on Digital HD on November 22, 2016, and on Blu-ray, Blu-ray 3D, Ultra HD Blu-ray, and DVD on December 6. In addition to the short film Mower Minions which was released theatrically with the feature film, the releases also include two short films: Norman Television and Weenie. The film was the sixth best-selling title of 2016 by making a revenue of $69.7 million from home media sales with 3.6 million units sold.

== Reception ==
=== Box office ===
The Secret Life of Pets grossed $369.1 million in Canada and the U.S. and $516.9 million in other countries for a worldwide total of $886 million against a production budget of $75 million. Its international takings helped push Universal Pictures [International] past $1 billion for the tenth consecutive year and aided Illumination Entertainment to pass the $4 billion mark for the first time since 2010.

It is the fifth-highest-grossing original worldwide film of all time (behind Avatar, Zootopia, The Lion King, and Finding Nemo), the sixth-highest-grossing film of 2016, and the 18th-highest-grossing animated film of all time. Deadline Hollywood calculated the net profit of the film to be $374.6 million when factoring together all expenses and revenues for the film, making it the most profitable release of 2016.

==== North America ====
In Canada and the United States, the film was projected to gross around $70 million in its opening weekend with some predictions going as high as $100 million. It received the widest release for an animated film as well as for a PG-rated film (breaking Shrek Forever After's record) and the seventh-widest of all time overall across 4,370 theaters, the widest release since The Dark Knight Rises. It made $5.3 million from Thursday night previews in 3,009 theaters which is the second-biggest of all time for Illumination behind only Minions ($6.2 million), and the third biggest of all time for an animated film behind Finding Dory ($9.2 million) and Minions. This was followed by a record-breaking $38.5 million opening day gross (including previews), the biggest for an original film. In its opening weekend, it exceeded expectations and grossed $104.4 million, finishing first at the box office. Its debut is the sixth-biggest for an animated film, the sixth highest weekend debut in July, and the fourth-biggest opening weekend for Universal Pictures. It also set the record for the largest opening for an original animated film, eclipsing the $90.4 million debut of Inside Out.

In its second weekend, the film made $50.8 million (-51.3%) while maintaining the top spot, despite facing stiff competition with newcomer Ghostbusters. Although it slipped into second place when overtaken by Star Trek Beyond in its third weekend, it was still able to fend off the two other new releases—Lights Out and Ice Age: Collision Course—by earning another $29.6 million. It passed $300 million on its twenty-sixth day—the same day it crossed $400 million worldwide—becoming the seventh film of 2016, the seventh Universal Pictures film (the first for the year), and the twelfth animated film overall to reach the benchmark.

==== Outside North America ====
Internationally, The Secret Life of Pets received a scattered release from June to September in a total of 69 markets, and faced competition from other animated films such as Finding Dory and Ice Age: Collision Course in the course of its release. In total, it had number-one openings in 45 markets and recorded the biggest opening for an original animated film in 17 territories, and the No. 1 animated film of 2016 to date in 13 markets. It topped the international box office in its ninth weekend after earning $43.8 million in 53 markets (dethroning Suicide Squad). However, this was not the film's biggest single weekend gross. Its biggest weekend gross was actually in its seventh weekend when it grossed $69.3 million. It opened at No. 3 behind Suicide Squad ($133.3 million) and the Chinese film Time Raiders ($64.6 million) that weekend.

It was released in the United Kingdom and Norway two weeks ahead of its U.S. release, where it grossed a combined total of $14.1 million in the two markets. Prior to its official debut in the UK and the Republic of Ireland on June 24, the film had two days' worth of previews on June 18 and 19 from which it made £3.63 million ($5.2 million) in two days. This figure was later counted in the film's official opening weekend. It went on to score the fourth-biggest original animation opening weekend ever there, with £9.58 million ($13.4 million) from 592 theaters, trailing behind Inside Out, Monsters, Inc., and Up. Excluding previews, its total three-day opening was $8.1 million. This was amidst Brexit and despite facing competition from Independence Day: Resurgence. The film held off extremely well in its second and third weekend falling just 20% and 24%, earning £4.47 million ($6.1 million) and £3.62 million ($4.8 million) respectively despite facing some competitions. It has topped the box office for three consecutive weekends and has grossed total of $41 million there. In Norway, it took the number one spot as well, with $778,000. It scored the biggest animation opening of 2016 and the second-biggest of all time overall in both Taiwan ($2 million)—behind Madagascar, and Hong Kong ($1.9 million)—behind Inside Out.

In Argentina, the film had a record-breaking number-one debut with $4 million from 195 screens—the biggest opening weekend ever for an animated film and the second-biggest opening ever for any film (behind Furious 7). Similarly, Chile also recorded the second-biggest animated opening ever with $1.7 million (behind Minions). Colombia also opened at No. 1 with a huge $1.5 million. In Mexico, other than opening at No. 1, it posted the biggest original animated opening of all time with $7.6 million, surpassing the studio's own previous record holder Inside Out. Also in Russia, it scored the biggest original animated opening and the second-biggest ever for an animated film behind Minions with $16.3 million, although this included $6.4 million five days' worth of previews. It went on to become the highest-grossing film of the summer that year. In Japan, the film opened on August 11—the date of Japan's first Mountain Day national holiday—with Toho-Towa distributing, and earned $4.6 million on 370,000 admissions for its two-day opening weekend dethroning Shin Godzilla off the top spot. The cumulative total for the four-day holiday (August 11–14) was $9.7 million. Similarly, it had number-one debuts in Germany ($7.1 million), France ($5.9 million), Australia ($5.6 million), Italy ($5.1 million), Brazil ($4.4 million), Spain ($4.5 million), Poland ($1.7 million), Singapore ($1.3 million), Belgium ($1.2 million), Denmark ($1.2 million), Indonesia ($1.1 million), the Philippines ($1 million), and South Africa ($463,000). In Germany, it scored the best animation opening since Minions. It topped the box office in Israel for five straight weekends and in Australia, Russia and Spain for three weekends. In Japan, the film was the highest-grossing foreign release of the weekend, holding the top spot for four consecutive weekends.

In China—the world's second-biggest film market—the film opened on a Tuesday, earning a modest $5.2 million on its opening day. To Sunday, it achieved a six-day opening of $29.3 million and $15.5 million for the weekend alone (Friday to Sunday), with per screen averages over $500 per screen per day. In both instances, it was behind the local film Time Raiders. In South Korea, despite debuting in fifth place, it had an opening of $6.9 million. Elsewhere, it grossed $2.7 million in the Netherlands, $1.2 million in Sweden and in Hungary, it scored the biggest opening of the year with $738,000, and also in Portugal ($965,000), Latvia ($224,000), and South Africa.

In terms of total earnings, its biggest markets are China ($58 million), United Kingdom and Ireland ($47.2 million), Japan ($41.6 million) and Russia ($34.2 million). It became the third-highest-grossing film of all time in Russia (behind Avatar and Zootopia) and the highest-grossing film of 2016 in Spain.

=== Critical response ===
On Rotten Tomatoes, the film has an approval rating of 71% based on 242 reviews with an average rating of 6.3/10. The website's critical consensus reads: "Fast-paced, funny, and blessed with a talented voice cast, The Secret Life of Pets offers a beautifully animated, cheerfully undemanding family-friendly diversion." On Metacritic, the film has a score of 61 out of 100 based on 39 critics, indicating "generally favorable reviews". Audiences polled by CinemaScore gave the film an average grade of "A−" on an A+ to F scale, while PostTrak reported filmgoers gave it a 85% overall positive score and a 93% "definite recommend".

Peter Travers of Rolling Stone gave the film three out of four stars and called it "an animated fluffball—a sort of Toy Story with pets does everything to drive you crazy and ends up being totally irresistible." Scott Tobias, writing for NPR, characterized the film's concept as "Toy Story but with house pets," highlighting the film's "thinly distinguished characters" and "gloppy sentimentality". Steven Rea of The Philadelphia Inquirer gave the film three out of four stars and said "In much the same way that the smash Zootopia demonstrated that creatures of different culture and class and species are better off when they come together, The Secret Life of Pets is a testament to teamwork and friendship and fixing the rifts that divide us. Let the fur—and the warm, fuzzy feelings—fly."

Some critics disliked the film's similarities to Toy Story. Matthew Parkinson of The Escapist compared the plots of both films and wrote that "The Secret Life of Pets feels like one of those hour-long ripoffs you'd see on a children's television network." Ethan Anderton of the website /Film criticized the film's characterization, and noted that the relationship between Max and Duke was akin to "Woody and Buzz Lightyear all over again."

== Accolades ==
List of awards and nominations
Award	Date of ceremony	Category	Recipients	Result	Ref.
Annie Awards	February 4, 2017	Outstanding Achievement, Character Design in an Animated Feature Production	Eric Guillon	Nominated	
Annie Awards	February 4, 2017	Outstanding Achievement, Music in an Animated Feature Production	Alexandre Desplat	Nominated	
British Academy Children's Awards	November 20, 2016	BAFTA Kids' Vote	The Secret Life of Pets	Nominated	
Cinema Audio Society	February 18, 2017	Outstanding Achievement in Sound Mixing for a Motion Picture – Animated	David Acord, Jason Butler, Gary A. Rizzo, Carlos Sotolongo and Frank Wolf	Nominated	
Hollywood Music in Media Awards	November 17, 2016	Best Original Score – Animated Film	Alexandre Desplat	Won	
International Film Music Critics Association	February 21, 2017	Best Original Score for a Comedy Film	Alexandre Desplat	Nominated	
2017 Kids' Choice Awards	March 11, 2017	Favorite Animated Movie	The Secret Life of Pets	Nominated	
2017 Kids' Choice Awards	March 11, 2017	Favorite Voice From an Animated Movie	Kevin Hart	Nominated	
2017 Kids' Choice Awards	March 11, 2017	Favorite Villain	Kevin Hart	Won	
2017 Kids' Choice Awards	March 11, 2017	Most Wanted Pet	Kevin Hart	Won	
NAACP Image Awards	February 11, 2017	Outstanding Character Voice-Over Performance	Kevin Hart	Nominated	
People's Choice Awards	January 18, 2017	Favorite Family Movie	The Secret Life of Pets	Nominated	
People's Choice Awards	January 18, 2017	Favorite Animated Movie Voice	Kevin Hart	Nominated	
Producers Guild of America	January 28, 2017	Best Animated Motion Picture	Janet Healy and Chris Meledandri	Nominated	

== Sequels ==
A sequel, The Secret Life of Pets 2—with Renaud, producers Meledandri and Janet Healy, and writer Brian Lynch returning—was released on June 7, 2019. C.K. was replaced by Patton Oswalt.

In an interview on the podcast The Gary and Kenny Show, Meledandri stated that a third film is in development.
