= Minions (film series) =

American film series

- Logo for the series
- Created by: Pierre Coffin; Cinco Paul; Ken Daurio; Sergio Pablos
- Original work: Minions (2015)
- Owners: Illumination; Universal Pictures
- Years: 2015–present

Films and television
- Films: Minions (2015); Minions: The Rise of Gru (2022); Minions & Monsters (2026)
- Short film: Minions short films
- Web series: Minions digital series
- Television special: Minions Holiday Special (2020)

Games
- Video game: Minions video games

Audio
- Soundtracks: Minions; Minions: The Rise of Gru; Minions & Monsters

Minions is an American film series produced by Illumination. It is a spin-off to the Despicable Me franchise, focusing on the origins of Gru's Minions. Like the original franchise, it is produced by Illumination and distributed by its parent company Universal Pictures. The series has been commercially successful, with the first installment, Minions, being the first non-Disney animated film to pass the one billion mark at the box office.

== Feature films ==
| Film | Release date | Director(s) | Screenwriter(s) | Producers |
|---|---|---|---|---|
| Minions | July 10, 2015 | Pierre Coffin and Kyle Balda | Brian Lynch | Chris Meledandri and Janet Healy |
| Minions: The Rise of Gru | July 1, 2022 | Kyle Balda | Matthew Fogel | Chris Meledandri, Janet Healy and Chris Renaud |
| Minions & Monsters | July 1, 2026 | Pierre Coffin | Brian Lynch and Pierre Coffin | Chris Meledandri and Bill Ryan |

=== Minions (2015) ===
The Minions, described as the oldest beings in the universe, search for the most evil master they can possibly serve. They eventually come across Scarlet Overkill, a popular villainess who hires them to steal St Edward's Crown.

Minions debuted in London on June 11, 2015, and was released in the United States on July 10.

=== Minions: The Rise of Gru (2022) ===
An eleven-year-old Gru plans to become a supervillain with the help of his Minions, which leads to a showdown with a malevolent team, the Vicious 6.

Minions: The Rise of Gru debuted at the Annecy International Animation Film Festival on June 13, 2022, and was released in the United States on July 1.

=== Minions & Monsters (2026) ===
In the 1920s, the Minions aim to find monsters to cast in their monster movie.

Minions & Monsters was released on July 1, 2026 after initially being set for release on June 30, 2027.

== Short films ==
=== Cro Minion (2015) ===
Released on the Minions DVD and Blu-ray.

Two caveman Minions look after a cave baby while their boss goes to find a bull to eat for lunch. But it is harder than the Minions think.

=== Competition (2015) ===
Released on the Minions DVD and Blu-ray.

Two Minions challenge themselves to numerous attacks, ending up on the lab's conveyor belt in the process.

=== Binky Nelson Unpacified (2015) ===
Released on the Minions DVD and Blu-ray.

The Nelsons' youngest son Binky, having lost his pacifier after a successful robbery at a museum, sets out on a mission to retrieve it. Notably, it is the first mini-movie to not star the Minions or feature them in any capacity.

=== Minions & Monsters (2021) ===
Aired on NBC on June 11, 2021 and included in the Minions: The Rise of Gru DVD and Blu-ray.

A rookie Minion joins other Minions in a tabletop role-playing game.

=== Post Modern Minion (2022) ===
Released on the Minions: The Rise of Gru DVD and Blu-ray.

When a Minion crashes into an art gallery, an art critic praises his creation and he becomes an overnight celebrity.

== Other media ==
=== Television specials ===
==== Minions Holiday Special (2020) ====
The first TV special, Minions Holiday Special, is a half-hour compilation of Minions mini-movies, containing Santa's Little Helpers, Training Wheels, Puppy, and Minion Scouts. Additionally, the special includes holiday-themed interstitials featuring characters from Illumination's The Secret Life of Pets and Sing franchises. The special aired on NBC on November 27, 2020.

Miranda Cosgrove, who voices Margo in the films, provides narration between the short segments.

=== Digital series ===
Saturday Morning Minions is a comedy slapstick cartoon. It debuted in the United States on Illumination's social media on June 9, 2021, released weekly on Saturdays, and consists of 40 episodes. The series features a 2D animation style. Who's Who was released on TikTok and subsequently on YouTube.

== Outside media ==
=== Video game ===
A free-to-play mobile game developed by Electronic Arts (otherwise known as EA), titled Minions Paradise, was released in the summer of 2015. Playing as Phil, players will help Minions design and build their own utopia set in a tropical environment. The game was removed from the App Store on May 22, 2017.

=== Theme park attractions ===
Universal Studios Florida features an entire Minion Land with a moving-walkway shooter attraction titled Villain-Con: Minion Blast. The attraction is also at Universal Studios Japan.

In 2026, Universal Kids Resort will include a themed land based on the Despicable Me franchise, known as Minions vs Minions: Bello Bay Club. The area will contain a river rapids ride.

== Cast and characters ==
List indicators

This section includes characters who will appear or have appeared in the feature films.

- An empty grey cell indicates the character was not in the film, or that the character's official presence has not yet been confirmed.
- ^{A} indicates an appearance through archival footage or audio.
- ^{C} indicates a cameo role.

| Character | Main films | | |
| Character | Minions | Minions: The Rise of Gru | Minions & Monsters |
| Character | 2015 | 2022 | 2026 |
=== Introduced in Minions ===
| Minions | Pierre Coffin | Pierre Coffin | Pierre Coffin |
| Felonious Gru Sr. | Steve Carell | Steve Carell | Steve Carell^{C} |
| Dr. Nefario | Silent role | Russell Brand | Romesh Ranganathan^{C} |
| Marlena Gru | Silent role | Julie Andrews | |
| Scarlett Overkill | Sandra Bullock | Photograph | |
| Herb Overkill | Jon Hamm | | |
| Elizabeth II | Jennifer Saunders | | |
| Walter Nelson | Michael Keaton | | |
| Madge Nelson | Allison Janney | | |
| Tina Nelson | Katy Mixon | | |
| Walter Jr. | Michael Beattie | | |
| Binky Nelson | Character is mute | | |
| Narrator | Geoffrey Rush | | |
=== Introduced in Minions: The Rise of Gru ===
| Wild Knuckles | | Alan Arkin | |
| Belle Bottom | | Taraji P. Henson | |
| Jean-Clawed | | Jean-Claude Van Damme | |
| Nun-Chuck | | Lucy Lawless | |
| Svengeance | | Dolph Lundgren | |
| Stronghold | | Danny Trejo | |
| Master Chow | | Michelle Yeoh | |
| Biker | | RZA | |
| Mr. Perkins | | Will Arnett | |
| Silas Ramsbottom | | Steve Coogan | |
=== Introduced in Minions & Monsters ===
| Goomi | | | Trey Parker |
| Phillips | | | Bobby Moynihan |
| Howard | | | Phil LaMarr |
| Dort | | | Jesse Eisenberg |
| Olivia H. | | | Allison Janney |
| Max | | | Christoph Waltz |
| Debbie | | | Zoey Deutch |
| Frank Bright | | | Jeff Bridges |
| Elwood Bright | | | Jeff Bridges |
| George Lucas | | | George Lucas^{C} |
| Agnes Gru | | | Madison Polan^{C} |

== Crew ==
| Role | Films | | |
| Role | Minions | Minions: The Rise of Gru | Minions & Monsters |
|---|---|---|---|
| Director(s) | Pierre Coffin; Kyle Balda | Kyle Balda Co-Directors: Brad Ableson; Jonathan del Val | Pierre Coffin Co-Director: Patrick Delage |
| Producer(s) | Chris Meledandri; Janet Healy | Chris Meledandri; Janet Healy; Chris Renaud | Chris Meledandri; Bill Ryan |
| Executive Producer(s) | Chris Renaud | Brett Hoffman; Latifa Ouaou | Brian Lynch; Chris Renaud |
| Writer(s) | Brian Lynch | Screenplay: Matthew Fogel Story: Brian Lynch; Matthew Fogel | Brian Lynch; Pierre Coffin |
| Composer(s) | Heitor Pereira | Heitor Pereira | John Powell |
| Editor(s) | Claire Dodgson | Claire Dodgson | Gregory Perler |
| Studio(s) | Illumination | Illumination | Illumination |
| Distributor(s) | Universal Pictures | Universal Pictures | Universal Pictures |

== Reception ==
=== Box office performance ===
| Film | U.S. release date | Box office gross | | | All-time ranking | | Budget | Ref. |
| Film | U.S. release date | U.S. and Canada | Other territories | Worldwide | U.S. and Canada | Worldwide | Budget | Ref. |
|---|---|---|---|---|---|---|---|---|
| Minions | July 10, 2015 | $336,045,770 | $823,352,627 | $1,159,398,397 | 74 | 26 | $74,000,000 | |
| Minions: The Rise of Gru | July 1, 2022 | $370,549,695 | $569,933,000 | $940,482,695 | 57 | 66 | $80,000,000 | |
| Minions & Monsters | July 1, 2026 | $183,161,980 | $335,862,124 | $519,024,104 | | | $85,000,000 | |
| Total | | $705,740,980 | $1,393,285,627 | $2,099,026,607 | | | $239,000,000 | |

=== Critical and public response ===
| Film | Critical | | Public |
| Film | Rotten Tomatoes | Metacritic | CinemaScore |
|---|---|---|---|
| Minions | 55% (223 reviews) | 56 (35 reviews) | A |
| Minions: The Rise of Gru | 70% (184 reviews) | 56 (41 reviews) | A |
| Minions & Monsters | 89% (182 reviews) | 70 (30 reviews) | A– |

=== Accolades ===
Minions was nominated for BAFTA Award for Best Animated Film in 2016.
