= Nh. Dini =

Indonesian novelist and feminist (1936–2018)

- Born: Nurhayati Srihardini Siti Nukatin; 29 February 1936; Semarang, Central Java, Dutch East Indies
- Died: 4 December 2018 (aged 82); Semarang, Central Java, Indonesia
- Occupations: Novelist, feminist
- Spouse: Yves Coffin (m. 1960; div. 1984)
- Children: 2, including Pierre Coffin

Nurhayati Srihardini Siti Nukatin Coffin (29 February 1936 – 4 December 2018), better known by her pen name Nh. Dini (sometimes NH Dini in English), was an Indonesian novelist and feminist. She was the mother of Pierre Coffin, a French director and animator known for the Despicable Me franchise. She was one of the recipients of the literature award from the SEA Write Award in 2003.

== Life ==
Dini was born on 29 February 1936 in Semarang to Saljowilijo and Kusaminah, she was of Javanese and Bugis ancestry and had four siblings. Dini said that she began to love writing when she was in the second grade. Her mother was a batik artist, inspired by Javanese culture. She would read stories and poems to Dini that were written in the traditional Javanese alphabet. Her talent for writing fiction was soon confirmed. At the age of fifteen she read her poems on RRI (the state radio network) in Semarang.

In 1956, while working as a flight attendant for Garuda Indonesian Airways, she published a series of stories called Dua Dunia (Two Worlds). She also worked briefly as a radio announcer.

In 1960, she married Yves Coffin, French consul to Kobe, Japan. Two children were born of their marriage: Marie-Claire Lintang and Pierre-Louis Padang, who is widely known for co-directing all four films in the Despicable Me franchise. She initially lived with her husband in Japan; they were then posted to Phnom Penh. They returned to France in 1966. Later, they were posted to Manila. In 1976, they were posted to Detroit.

The couple were divorced in 1984. She returned to Indonesia and later reclaimed her Indonesian nationality. For many years, she operated a non-profit agency devoted to juvenile literacy.

She received the S.E.A. Write Award in 2003, when she was living in Sleman, near Yogyakarta. Towards the end of her life, she moved to a nursing home, where she had to suspend work on a novel and her memoirs due to worsening attacks of vertigo. She spent her last years in a Catholic retirement home in Semarang.

== Death ==
Dini died on 4 December 2018 as a result of a vehicle collision between the Toyota Avanza taxi car she rode in and a truck on a highway in Semarang. Her body was cremated on the next day in Ambarawa.

== Legacy ==
On February 29, 2020, Google celebrated her 84th birthday with a Google Doodle.

== Publications ==
=== Indonesian ===
==== Novels ====
- Hati yang Damai (The Peaceful Heart) (1961)
- Pada Sebuah Kapal (Once Upon A Ship) (1973)
- La Barka (1975)
- Namaku Hiroko (My Name is Hiroko) (1977)
- Keberangkatan (Departures) (1977)
- Orang-orang Trans (The Transmigrants) (1985)
- Pertemuan Dua Hati (The Meeting of Two Hearts) (1986)

=== English ===
- A Journey (short story) in "Black Clouds Over the Isle of Gods", edited by David Roskies. M. E. Sharpe (1997) ISBN 0-7656-0033-1
- The Chicken (short story) in "Diverse Lives" edited by Jeanette Lingard, Oxford Asia (1995) ISBN 967-65-3100-6
- Hill, D.T (1993), The Factory by Nh. Dini (Translated by David T. Hill, Includes Translator's introductory comments), Southeast Asia Program, Cornell University
