= Minions (Despicable Me) =

Fictional film characters

- Despicable Me race
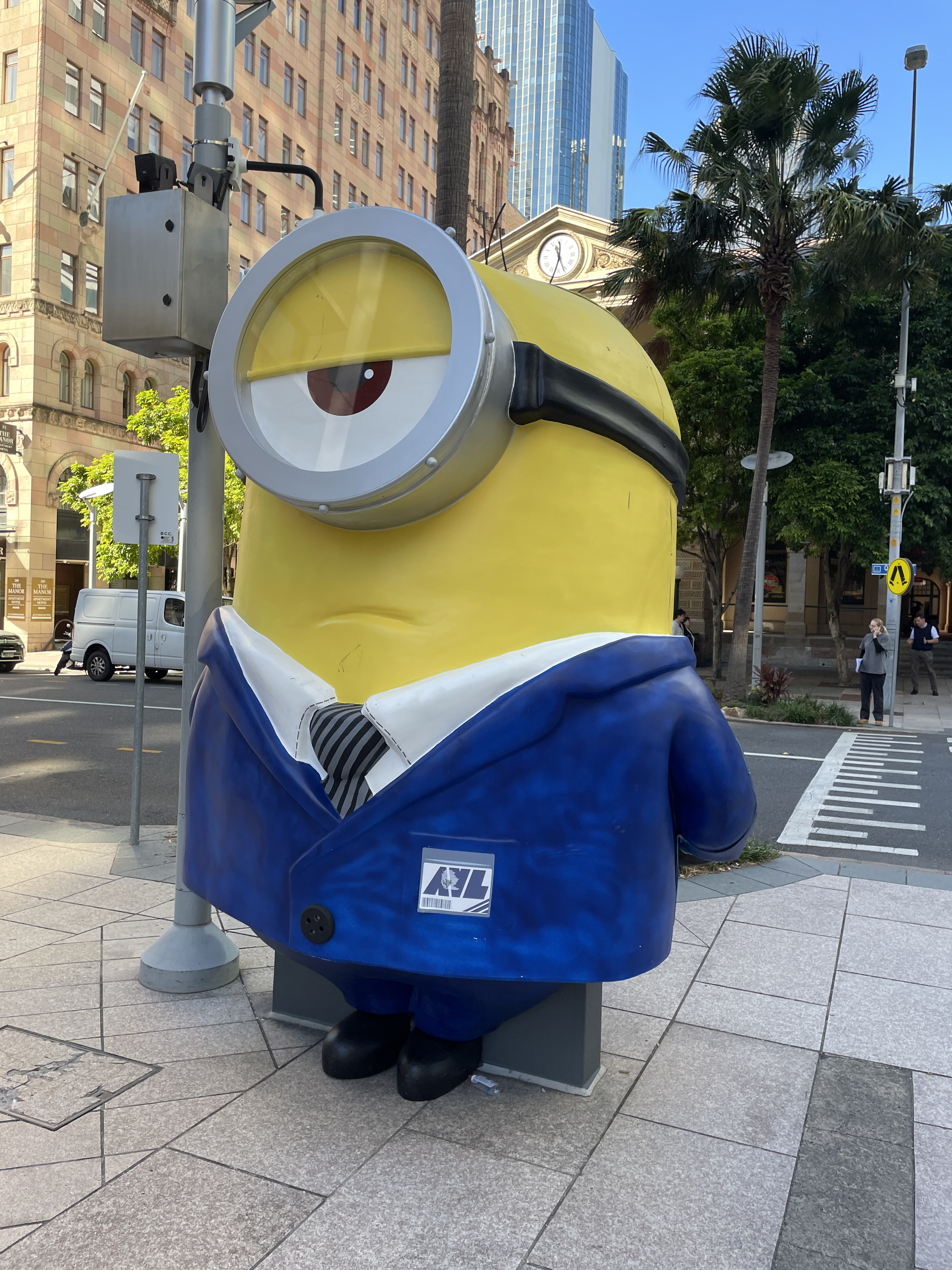
- Sculpture of a Minion in Brisbane, Australia
- First appearance: Despicable Me (2010)
- Created by: Éric Guillon; Pierre Coffin; Chris Renaud
- Genre: Comedy

In-universe information
- Home world: Earth
- Language: Minionese
- Leader: Gru

Minions (/ˈmɪnjənz/) are a fictional all-male species of yellow capsule-shaped creatures that appear in Illumination's Despicable Me franchise, created by Eric Guillon, Pierre Coffin, and Chris Renaud. Their first appearance was in Despicable Me (2010), where they serve as the henchmen of the film's protagonist, a supervillain named Gru. The Minions are characterized by their comedic behavior and their fictional language named Minionese, which is largely unintelligible.

The Minions play a prominent role in the Despicable Me film tetralogy, additionally starring in their own prequel series, beginning with Minions (2015) and continuing with Minions: The Rise of Gru (2022) and Minions & Monsters (2026). Although they are similar in appearance, several Minions play major roles in the films, such as Kevin, Stuart and Bob. The Minions have also made appearances in short films, an animated web series, Minion Land rides and attractions at Universal Studios Theme Parks, video games and comics.

As the official mascots for Illumination, they have been promoted as corporate icons for Comcast in the years since its 2013 purchase of Illumination's parent company NBCUniversal, similar to Mickey Mouse for the Walt Disney Company. Despite starting out as supporting characters, the global popularity of the Minions has grown, resulting in them becoming ubiquitous in online memes, corporate culture and merchandise. Critics have described them as a "cultural phenomenon" due to their gibberish, childish brand of humor, and simplistic design being translatable across cultures.

== Concept and creation ==
=== Development ===
Early concept art by Eric Guillon shows how the Minions evolved from human factory workers and robots.

The initial concept for Despicable Me was conceived by Sergio Pablos. He had worked as a supervising animator at Walt Disney Animation Studios but returned to Spain to start his own company. Pablos pitched the idea for Evil Me to American film producer Chris Meledandri, who was launching Illumination Entertainment. The Minions were not initially in the script of Despicable Me, but during the development, the directors Pierre Coffin and Chris Renaud, character designer Eric Guillon and Meledandri conceived the Minions to provide comic relief and to help audiences sympathise with Gru, the film's protagonist. Coffin and Renaud were influenced by similar characters, such as the Oompa-Loompas from Charlie and the Chocolate Factory, and Jawas in Star Wars, realising that the Minions' short stature made them appealing. Coffin explained that their design morphed from unlikeable, muscular thugs working for Gru to "subterranean mole men-type creatures" wearing goggles and overalls. They were initially designed as human factory workers with a short stature to contrast with Gru's height. This idea evolved into robots to make them more innocent, before the team decided to settle on a robot-human synthesis. Their final design was simplified to create a more child-like form. The studio's limited budget and technology helped to give character to the Minions. Coffin explained: "Just with a ball, you can animate it so that it feels sad or angry, and the Minions had that simplicity graphically". He likened the Minions' animation to a silent film, having been influenced by Charlie Chaplin, Harold Lloyd and Buster Keaton, as the characters need to convey story, emotion and humor largely without words.

For Despicable Me 2, co-writers Ken Daurio and Cinco Paul purposefully added more Minions and gave them more screen time due to the positive reaction of audiences. The creative team discussed the idea of giving the Minions superpowers, but instead chose to create mutated, evil purple Minions. Renaud said that Looney Tunes was an inspiration for the evil Minions, citing a cartoon where Tweety Bird drinks a formula that transforms him into a hairy monster. Producer Janet Healy considered the purple Minions to be the ideal antithesis for their cute yellow counterparts, being on the opposite side of the color spectrum and being hairy rather than bald.

Coffin knew that the Minions were valuable characters, but admitted that the team were concerned about whether they could carry their own spin-off film. They were convinced to proceed when screenwriter Brian Lynch pitched the plot for a prequel. The plot of Minions was driven by audience demand for the characters. Meledandri said that the creative team started with the commonly asked question of the Minions' origin: "Where did the Minions come from, and what was their life like before Gru?". They realised from the outset that creating a film around characters that do not speak a comprehensible language would be challenging. During the development of Minions the creative team focused on creating moments of emotional slapstick, drawing from films by Chaplin, particularly The Great Dictator (1940). They also took inspiration from the films of David Lean, such as Doctor Zhivago (1965) and Lawrence of Arabia (1962), with the intention of creating epic scenes that emphasise the small size of the characters. The team realised that they needed to shape the Minions as individual characters, thus Kevin was designed as a "big brotherly character", Stuart as an "impertinent, lazy teenager", and Bob as an "innocent kid", but all were defined by their idiocy. Balda said that the main challenge was to retain the Minions' collective characteristics but also draw out their individual personalities. Coffin recognised that an overuse of the Minions could become irritating so human characters as well as 1960s music and cultural references were introduced to take some focus off them.

In Despicable Me 3, the design of the Minion named Mel, who leads a revolt against Gru, was based on Meledandri. Co-director Eric Guillon said that, having previously drawn him on a birthday card as a Minion, he took the same design and used it for Mel. Many ideas for the Minions' storylines originate from Coffin. Director Kyle Balda explained how Coffin's love of musical theatre helped to introduce some concepts for the third film involving the Minions getting into trouble and appearing on a talent show.

The creative team approached Despicable Me 4 with the Minions being agents of the Anti-Villain League, but they decided that it was not enough. The superhero idea had persisted from the previous films, so the fourth film introduced the Mega Minions, a group of five Minions named Jerry, Dave, Tim, Mel and Gus, with abilities similar to the Fantastic Four. Renaud said that they wanted to give the Minions some distinction from other superheroes but this was realised in the Minions' comedic nature by their incompetency in using their powers. Due to their limited screen time, the team of Minions were given simple powers: Dave has super strength, Jerry transforms into a rock, Tim has super stretch abilities, Mel creates a heat ray and Gus has the ability to fly. Renaud said that their powers were drawn from their appearances. The role of the Mega Minions was ultimately reduced to avoid the film being too similar to a Marvel film.

=== Animation ===
Art director Pierre Leduc said that animating the Minions was challenging because they have no eyebrows, which typically help to show a character's emotions. The animators solved this by using body language to express the Minions' feelings. Due to their limited body shape, such as their short arms, the animation team had to find ways to help them move. The animators were encouraged to think of ideas to make the Minions more comical. During development, they mimed or filmed themselves but their movements had to be made less realistic to fit the movement of the characters. Leduc cited Chuck Jones cartoons as one of the animation team's influences. He said that the animation was done by hand, with the animation team using tools in Maya software, including a pose library and a library of crowd movements, such as walking, running and cheering. For Minions, Leduc said they needed to make the three main Minions understandable without words, so they illustrated their emotions in their movements, thus Bob moves with the body language of a child. This ensured that the audience could differentiate between the Minion characters.

=== Voice actors ===
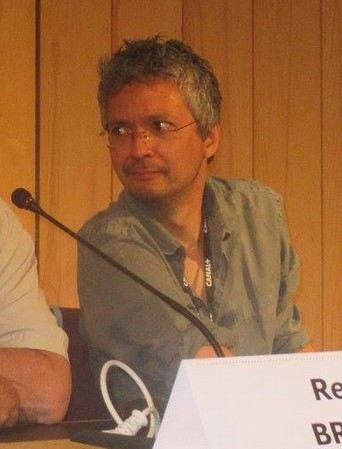
Pierre Coffin has continued to voice the Minions throughout the Despicable Me film franchise.

During the development of the first film, Coffin provided the characters' dialogue temporarily until a voice actor could be cast, but after test audiences responded positively to his vocals, he continued to voice the Minions through to Minions & Monsters. The Minions were voiced by Coffin, Renaud, and Jemaine Clement. Coffin voiced Tim, Bob, Mark, Phil, and Stuart, Renaud voiced Dave, and Clement voiced Jerry. Coffin and Renaud later reprised their roles in Despicable Me 2, while Coffin assumed sole duties in Minions (2015), Despicable Me 3 (2017), Minions: The Rise of Gru (2022),, Despicable Me 4 (2024), and Minions & Monsters (2026). In the 2010 video game, they are voiced by James Arnold Taylor.

== Characteristics ==
The Minions are small, yellow capsule-shaped creatures with round, gray goggles. Their faces feature one or two eyes and they typically wear blue overalls. As henchmen, their purpose is to serve a villain, but they are typically incompetent, selfish and easily distracted. They vary in height but are difficult to differentiate, although each Minion has his own name and personality. According to Coffin, all of the Minions are male, although they sometimes dress as female. Coffin stated that he could not imagine them as female because they are often "dumb and stupid". The 2015 animated feature film Minions shows that they have existed since the beginning of life on Earth and evolved from single-celled organisms. Minions are biologically wired to seek out and serve villains, including notable fictional characters such as Count Dracula and real-life historical figures like Napoleon, although their devotion often accidentally leads to the villain's demise. When they have no "boss" to serve, the Minions become depressed and listless. They have a degree of invulnerability, able to survive being tortured, buried or crushed. A recurring theme in the franchise is that the Minions have an obsession with bananas. Balda commented that although they serve a villain, the Minions are not inherently evil, they are just flawed. They are mischievous but good natured and events usually work out in their favour. He described their relationship with Gru as an "old married couple", defined by a love and need for each other but equally filled with frustrations and complaints.

=== Language ===
"When you look at the history of films, they start out as being totally mute with actors like Charlie Chaplin and Buster Keaton. Those guys were the best storytellers ever, and it goes across generations. I showed my kids The Gold Rush, and they loved it. There are no words in it, obviously, but they were just hooked on the visuals. Everything was so timed and well-executed without any language. The Minions are all about that. They're this legacy of silent films, except that we stuck ridiculous words on them."

— Pierre Coffin explaining the language of the Minions

The Minions speak in a fictional pidgin language, called Minionese, which features a combination of gibberish mixed with words from real languages such as, but not limited to, English, French, Spanish, Indonesian, Hindi, Korean, Filipino and Italian. Although seemingly nonsensical, in many countries the English-sounding dialogue is dubbed in order to make the sounds somewhat recognizable. Coffin did not plan a constructed language from the outset. Instead it evolved over the course of the films, being largely gibberish in the first film. He said that in the second film he needed the language to carry more story so he added more meaningful words, and this was expanded in the Minions spin-off film. He said that the Minions' origin story showing how they serve various villains through history helped to explain why their language comprises words from so many real languages. Coffin explained that the language is designed to be comprehensible by creating a "particular magical rhythm and melody" using words chosen for their sound, but requires the visuals for it to make sense. The Minions have common English-language names, such as Kevin, Stuart and Bob (the lead trio in Minions and Minions: The Rise of Gru), Mel (the leader of the Minions in Despicable Me 3), Otto (in Minions: The Rise of Gru), and James, Henry, Ed, Dick, and Greg (in Minions & Monsters).

=== Origins ===
The Minions' origin is revealed in the first two Despicable Me films by a poster in Gru's adopted daughters' bedroom, which displays a blueprint of a Minion. An idea was conceived by co-writers Cinco Paul and Ken Daurio that the Minions were created in the laboratory by Gru's genius inventor Dr. Nefario. Paul said that the Minions were cloned from a mutated strand of DNA but thought that depicting their creation would be "too disturbing". He likened Gru to Saruman from The Lord of the Rings, commenting that creating an army was a "classic villain thing". With the development of Minions, the origin story was retconned by giving the Minions a history dating back to the dawn of time. Paul expressed concerns to the creative team but thought it was fun to show their evolution through history. The team decided that the audience would not mind the change and Paul explained the Minions films as "Gru's bedtime stories that he tells the Minions" and by imagining them as "implanted memories so they don't have to face the fact that they were created in a lab."

== Appearances ==
=== Despicable Me films ===
The Minions make their debut in the first Despicable Me film where they inhabit the underground lair beneath the suburban home of a supervillain named Gru. With the help of his elderly assistant named Dr. Nefario, Gru plots various villainous schemes to upstage his rival, Vector. After adopting three orphan girls in order to plant cookie robots, Gru and the Minions infiltrate Vector's fortress to steal back a shrink ray.

In Despicable Me 2, Gru is recruited by the Anti-Villain League to uncover a villain named El Macho at a shopping mall. Additionally he struggles with the challenges of being the father of a teenage daughter. The Minions play a major role in the plot when they are transformed into evil versions after being injected by a serum.

In the third Despicable Me film, Gru and his wife Lucy Wilde are fired from the Anti-Villain League after failing to stop a villain named Balthazar Bratt. He is abandoned by all but two of his Minions, as they decide to leave in search of another boss to serve after Gru refuses to return to being a villain. Gru discovers that he has a twin brother named Dru, while the Minions spend time in prison.

The plot of Despicable Me 4 focuses on Gru and his family being forced to move to a new town and live under different identities when a villain named Maxime le Mal escapes from prison. A group of Minions are given superpowers by the Anti-Villain League and named the Mega Minions.

=== Minions spinoff films ===
The Minions star in their own spinoff film, titled Minions, which charts their evolution through history as they serve various bosses including a T. rex and Napoleon. Three Minions named Kevin, Stuart and Bob embark on a journey to find their next boss and are recruited by Scarlett Overkill, a villain appearing at the 1968 Villain-Con conference, to help her steal the Crown Jewels.

Minions: The Rise of Gru follows on from the previous Minions film. Set in the 1970s, it follows 12-year-old Gru and the Minions as he auditions to join a group of villains named the Vicious 6. His ambitions do not go to plan and he instead decides to outsmart them.

Minions & Monsters centres on the Minions in 1920s Hollywood as they search for creatures to star in a monster movie.

=== Short films ===
Several short films have been produced featuring the Minions. Three mini-movies were included on the Despicable Me DVD and Blu-ray in 2010 titled "Banana", "Home Makeover" and "Orientation Day". Three more mini-movies were included in the 2013 DVD/Blu-ray release of Despicable Me 2, titled "Puppy", "Panic in the Mailroom" and "Training Wheels". The release of Minions in 2015 on Blu-ray and DVD added more mini-movies about the Minions, titled "Cro Minion" and "Competition". In 2016, a short film titled "Mower Minions" was shown before The Secret Life of Pets at CinemaCon. The DVD/Blu-ray release of Despicable Me 3 in 2017 included a mini-movie titled "The Secret Life of Kyle". The DVD/Blu-ray release of The Grinch in 2019 also featured mini movies starring the Minions, titled "Yellow is the New Black" and "Santa's Little Helpers". A short film titled "Minion Scouts" featuring the Minions was also included on the home release of The Secret Life of Pets 2 in 2019. Two more Minions mini-movies titled "Post Modern Minions" and "Minions & Monsters" were released with the home release of Minions: The Rise of Gru in 2022. In 2023, a short film featuring Vector and some Minions titled "Mooned" was shown before Migration in cinemas. An additional mini-movie featuring the Minions titled "Midnight Mission" was included on the film's home release in 2024. The DVD/Blu-ray release of Despicable Me 4 also included two mini-movies titled "Game Over and Over" and "Benny's Birthday".

=== Television special ===
A half-hour compilation of four mini movies aired on November 27, 2020, on NBC titled Minions Holiday Special. The special also included appearances by characters of The Secret Life of Pets and Sing.

=== Animated series ===
An animated web series available on Illumination's Facebook and Instagram was released every Saturday for 40 weeks from 5 June 2021 titled Saturday Morning Minions. Additionally, a short web series titled Who's Who was released on TikTok and YouTube in May 2023.

=== Video games ===
In July 2010, a platform video game titled Despicable Me: The Game was released by D3 Publisher for the PlayStation 2, PlayStation Portable, and Wii, which was based on the first Despicable Me film. It was later released on the Nintendo DS with the title Despicable Me: The Game - Minion Mayhem. A puzzle adventure game titled Despicable Me: Minion Mania was also available in the App store for mobile gameplay. A running spin-off game by Gameloft was released for mobile in 2013 titled Minion Rush. In 2015, a mobile game titled Minions Paradise was released by Electronic Arts and featured a Minion named Phil. On 16 July 2021, the Minions were added to Minecraft as downloadable content alongside other characters from the franchise.

=== Comics ===
In June 2015, a line of comics based on the Minions spin-off film was launched by Titan Comics and made available in comic book stores and digital format.

=== Theme parks ===
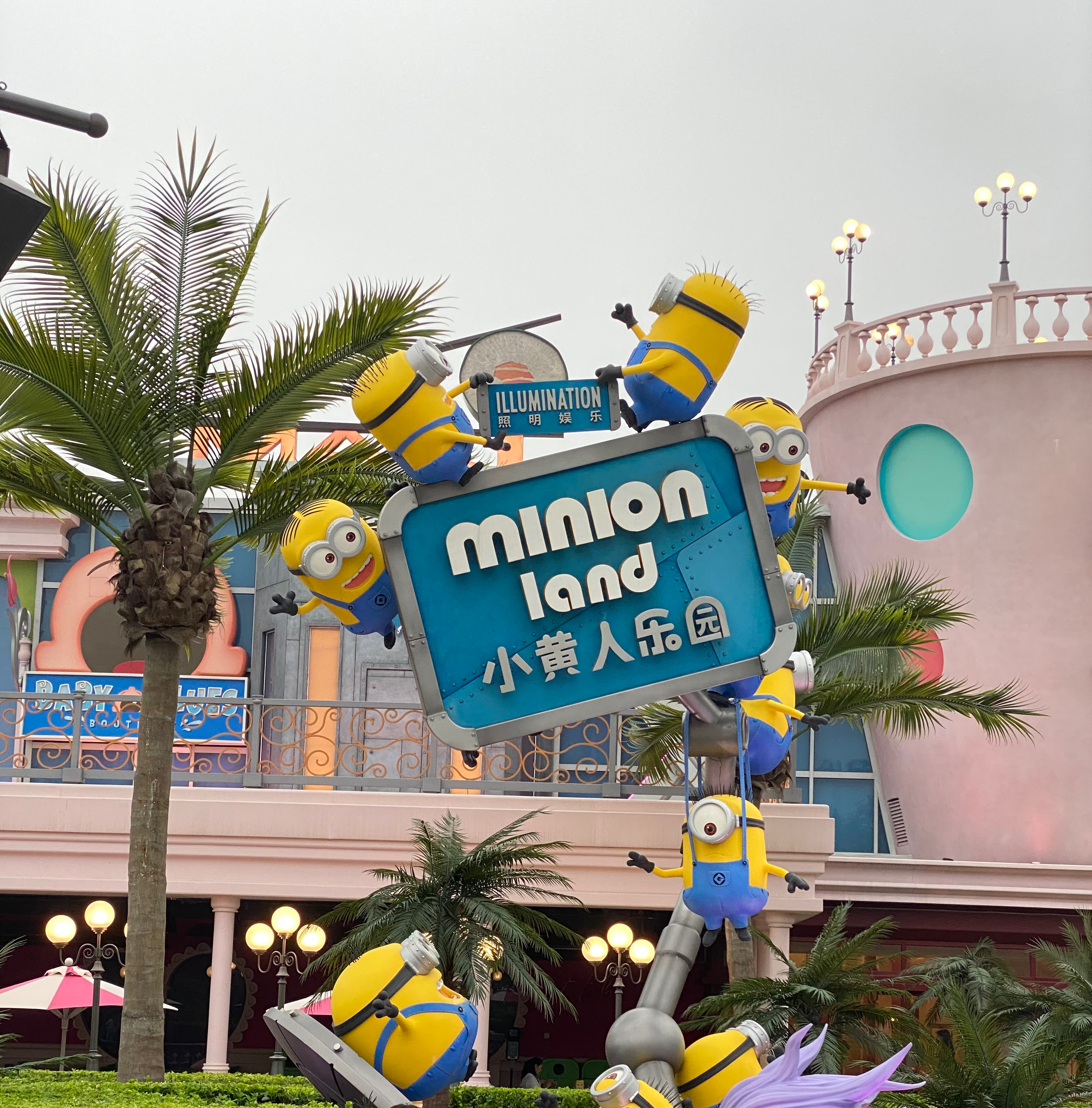
Minion Land at Universal Studios Beijing

The Minions appear in several themed lands and attractions. In 2023, Minion Land opened at Universal Orlando Resort in Florida. The land features the existing Despicable Me Minion Mayhem attraction, a motion simulation ride that opened in 2012, Illumination's Villain-Con Minion Blast, an interactive blaster game, and Minion Café. In 2014, a Despicable Me Minion Mayhem motion simulator ride opened at Universal Studios Hollywood. In 2025, a Minion Land opened at Universal Studios Singapore, featuring a Despicable Me Minion Mayhem ride. Universal Studios Japan includes an expanded Minion Park, featuring Despicable Me: Minion Mayhem, Freeze Ray Sliders and a Villain-Con Minion Blast attraction. Universal Studios Beijing has the largest Minion Land and Minions-themed hotel rooms. Universal Kids Resort in Texas, which opened in 2026, includes a themed land named Illumination's Minions vs. Minions: Bello Bay Club.

== Reception ==
=== Critical response ===
Bryan Alexander of USA Today noted that despite being the protagonist of the first Despicable Me film, Gru had been overshadowed by his own henchmen and they continued to upstage him in the second film. Critical reaction to the Minions has been mixed. Jordan Hoffman of Screencrush thought them to be "adorable", commenting that it is "biologically impossible for a human being not to smile". Carlos Aguilar, writing for TheWrap, recognised the Minions' appeal but found them to be "frantic, infantile and irritating". A Time Out review of the first film labelled them "predictably braindead". Time critic Mary Pols admitted to being resistant to the Minions in the first film but then said she had grown "fond" of them by their second outing. Soren Andersen of The Seattle Times found them to be particularly funny in the third Despicable Me film and considered their scenes to be a welcome break from the rest of the story. In a Time review of the third film, Stephanie Zacharek felt that the Minions were unable to headline their own film and was pleased to see them relegated to the sidelines. Empire reviewer Olly Richards said that although they were not the obvious choice for a lead role, they proved to be funny in Minions. The i Paper critic Geoffrey Macnab described Coffin's voice work as "delightful" in The Rise of Gru, but noted that the Minions become less appealing as the film progresses and are best viewed in small doses. The Minions were praised for their sweetness, their loyalty and for having bodies ideal for physical comedy by Aurora Amidon of Paste.

Brian Moylan of Time noted that the Minions have received some criticism for their lack of diversity and female characters. He rejected this, commenting that they have the potential to be anything and are "harmless, funny creations". A study by Justyna Szklarczyk for the Polish Cultural Institute titled "Bello, Exploitation: On Minion Bondage" considers the Minions' servitude to their master to be reflective of labor in modern global capitalism. In The New York Times, Manohla Dargis appreciated the anarchic nature of the Minions and commented that any criticism of their servitude to their masters through history was pointless due to their ineptness. Rebecca Jennings in Vox also explored the idea that the Minions are "agents of the capitalist machine", being framed as the ideal workforce and made to be perpetually merchandisable. Ryan Gilbey writing for The New Statesman opined that the Minions are the manifestation of Gru's subconscious, as they create havoc while he maintains respectability, and likened them to the children in David Cronenberg's The Brood.

John Gapper writing for the Financial Times said that although they are compliant to Gru, the Minions are compelling and universally appealing because they are always happy, which provides audiences with comedy and reassurance. The Atlantic writer Shirley Li noted that the Minions had gained popularity with multiple generations due to them being "perfect malleable cultural objects" whose appeal lies in "the thrill of participating in Minion behavior". Katie Walsh, in her review of Minions: The Rise of Gru for the Los Angeles Times, said that she found the Minions' rise in film to be "insidious", commenting that they had come to "infiltrate our culture at every level". Cartoon Brew also commented on their popularity, stating that their type of childish humor, specifically their "bumbling gibberish" and clumsiness is easily relatable across cultures. Den of Geek writer Caroline Preece said in a review of the third Despicable Me film that the Minions had become too big for the franchise and that they provide the most humor while the rest of the film felt like filler. Variety critic Peter Debruge said that by the third film the Minions had nothing to do and their antics occur aside from the main plot, despite being the reason for the franchise's commercial success. In a review of the fourth Despicable Me film, Leigh Monson of The A. V. Club opined that the Minions had been "shoehorned" into the film for marketability without having much to do and apart from the Mega Minions are sidelined to a few joke scenes. An IGN review of the fourth film considered them the only aspect that worked well.

=== Accolades ===
Renaud, Coffin and Meledandri were nominated in the category of animated feature film for Despicable Me 2 at the 86th Academy Awards in 2014. Coffin was also recognised for voicing the Minions in 2013 and 2015 with nominations in the category of voice acting in an animated feature production at the Annie Awards. In addition to the first two Despicable Me films, Minions received a nomination for a BAFTA Award for Best Animated Film.

== Impact and influence ==
=== Cultural impact ===
Since the release of the Despicable Me films, the Minions' popularity has grown. The Los Angeles Times reported that their cross-generational appeal was fueled by Facebook memes posted by "online moms" and centered on their humor, cuteness and "blank slate" quality. Calum Marsh writing for The New York Times charted their onscreen rise from their first appearance in Despicable Me as supporting characters to Gru through to their more prominent role in Despicable Me 2 and their eventual starring role as the lead characters of Minions. He considered their humor, mainly slapstick and physical comedy, to be the reason for the international success of the franchise. With the release of Minions: The Rise of Gru, teenage fans following the viral #gentleminions TikTok trend turned up to screenings wearing suits, which resulted in some cinema bans. Wired reported that a #minionscult meme had also gone viral with the aim of taking over TikTok with profile pictures matching the Minions and banana emojis. The Guardian wrote that the Minions have become ubiquitous and that corporate culture has embraced them as an allegory for the modern workforce, as they are often used in LinkedIn posts to provide lessons to employees. Katie Walsh of Star-News said that although they started as supporting characters to Gru, the Minions have since become a "cultural phenomenon". David Sexton writing in The New Statesman praised the Minions' cultural success, saying that the Despicable Me phenomenon was partly due to neoteny, while describing their simplified, cute design as "genius".

=== Corporate mascots ===
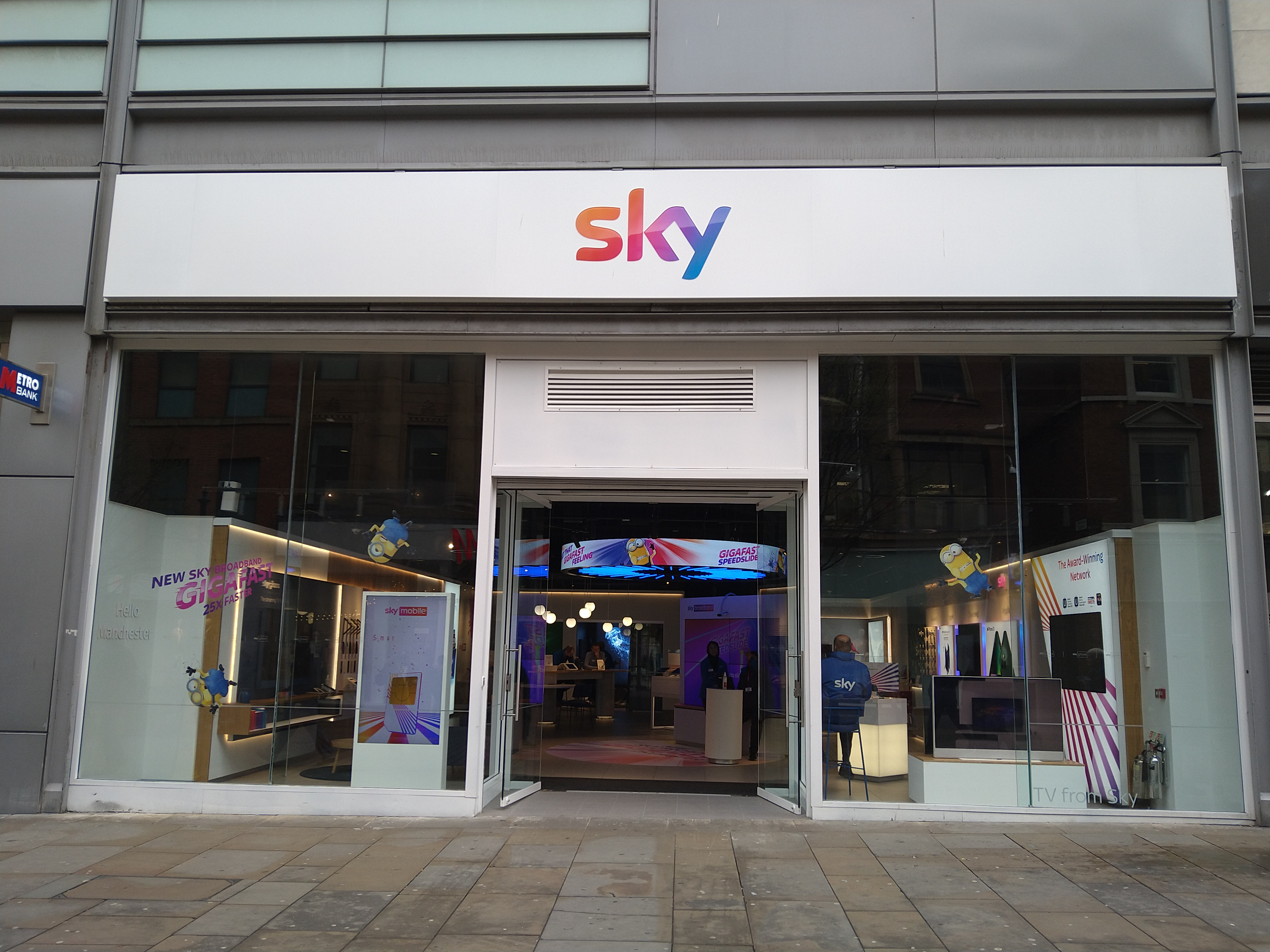
The Minions were advertising mascots for Sky Broadband and Minion decorations could be seen in Sky's retail shops.

The Minions are the official mascots of the Illumination studio. Peter Debruge writing for Variety commented that Illumination was able to compete with major studios like Pixar and DreamWorks despite its restricted budget largely due to the global popularity of the Minions. The Minions' commercial success was highlighted by Time in 2015, reporting that Minions had achieved an estimated $115.2 million in its opening weekend, making it the second-biggest animated opening of all time, beating Toy Story 3 and Shrek 2. By 2024, Deadline reported that the Despicable Me/Minions franchise had achieved $5.025 billion at the global box office, making it the first animated franchise to reach this milestone.

The Minions have been regularly featured in cross-promotions for other Comcast/NBCUniversal properties, including Universal theme parks, NBC primetime TV series, and an Xfinity remote control. From 2022, the Minions featured in adverts for Sky Broadband. Variety reported that since the Minions are the breakout characters of the franchise, they have been placed at the centre of global marketing campaigns by Universal in collaboration with various brands to produce numerous consumer products, including toys and board games.

=== In other media ===
In March 2013, an airship nicknamed Despicablimp with the design of a Minion was launched to promote the release of Despicable Me 2 and was visible in the sky over Los Angeles.

Minion versions of the Simpson family appeared at the end of The Simpsons episode "Treehouse of Horror XXV", which aired on October 19, 2014.

In 2015, the village of Minions, Cornwall in the United Kingdom built a road sign paid for by Universal Studios featuring images of the Minions. In October of that year, they removed it due to safety concerns resulting from people stopping their cars to take photos, although villagers campaigned to get the sign restored.

On April Fool's Day 2016, Google created a button on its Gmail service that sent a "mic drop" along with a GIF image of a Minion. The feature resulted in a backlash involving people complaining about accidentally sending the image during job searches which resulted in job losses. Google removed the feature, citing a bug that caused the image to be sent after hitting the regular send button.

Three statues of Minions appear in Mortal Engines (2018), in which they are assumed to be idols of "ancient deities" from the time before the emergence of traction cities.

A brief cameo by the Minions occurred at the 2024 Summer Olympics opening ceremony. Broadcast viewers saw the characters operate a submarine beneath the Seine while hundreds of competitors passed by.

== See also ==
- List of mascots
- Servbot, a type of yellow childlike henchmen in video games developed and published by Capcom
- Rabbids, a group of wild rabbit-like creatures in video games developed and published by Ubisoft
- Grizzy & the Lemmings features a group of blue lemmings whose most known catchphrase is "Tabodi!"
