= Minions & Monsters =

2026 animated film by Pierre Coffin

- Theatrical release poster
- Directed by: Pierre Coffin
- Screenplay by: Brian Lynch; Pierre Coffin
- Produced by: Chris Meledandri; Bill Ryan
- Starring: Pierre Coffin; Trey Parker; Allison Janney; Christoph Waltz; Jesse Eisenberg; Jeff Bridges; Zoey Deutch; Bobby Moynihan; Phil LaMarr
- Edited by: Gregory Perler
- Music by: John Powell
- Production company: Universal Pictures Illumination
- Distributed by: Universal Pictures
- Release dates: June 21, 2026 (Annecy); July 1, 2026 (United States)
- Running time: 89 minutes
- Country: United States
- Language: English
- Budget: $85 million
- Box office: $531 million

Minions & Monsters is a 2026 American animated comedy film directed by Pierre Coffin, who co-wrote the screenplay with Brian Lynch. Produced by Universal Pictures and Illumination, it is the third installment in the Minions prequel series and the seventh overall installment in the Despicable Me franchise. The film stars Coffin as the Minions, alongside Trey Parker, Allison Janney, Christoph Waltz, Jesse Eisenberg, Jeff Bridges, Zoey Deutch, Bobby Moynihan and Phil LaMarr. Taking place in 1927, between silent film and sound film, 41 years before the events of Minions (2015) and 49 years before the events of Minions: The Rise of Gru (2022), the film follows a group of Minions as they aim to make a monster movie of their own in Old Hollywood.

The film was announced in July 2024, after the release of Despicable Me 4, with Coffin and Lynch returning to direct and write, respectively, and Chris Meledandri producing alongside Bill Ryan. John Powell composed the score, marking his third collaboration with Illumination following The Lorax (2012) and Migration (2023) and the first Despicable Me installment not to be scored by Heitor Pereira.

Minions & Monsters premiered at the Annecy International Animation Film Festival on June 21, 2026, and was theatrically released in the United States on July 1 by Universal Pictures. The film received positive reviews, with many deeming it to be the best in the franchise since the first Despicable Me. It was a box office success, grossing $531 million worldwide and becoming the ninth-highest-grossing film of 2026.

== Plot ==
Thousands of years ago, a tribe of Minions, different from the one that would go on to serve Gru, are on a hunt to serve the world's greatest villains. James, an artistic Minion with a passion for storytelling and drawing, quickly develops a close friendship with two others: Henry, a two-eyed minion who enthusiastically supports James, and Ed, a minion who cannot hear and communicates using sign language and becomes close to them. Among the many masters the Minions serve is a Russian warlock who is killed by a Rabbit monster after Henry summons it from his spell book, which Ed then takes along with them and they inadvertently kill their masters in various ways like a cyclops, a mummy, a pirate, a queen, and an emperor.

Eventually, the tribe stumbles across a bank robbery and decides to chase after the robber to become his henchmen. However, the robber is revealed to be an actor, filming a chase scene for a 1927 movie titled The Good, the Bad and the Stupids. Though filmmaker Max is furious with the Minions, studio executives Frank and Elwood Bright are enamored by their antics. Max hires the Minions to star in his films and soon become a global Phenomenon, appearing in several silent films like Tiny Barbarians with Chainsaws, Look Behind You and Then Down, and They Came from the Stars to Hit You with a Frying Pan! Part Four: Target Miami Beach, and living a glamorous life of Hollywood stardom.

When sound film is introduced, the Minions are unable to adapt to the new technology due to their incomprehensible language. Resulting cuts in of a war film and costing the studio millions in failed material, the Minions are fired and forced to rest in an abandoned factory. Not wanting to give up on his passion for storytelling, James comes up with an idea to make his own movie titled Minions & Monsters, where the Minions would fight against giant monsters. The leader of the tribe, Dick, rejects James's idea and leads the rest of the Minions back towards finding a new evil master, but Henry and Ed break away from them to help James make his film a reality. They pitch it to Max, who encourages James to work on the movie, providing him with a film camera. To help James bring his film to fruition, James uses the warlock's old spell book to summon a Cthulhu monster for the movie. In doing so, the trio releases a small, green monster named Gary Orkam Oliver Magma Ichabod "Goomi" the Deceiver who offers to help him find the perfect monsters for his film, leading them to a frozen fortress at the bering sea, where they free sea monsters Howard the kraken and Phillips the piranha under the false pretense of using them as stars in James's movie. In reality, he aims to use them to summon Irene, a large, orange, multi-eyed blob monster, in order to destroy the world and get revenge.

Meanwhile, Dick and the other Minions are hired by Dort, apparently an alien robot on a mission to invade Earth. While beginning his quest for world domination, Dort falls in love with women's rights activist Debbie, enlisting the Minions' help to romantically pursue her. While James and his crew begin production on his movie, Henry overhears Goomi's plan to Howard and Phillips and tries to alert James, but only for the monsters to kidnap him and convince James to use him as a sacrifice in filming the scene where Irene will be summoned. Just as filming begins, Goomi and the monsters conjure Irene, and she begins wreaking havoc, chasing Henry through the streets in the process.

When Dort and the other Minions witness Irene during his date with Debbie, Dort seemingly flees, leaving the Minions to fend for themselves. Irene succeeds in swallowing Henry, and James drives a milk car through her to rescue him. Greg and the Minions try to destroy Irene, but to no avail. As she repairs herself, Dort reappears with Dick and the other Minions in spacecraft, showing his true identity as an alien robot, and they successfully turn Irene into stone. James and Henry cast an undo spell to send Goomi, Howard and Phillips back with the spell book. The public hails the Minions and Dort as heroes. Ed has captured the entire battle on film, allowing the Minions to complete James's movie. Months later, Minions & Monsters debuts in theaters and receives a standing ovation from the audience while Dort starts a family with Debbie with a toddler robot boy and a baby robot girl.

In a film museum, tour guide Olivia, who tells the story of James and Henry, finishes her story before it is revealed that the entire plot, including the tour, is a film within a film directed by James and Henry. In the mid-credits, the spell book falls into the hands of Gru's Minions and is tested by James, Henry, Kevin, Stuart and Bob, as well as one of Gru's adoptive daughters, Agnes.

== Voice cast ==
- Pierre Coffin as the Minions, including:
  - James, a short, one-eyed and blue-eyed Minion who loves to make art and develops a passion for filmmaking
  - Henry, an average height, two-eyed and blue-eyed Minion who is James's lifelong best friend
  - Ed, a tall, wide, and deaf two-eyed Minion who communicates using sign language
  - Dick, a tall, one-eyed Minion who is the bossy leader of the greater Minion tribe
  - Greg, a very short (formally average height), two-eyed Minion who is Dick's second-in-command
- Allison Janney as Olivia, a tour guide. Janney previously voiced Madge Nelson in the first film.
- Christoph Waltz as Max, a film director who hires the Minions to star in his movies
- Jeff Bridges as Frank and Elwood Bright, twin brothers and the bosses of Bright Brothers Pictures
- Jesse Eisenberg as Dort, a one eyed alien robot that the Minions see as their potential boss. He is a parody of and homage to the character Gort from the 1951 film The Day the Earth Stood Still.
- Trey Parker as Goomi, a small green Cthulhu-resembling monster whose name is short for "Gary Orkam Oliver Magma Ichabod the Deceiver". Parker previously voiced Balthazar Bratt in Despicable Me 3 (2017).
- Zoey Deutch as Debbie, a strong-willed suffragette and Dort's love interest
- Phil LaMarr as Howard, a red tentacled kraken monster freed by Goomi at Alaska. The character is named in homage to writer H. P. Lovecraft
- Bobby Moynihan as Phillips, a blue piscine piranha monster freed by Goomi at Alaska. The character is named in homage to writer H. P. Lovecraft

Additionally, George Lucas makes a cameo appearance as a fictionalized version of himself while Gru, Dr. Nefario, and Agnes make cameos during the credits with archival recording from Steve Carell, Russell Brand and Madison Polan.

== Production ==
=== Development ===
The concept for the film comes from producer Chris Meledandri, who wanted to explore a film where the Minions make a movie with monsters before unleashing them into the world. Meledandri pitched it to veteran director Pierre Coffin who liked the idea despite not intending to direct another film in the franchise after Despicable Me 3. Inspired by his love for old cinema, Coffin decided to set the film in the early days of Hollywood. The reason upon crafting this film is for the studio to go back to its original roots after working on Migration (2023) to follow in a new cinematic direction through a French tradition.

In July 2024, during the release of Despicable Me 4, a third Minions film was announced with Coffin set to direct and reprise his role as the Minions, Brian Lynch to write the script, and Meledandri to produce alongside Bill Ryan whom is the co-president of production at Illumination Studios Paris since Migration (2023) and co-executive produced The Super Mario Bros. Movie (2023) and The Super Mario Galaxy Movie (2026). Patrick Delage, who previously worked on Despicable Me 4 with one of the original directors, Chris Renaud, served as a co-director alongside Coffin after working with him on the Pat & Stan film, The Treasure of Pit and Mortimer, and the "Fraternité" segment that features the Minions for the Paris 2024 Olympics Opening Ceremony.

The film was later announced as Minions & Monsters during the Super Bowl LX, sharing the same title as the 2021 short that aired on NBC on June 11, 2021 and on the DVD release of Minions: The Rise of Gru on September 6, 2022. The film had an estimated $85 million budget.

=== Casting ===
In March 2026, Trey Parker, Jesse Eisenberg, Zoey Deutch, Christoph Waltz, Jeff Bridges, Bobby Moynihan, veteran voice actor Phil LaMarr and Allison Janney were announced to star in the film. Parker had previously voiced Balthazar Bratt in Despicable Me 3 and Janney had voiced Madge Nelson in the first Minions film. In June 2026, filmmaker George Lucas was revealed to have a role after being approached by Meledandri for a potential involvement due to Lucas being an admitted fan of the Despicable Me franchise. According to director Pierre Coffin, the exact collaboration came together quickly after producer Chris Renaud reached out directly to Lucas's wife via text message. Lucas subsequently recorded his brief 15-minute cameo during a visit to the studio in France.

=== Animation and design ===
Animation was provided by Illumination Studios Paris. Due to the monsters being heavily inspired by H.P. Lovecraft, along with the drawings from the warlock’s spell book, the designs of them came from one of the character designers, François Launet, who previously worked as a SFX supervisor at Mac Guff before its animation unit was bought by Illumination in 2011. His nickname, "Goomi," was used for Trey Parker’s character as a Japanese word for ‘garbage’ than just his full name. The characters around Goomi, Howard, Phillips and Eyereen were close to his 2003 ongoing webseries "Goomi’s Unspeakable Vault of Doom" as Launet compares the monsters in the film to his own characters such as Cthulhoo (a mirror to Goomi), Nyarly (a mirror to Howard) and Dagoon (a mirror to Phillips).

=== Music ===
In April 2026, John Powell was announced to be composing the film's score, marking his third collaboration with Illumination following The Lorax (2012) and Migration (2023), as well as the first Despicable Me installment not to be scored by recurring composer Heitor Pereira. Coffin reached out to Powell, with Powell visiting Illumination's Paris office to meet with Coffin and spot the film. Powell remained in Paris for a week to write the musical cues before presenting them to Coffin, who approved, and by April 2026, Powell recorded the score at the Barbra Streisand Scoring Stage within the Sony Pictures Studios lot in California.

Powell noted that his approach to the score for Minions & Monsters was intentionally "indulgent" and different from how he would score "a serious movie", stating that the music can be described as "[o]verly emotional, overwrought, overplayed, overwritten. Just over. Everything was over." Several of the film's musical cues recalled the music of Hollywood's Golden Age, referencing scores by composers Carl Stalling (Looney Tunes), Bernard Herrmann (Psycho), Franz Waxman (Bride of Frankenstein) and Max Steiner (King Kong). Many staff players in his orchestra previously worked on the animated television series Freakazoid! and Animaniacs.

=== Post-production ===
A visual gag involving a clown Minion featured in the film's early promotional trailers was altered for the final theatrical release. In the original version, a red clown nose fell between the Minion's legs in a suggestive manner. Executive producer Chris Renaud requested the scene be changed to avoid potential backlash from parents, and Coffin adjusted the animation so the nose bounced back into the character's face instead.

== Marketing ==
A Super Bowl promo and the official trailer was released and aired on February 8, 2026, during the Super Bowl LX. Footage of the film was showcased in April 2026 during CinemaCon. Wendy's has also started a promotion for the film starting from June 8, 2026, by having a meal and a toy. There is also a frosty that is packaged with the toy. The promotion has no definitive end date, as it will continue as long as supplies last.

=== Merchandise ===
As part of its deal signed in 2023 with Universal Products & Experiences covering the entire Despicable Me franchise, Moose Toys continued its global master toy licensee for the franchise with this film, continuing on from 2024's Despicable Me 4.

== Release ==
=== Theatrical ===
Minions & Monsters premiered at the Annecy International Animation Film Festival on June 21, 2026, and was theatrically released in the United States on July 1 by Universal Pictures. It was originally planned for release on June 30, 2027, but was later moved up to the date previously reserved for DreamWorks Animation's Shrek 5 before that film was postponed. The film debuted on the same opening date as Universal Kids Resort, which includes the Minions-themed land "Minions vs. Minions: Bello Bay Club".

=== Home media ===
On August 4, 2026, Universal Pictures Home Entertainment announced that Minions & Monsters would be released on digital download on August 11, 2026, and was released on 4K Ultra HD Blu-ray, Blu-ray and DVD on September 9, 2026.

== Reception ==
=== Box office ===
Minions & Monsters grossed $183 million in the United States and Canada and $348 million in other territories, for a worldwide total of $531 million. It was produced on an $85 million budget.

In the United States and Canada, Minions & Monsters was initially projected to gross around $80 million from 4,243 theaters over its five-day Independence Day holiday frame. Internationally, projections were around $90 million, for a projected worldwide opening of $170 million. The film opened to $14.2 million on its first day, $37 million by day three, and $62 million over the five-day holiday frame, opening #1 at the box office but marking a franchise-low opening. Compared to Despicable Me 4, the last-numbered installment, and the previous spin-off Minions: The Rise of Gru, which both opened to $120 million and $122 million, respectively, over the same frame, Minions & Monsters was considered to be a "major" disappointment. The poorer-than-usual opening was attributed to America 250 Celebrations driving away ticket sales, competition from Disney and Pixar's Toy Story 5, and "franchise fatigue" from the Despicable Me series, though some outlets expressed optimism of the film's performance over the coming weeks. In its second weekend, the film grossed $21.2 million, dropping 43%, and finished in second place behind Moana. Minions & Monsters finished in fourth place during its third weekend with a gross of $13.6 million, dropping 36%.

=== Critical response ===
Minions & Monsters received positive reviews from critics, with many deeming it the best installment in the franchise since Despicable Me (2010). On the review aggregation website Rotten Tomatoes, 89% of 183 critics' reviews are positive, with an average rating of 6.9/10. The website's consensus reads, "The Minions bring their penchant for mayhem to Hollywood history in this affectionate and charming sendup of moviemaking magic, turning out the franchise's most roundly enjoyable entry yet." It is currently Illumination's highest-rated film on the website. Metacritic, which uses a weighted average, gave the film a score of 70 out of 100, based on 30 critics, indicating "generally favorable" reviews. Audiences polled by CinemaScore gave the film an average grade of "A−" on an A+ to F scale, while 58% of those surveyed by PostTrak said they would definitely recommend the film.

Drew Taylor of TheWrap called the film "a love letter to classic Hollywood" and "builds to an open-hearted tribute to the power of the communal moviegoing experience", while Guy Lodge of Variety described it as "smarter, wilder and funnier before the monsters enter the equation", is "fully, madly moviosa", and that it was a "mostly delightful" entry. John Nugent of Empire gave the film three out of five stars, concluding: "It is goofy and giggly and resolutely wedded to stupidity. There's little attempt to add much depth to the story, in the way that Pixar might try to—it is essentially, once again, just a series of contrived opportunities for the little guys to get up to chaotic mischief."

Clint Worthington, writing for RogerEbert.com, gave Minions & Monsters three and a half out of four stars, stating that despite the less compelling second half of the film, it manages to be "the snappiest, most cohesive, and entertaining entry in this [Minions] series to date", and concluded that the film "feels like Coffin interrogating the Minions' place in the annals of film history. ... He argues, and here successfully, that the Minions aren't a scourge of the universal loss of attention span and cultural sophistication. Rather, these little guys are simply the purest and latest distillation of the very impulses that have made cinema one of mankind's most enduring art forms: characters in motion, working hard to entertain, distract, and provide a communal experience for those who enjoy them." Eric Goldman of IGN gave the film a grade of 8 out of 10, concluding: "Using the Minions to create an ode to early Hollywood that's also an overall love letter to movies themselves and the power of storytelling is a surprising yet welcome turn of events."

=== Accolades ===
Award	Date of ceremony	Category	Recipient(s)	Result	Ref.
Nickelodeon Kids' Choice Awards	November 14, 2026	Favorite Animated Movie	Minions & Monsters	Nominated	
