= Gru =

Despicable Me character

- Despicable Me character
- Artwork of Gru from Despicable Me 4 (2024)
- First appearance: Despicable Me (2010)
- Created by: Sergio Pablos
- Designed by: Chris Renaud; Pierre Coffin
- Voiced by: Steve Carell

In-universe information
- Full name: Felonious Gru Sr.
- Occupation: Supervillain; Jelly manufacturer; Agent of the Anti-Villain League
- Weapon: Freeze Ray; Shrink Ray; Inflation Gun; Fart Gun; Zapp Lipstick Taser; Jelly Gun; Flamethrower; Big Blaster Cannon; Laser Gun; Sticky Fingers; Cheese Ray
- Family: Marlena Gru (mother); Robert Gru (father); Dru Gru (twin brother)
- Spouse: Lucy Wilde
- Children: Margo, Edith, and Agnes Gru (adopted daughters); Felonious Gru Jr. (son)
- Nationality: American

Felonious Gru Sr., typically referred to by just his surname Gru, is a fictional character and the protagonist of Illumination's Despicable Me franchise. He first appeared in Despicable Me (2010) and has appeared in all seven films in the franchise. He is voiced by American actor and comedian Steve Carell. Based on a Dracula-like concept character pitched by animator Sergio Pablos, he was shaped by directors Chris Renaud and Pierre Coffin into a character more like a James Bond villain.

Gru is a grouchy, quick-witted, and cynical supervillain and the boss of the Minions, who also serves as a secret agent in order to fight other supervillains. His adoption of three orphan girls named Margo, Edith and Agnes propels his story arc from malevolent supervillain to reformed parent.

== Characteristics ==
Felonius Gru is a supervillain whose ambitions include masterminding evil deeds, such as stealing the Moon. He is bald, top-heavy, has a sharp and long beak nose and wears a black coat and a scarf. Despite his wicked motives, he is largely inept and often resorts to petty acts of villainy. His suburban home is built above a secret lair, inhabited by his Minions.

In Despicable Me, Gru is preoccupied with being the greatest villain of all time. His ambitions are influenced by his mother, who sometimes ridicules him. With the help of his genius inventor Dr. Nefario, he is able to employ a variety of weapons to carry out his wicked plans, such as his Insta-Freeze Gun or his Shrink Ray. In addition to his Minions, Gru has a small, sharp-toothed dog named Kyle. His prickly, quick-tempered personality softens after adopting three orphan girls, named Margo, Edith, and Agnes.

Gru's family is extended in subsequent films. In Despicable Me 2, when recruited as an agent by the Anti-Villain League (AVL), he meets Lucy Wilde, who becomes his love interest. In Despicable Me 3, he meets his long-lost evil twin brother, Dru. In the fourth Despicable Me film, he is the biological father of a baby named Gru Jr.

== Concept and creation ==
=== Development ===
The character that would become Gru was conceived by animator Sergio Pablos, who pitched the idea for "Evil Me" centred around an evil mastermind named Groo. He envisioned him as a Dracula-like character, but the directors of the first film, Chris Renaud and Pierre Coffin, later opted for a more sleek character that would echo "the world of James Bond", with Auric Goldfinger being cited as a particular influence. Originally Gru was much more evil than in the final film and the creative team struggled to get his character right. Coffin said that eventually they found ways to make him "evil but very charming". His "ogre-like henchmen" evolved into silly child-like characters named Minions, which helped to make Gru more likeable to audiences. Cinco Paul and Ken Daurio wrote the script for the first film. Paul said that they tried to find evil moments that made the audience root for Gru, such as using his Freeze Ray to skip the line at Starbucks, and so they depicted him as a normal person who is trying to be a villain.

Producer and founder of Illumination Entertainment, Chris Meledandri, said that the second film was driven by the success of the first but wanted to ensure that the sequel would be approached creatively. He considered Gru to be an appealing character because he is damaged and felt that this added more depth to the Despicable Me films especially for adult viewers. For Despicable Me 2, Gru was still given moments to be evil but on a different level. Daurio said that he does "the things we wish we could do", such as spraying an annoying neighbour with water. Meledandri wanted to see how the challenges of fatherhood would affect Gru's character. Coffin said that it was important for Gru to remain constant even though he is working for the "good guys" at the Anti-Villain League, citing a tradition in French comic books in which characters evolve but remain the same. The creative team thought that Lucy's positive, lively personality would create a contrast to Gru, as a loner and an unsociable person, so they felt it was important to develop their relationship. Initially, Lucy was treated as an annoyance for Gru, but they thought it would be interesting to explore the emotional side of his character, so decided to make her his girfriend. Additionally, they wanted to tackle some of their own issues with fatherhood, so introduced a subplot involving Margot dating a boy. For the film's villain, they created a very macho character due to feeling that Gru had been feminized by adopting three girls.

During the development of Despicable Me 3, the creative team struggled to decide how to progress Gru due to him no longer being a supervillain. They decided to give him a midlife crisis and the potential at trying villainy after meeting his long-lost brother, Dru. Designer Eric Guillon designed Dru with long hair and a white outfit to contrast with Gru's black clothing. Co-director Kyle Balda described Dru as the "polar-opposite" to Gru whom he defined as a "dark cloud". Gru's relationship with his brother shifted from a fascination with each other to rivalry and eventually to mentor. Balda said that Gru's story arc was the anchor for the Despicable Me series. The team decided to challenge his confidence, make him vulnerable and offer the temptation of returning to being a villain. Meledandri explained that the emotional core of the story is Gru's rivalry with his brother, who is charming in contrast to Gru's bad-tempered personality. The creative team used an exaggerated style, similar to Buster Keaton films, to reinforce the relationship Gru has with his brother, particularly in a sequence where they overact to play the role of each other.

For Despicable Me 4, the creative team began by focusing the story on Gru and his family having to relocate from their home and go into a witness relocation program. Screenwriter Mike White was brought onboard to write the drafts that eventually formed the story. They introduced a new villain named Maxime Le Mal who is also Gru's high school rival. Renaud said that this storyline provided the opportunity to show Gru when he was in high school. They also added Gru Jr. to explore how Gru copes with a six-month-old baby. Renaud said that the very first scene in which Gru interacts with a baby who does not like him creates humor but also helps to keep the characters relatable to the audience.

=== Voice ===
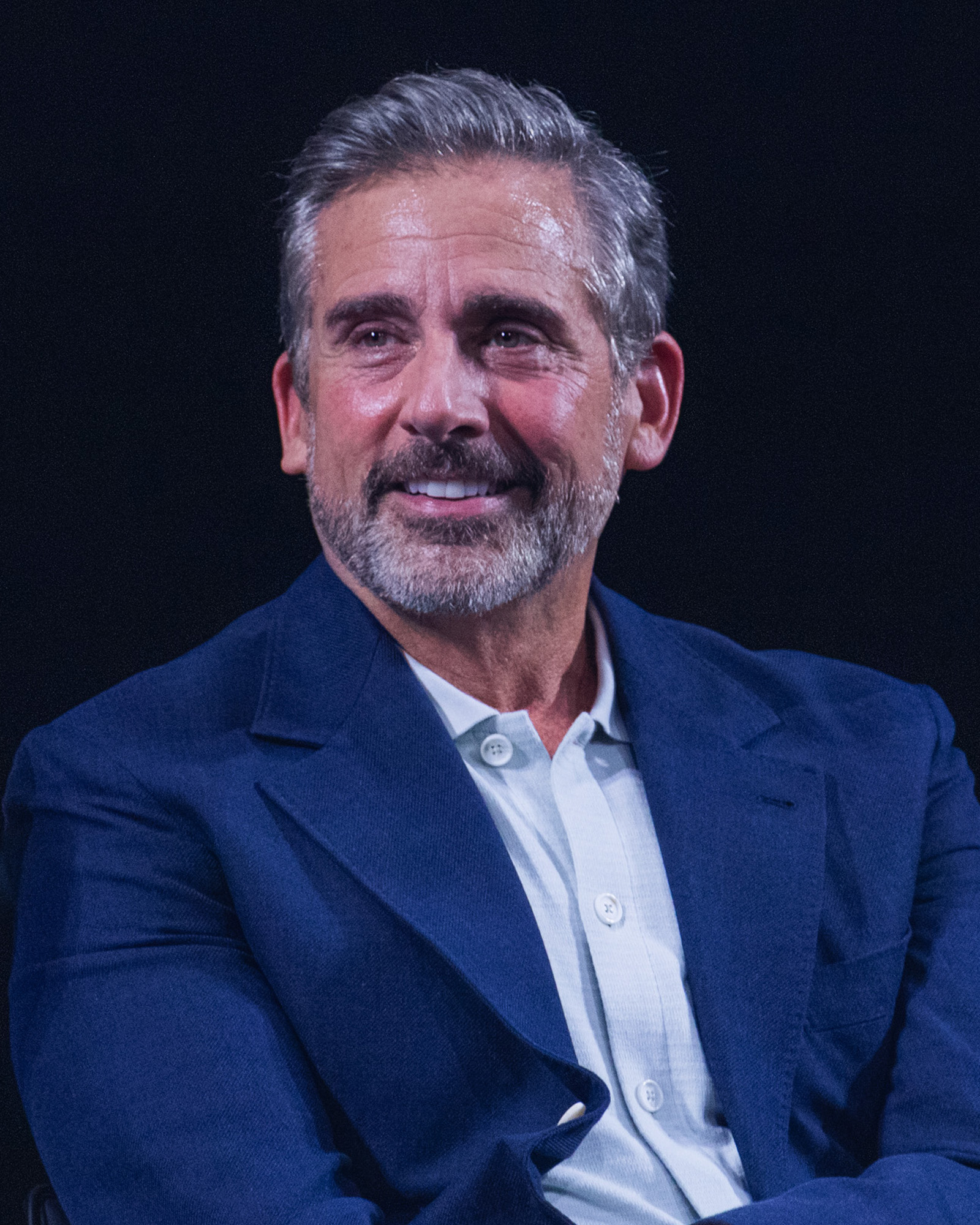
Steve Carell is the voice of Gru in the Despicable Me film franchise.

Renaud said that early in development Gru nearly had a French accent, as one early inspiration for the character was Peter Sellers as Inspector Clouseau. Gru's distinctive accent, described as "quasi-Russian" by A. O. Scott and "halfway between a Russian mafioso and a crazed Nazi" by Roger Ebert, was largely a product of his voice actor Steve Carell's experimentation. According to Meledandri, the voice Carell eventually settled on was conceived as "halfway between Ricardo Montalbán and Bela Lugosi". Carell said that Gru has no real accent, describing it as a combination of "every middle European country in the world, plus a little Latin America, and maybe some French". Initially, when Gru had a darker design in the original concept art, he tried to match the voice by making it "vaguely menacing" but also "approachable". He tested different voices with his children, before choosing the one that made them laugh. He also had some influence in shaping Gru's character. When Meledandri expressed concerns about the extent of Gru's villainy at the start of Despicable Me and asked the directors to make him less despicable, Carell argued that his villainy was necessary for the emotional impact of his relationship with the three adopted girls to work later in the film. Carell said that he could relate to his character, because he thought that Gru cared about being a good parent, and he felt that this made him "a good role model". In the third Despicable Me film, Carell voiced both Gru and his twin brother, Dru. For Minions: The Rise of Gru, Carell took on the challenge of voicing a younger Gru. He described his performance as: "a little more earnest, voice a bit higher, a little squeakier, a little less composed, but very much the same guy". He explained that while young Gru is excited, earnest and higher pitched, adult Gru is "a little more weary and a little more crusty and a little more reserved".

== Appearances ==
=== Despicable Me films ===
At the beginning of the first film (2010), Gru is an ambitious supervillain who constantly seeks approval from his mother. He is undermined by his rival, Vector, who steals the Great Pyramid from Giza. With the intention of becoming the greatest villain, he plans to steal the moon by using a Shrink Ray. To further his evil plan, he adopts three orphan girls, who eventually reform his character.

In the second film (2013), Gru leaves his villainous past behind to care for his adoptive daughters. He spends his time launching a range of jams and jellies, which causes Dr. Nefario to resign. Gru is recruited by Lucy Wilde, an agent at the Anti-Villain League, to help uncover a supervillain at a local shopping mall. Eventually he discovers that the supervillain is a Mexican restaurant owner named El Macho.

In the third film (2017), he and his wife, Lucy, are fired from their jobs at the Anti-Villain League due to failing to stop a supervillain named Balthazar Bratt. Gru learns that he has a twin brother named Dru. Along with Lucy and the girls, he meets Dru at his mansion and they form a brotherly relationship, in which Dru attempts to drag Gru back into a life of villainy.

In the fourth film (2024), Gru and his family, which includes his baby son named Gru Jr., are forced to move to a new town and assume different identities after a villain named Maxime Le Mal, who has harboured a high school hatred for Gru, escapes from prison.

=== Minions spin-off films ===
Gru's yellow henchmen star in their own spin-off film titled Minions (2015). The film acts as an origin story for the Minions and is a prequel to the events of Despicable Me, but Gru makes an appearance as a young boy destined to become a supervillain.

Minions: The Rise of Gru (2022) serves as an origin story for Gru and continues events from the previous film. At the age of 12, Gru auditions to become a member of a group of villains named the Vicious 6, but his ambitions do not go to plan and he is forced to outsmart them.

=== Theme parks ===
Gru appears in the Despicable Me Minion Mayhem attraction, which opened on July 2, 2012 at Universal Orlando Resort.

=== Other ===
Gru, portrayed by Steve Carell wearing a bald cap, prosthetic make up and a bulky costume to resemble his animated depiction, appeared as an interview guest on a 30 May 2013 episode of The Ellen DeGeneres Show. Although Carell's appearance was to promote Despicable Me 2, Carell stayed and fielded questions in character as Gru for the interview.

== Reception ==
=== Critical response ===
Simon Abrams writing for Slant appreciated Gru in Despicable Me, stating that his characterisation as an "egomaniac who toils away on various underachieving schemes" is perfectly established. Emmy Snider of The Michigan Daily praised Gru's character development stating that he is neither a hero nor a true villain, rather he "defies the binaries of hero and villain" and is just someone looking for love. Roger Ebert found the film refreshing and "daring" for being an animated comedy that focuses on an anti-hero rather than a young hero. The use of flashbacks to characterise Gru in Despicable Me was favourably compared by Peter Debruge of Variety to those used in Pixar's 2007 film Ratatouille to characterise Anton Ego. Anthony Quinn wrote in The Independent that he found Gru's transformation into a father to be implausible. Empire critic Kim Newman found Gru's story arc to becoming a parent to be hilarious but also poignant. Peter Bradshaw of The Guardian did not find Gru as interesting as other villains in animated films. Los Angeles Times film critic Kenneth Turan accused the film's title of false advertising, stating that Gru's villainous story arc ends in "sappy sentimentality". A review in Time Out remarked on the strong characterisation in Despicable Me, describing Gru as a "family-friendly baddie" but noting Carell's "bizarre mittel-European accent".

Gru was cited by Katy Marriner, writing in Screen Education, as one of the premier examples of a protagonist in an animated film who reforms themself, in contrast to the traditional animated film protagonist who remains heroic throughout. Gru was psychologically analysed by Nofika Dewi of Universitas Pamulang, who found that his rude and ambitious qualities represented his Id; his villainy and tenaciousness represented his Ego, while his competence as a parent and bravery were part of his Super-ego. Gru was interpreted as a Russian stereotype in a 2017 study suggesting that elements of his characterisation had been designed to support anti-Russian sentiment in the United States. Tara Bennett of Syfy wrote an ode to Gru, citing him as a model of paternity based on his story arc from supervillain into a dedicated father. In an Empire review of the second film, Helen O'Hara noted that the Minions had been given a more prominent role and she thought this was unfair to Gru. She opined that with a stronger plot, he was capable of becoming a film icon. Simon Reynolds of Digital Spy agreed that Gru had been overshadowed by his henchmen in the second film and that his character progression was less clear.

IndieWire critic Kate Erbland felt that Gru's problems remain unchanged in the third film. She said he is still struggling to be successful and thought the plot was recycled from previous films. IGN writer Alex Welch enjoyed the dance fights between Gru and Balthazar Bratt and thought their interactions were hilarious, but found Gru's moments with Dru to be superfluous. Justin Chang of the Los Angeles Times described Gru's story arc as a "tiresome Manichaean struggle" and called the plotline about finding his long lost twin brother "lame". In Peter Debruge's review of The Rise of Gru for Variety, he commented that he had grown tired of Gru's "bad-guy-gone-soft shtick" and felt that the franchise needed to give Gru the chance to be evil again. The i Paper critic Geoffrey Mcnab found young Gru's villainy to be "alarming" instead of comedic. The Hollywood Reporter writer Frank Scheck said that young Gru was "endearing" despite his villainy and praised Carell's voice. Jake Coil of AP News commented that Gru had again been overshadowed by his Minions in The Rise of Gru despite the film being his origin story.

=== Accolades ===
For voicing Gru, Carell was nominated in 2010 at the 38th Annual Annie Awards for Despicable Me. In 2013, he was nominated for an Annie Award for Despicable Me 2. In 2011, he was nominated for his role of Gru in the category of Favorite Butt-kicker at the Kids' Choice Awards. In the 2014 Kids' Choice Awards he was nominated in the category of Favorite Voice From an Animated Movie. In 2023, he was also nominated for a Kids' Choice Award in the category of Favorite Voice from an Animated Movie (Male) for The Rise of Gru. In 2025, he was nominated for voicing Gru in Despicable Me 4 at the Kids' Choice Awards in the category of Favorite Male Voice from an Animated Movie. Carell was also nominated for a Teen Choice Award in 2013 for Despicable Me 2.
