= Despicable Me =

Illumination media franchise

- Official logo used since 2010
- Created by: Sergio Pablos
- Original work: Despicable Me (2010)
- Owners: Illumination; Universal Pictures
- Years: 2010–present

Films and television
- Film(s): Main series: Despicable Me (2010); Despicable Me 2 (2013); Despicable Me 3 (2017); Despicable Me 4 (2024); Prequel series: Minions (2015); Minions: The Rise of Gru (2022); Minions & Monsters (2026)
- Short film(s): Despicable Me short films
- Web series: Despicable Me digital series
- Television special(s): Minions Holiday Special (2020)

Games
- Video game(s): Despicable Me video games

Audio
- Soundtrack(s): Despicable Me; Despicable Me 2; Minions; Despicable Me 3; Minions: The Rise of Gru; Despicable Me 4; Minions & Monsters

Miscellaneous
- Theme park attraction(s): Despicable Me Minion Mayhem (2012–present); Illumination's Villain-Con Minion Blast (2023–present); Bello Bay Cruise (2026–present); Bello Bay Golf Cart Derby (2026–present)

Despicable Me is an American media franchise created by Sergio Pablos. It centers on a supervillain turned secret agent named Gru, his adoptive daughters, Margo, Edith, and Agnes, and his yellow-colored Minions. The franchise is produced by Illumination and distributed by its parent company Universal Pictures.

The franchise began with the 2010 film of the same name, which was followed by three sequels, Despicable Me 2 (2013), Despicable Me 3 (2017), and Despicable Me 4 (2024). Three spin-off prequels based on the Minions have also been released, including the 2015 film of the same name, Minions: The Rise of Gru (2022), and Minions & Monsters (2026). The films have received mixed reviews from critics. As of 2026, the franchise is the thirteenth highest-grossing media franchise and, with a total global box-office revenue of over US$6 billion, the highest-grossing animated franchise of all time, surpassing Shrek in 2017. The films have set numerous box-office records, with Despicable Me 3 and Minions each grossing over $1 billion and being among the highest-grossing films at the time of their release.

The franchise also includes short films, a television special, several video games, and a theme park attraction.

== Feature films ==
Film	Release date	Directed by	Screenplay by	Story by	Produced by
Main series
Despicable Me	July 9, 2010	Chris Renaud and Pierre Coffin	Cinco Paul and Ken Daurio	Sergio Pablos	Chris Meledandri, John Cohen and Janet Healy
Despicable Me 2	July 3, 2013	Chris Renaud and Pierre Coffin	Cinco Paul and Ken Daurio	Cinco Paul and Ken Daurio	Chris Meledandri and Janet Healy
Despicable Me 3	June 30, 2017	Pierre Coffin and Kyle Balda	Cinco Paul and Ken Daurio	Cinco Paul and Ken Daurio	Chris Meledandri and Janet Healy
Despicable Me 4	July 3, 2024	Chris Renaud	Mike White and Ken Daurio	Mike White and Ken Daurio	Chris Meledandri and Brett Hoffman
Prequel series
Minions	July 10, 2015	Pierre Coffin and Kyle Balda	Brian Lynch	Brian Lynch	Chris Meledandri and Janet Healy
Minions: The Rise of Gru	July 1, 2022	Kyle Balda	Matthew Fogel	Brian Lynch and Matthew Fogel	Chris Meledandri, Janet Healy and Chris Renaud
Minions & Monsters	July 1, 2026	Pierre Coffin	Brian Lynch and Pierre Coffin	Brian Lynch and Pierre Coffin	Chris Meledandri and Bill Ryan

=== Main series ===
==== Despicable Me (2010) ====
Longtime supervillain Gru formulates a plan to steal the Moon after a younger villain named Vector steals the Great Pyramid of Giza. As part of his plan, he adopts three orphan girls, and eventually finds himself split on where his commitments lie.

Despicable Me debuted at the Annecy International Animated Film Festival on June 9, 2010, and was released in the United States on July 9.

==== Despicable Me 2 (2013) ====
Secret agent Lucy Wilde recruits Gru to investigate the theft of a powerful mutagen by El Macho, a supervillain who pursues world domination.

Despicable Me 2 debuted in Australia on June 5, 2013, and was released in the United States on July 3.

==== Despicable Me 3 (2017) ====
Gru teams up with his long-lost twin brother Dru to stop Balthazar Bratt, a former child actor of the 1980s, from destroying Hollywood, Los Angeles, after his show was canceled years ago.

Despicable Me 3 debuted at the Annecy International Animated Film Festival on June 14, 2017, and was theatrically released in the United States on June 30.

==== Despicable Me 4 (2024) ====
Gru, who is now raising a baby, faces Maxime Le Mal and his girlfriend Valentina, two villains who seek revenge on Gru and his family, forcing the family to go on the run.

Despicable Me 4 debuted in New York City on June 9, 2024, and was released in the United States on July 3.

=== Prequel series ===
==== Minions (2015) ====
Logo of Minions series

The Minions search for their replaceable evil master after, one-by-one, accidentally killing all their past leaders throughout history.

Minions debuted in London on June 11, 2015, and was released in the United States on July 10.

==== Minions: The Rise of Gru (2022) ====
An eleven-year-old Gru plans to become a supervillain with the help of his Minions, which leads to a showdown with a malevolent team, the Vicious 6.

Minions: The Rise of Gru debuted at the Annecy International Animation Film Festival on June 13, 2022, and was released in the United States on July 1.

==== Minions & Monsters (2026) ====
A group of Minions aims to make a monster movie of their own in Old Hollywood.

Minions & Monsters debuted at the Annecy International Animation Film Festival on June 21, 2026, and was released in the United States on July 1, after initially being set for release on June 30, 2027.

== Short films ==
A total of 20 short films have been released in the franchise. Three short films based on Despicable Me were released in December 2010 on the film's DVD and Blu-ray. The Despicable Me 2 DVD and Blu-ray, released in December 2013, included another three short films. Three short films were released in 2015 on the Blu-ray and DVD of Minions, while one short film was released in the Blu-ray and DVD of Despicable Me 3.

A short film titled Mower Minions was released in 2016 with The Secret Life of Pets, being the first short film to be released theatrically. A second theatrical short film was released in 2018 with The Grinch, while another one was released in The Grinch's DVD and Blu-ray. A third theatrical short film was released in 2023 with Migration. Two new shorts were released in Despicable Me 4 on digital HD release.

=== Home Makeover (2010) ===
Released on the Despicable Me DVD and Blu-ray.

After the events of Despicable Me, the Minions help Margo, Edith, and Agnes renovate Gru's house so a social worker does not take the girls back to Miss Hattie's Home for Girls.

=== Orientation Day (2010) ===
Released on the Despicable Me DVD and Blu-ray.

Three Minions now have jobs as bomb transporters, but things go wrong when the trio has an argument with two other Minions who carry a bomb bigger than theirs.

=== Banana (2010) ===
Released on the Despicable Me DVD and Blu-ray.

Three Minions fight over a banana. In the process, they wreak havoc in the Minions' workplace.

=== Puppy (2013) ===
Released on the Despicable Me 2 DVD and Blu-ray.

A Minion watches neighbors walking their dogs on the street, which leads him to search for a puppy of his own. After several failed attempts, he comes across a UFO that takes the role of a puppy for him.

=== Panic in the Mailroom (2013) ===
Released on the Despicable Me 2 DVD and Blu-ray.

Two Minions work sending parcels through the lab. When a package containing expired PX-41 (the serum that El Macho used to transform the Minions and himself in Despicable Me 2), gets jammed in the pneumatic delivery system, it transforms one of them into an evil Minion.

=== Training Wheels (2013) ===
Released on the Despicable Me 2 DVD and Blu-ray.

Agnes is unsatisfied with her toy bike after falling off it while attempting to catch up to an ice cream truck with Margo, Edith, and their friends. Three Minions then volunteer to modify the bike and help Agnes improve her skills.

=== Cro Minion (2015) ===
Released on the Minions DVD and Blu-ray.

Two caveman Minions look after a cave baby while their boss goes to find a bull to eat for lunch. But it is harder than the Minions think.

=== Competition (2015) ===
Released on the Minions DVD and Blu-ray.

Two Minions challenge themselves to numerous attacks, ending up on the lab's conveyor belt in the process.

=== Binky Nelson Unpacified (2015) ===
Released on the Minions DVD and Blu-ray.

The Nelsons' youngest son Binky, having lost his pacifier after a successful robbery at a museum, sets out on a mission to retrieve it. Notably, it is the first mini-movie to not star the Minions or feature them in any capacity.

=== Mower Minions (2016) ===
Released theatrically with The Secret Life of Pets (2016).

A group of Minions try to earn some money by mowing a lawn at a local old people's home, but their work results turn out to be chaotic.

=== The Secret Life of Kyle (2017) ===
Released on the Despicable Me 3 DVD and Blu-ray.

After the events of Despicable Me 3, we follow Kyle and his secret life when Gru and his family are gone.

=== Yellow is the New Black (2018) ===
Released theatrically with The Grinch (2018).

Before they all make their big escape from prison in Despicable Me 3, a couple of lucky Minions get a taste of freedom as they break free with the help of one of their fellow human inmates.

=== Santa's Little Helpers (2019) ===
Released on The Grinch DVD and Blu-ray.

Kevin, Stuart, and Bob, having been accidentally dropped off at the North Pole, make the most of the situation by trying to become elves.

=== Minion Scouts (2019) ===
Released on The Secret Life of Pets 2 DVD and Blu-ray.

When Margo, Agnes and Edith return from a scout camp, a group of Minions are entranced by the girls' merit badges and become scouts in an attempt to earn badges for themselves.

=== Minions & Monsters (2021) ===
Aired on NBC on June 11, 2021, and included in the Minions: The Rise of Gru DVD and Blu-ray.

A rookie Minion joins other Minions in a tabletop role-playing game.

=== Post Modern Minion (2022) ===
Released on the Minions: The Rise of Gru DVD and Blu-ray.

When a Minion crashes into an art gallery, an art critic praises his creation and he becomes an overnight celebrity.

=== Mooned (2023) ===
Released theatrically with Migration (2023).

Taking place right after the ending of the first film, Vector Perkins, still stuck on the Moon, attempts to escape and return to Earth.

=== Midnight Mission (2024) ===
Released on the Migration 4K Ultra HD Blu-ray, DVD and Blu-ray.

A trio of Minions will try anything to help Agnes overcome her fear of the dark, even if it involves going into outer space.

=== Game Over and Over (2024) ===
Released on the Despicable Me 4 digital platforms.

When Stuart accidentally destroys his controller in anger, he finds another controller in Gru's lab to replay his game. But instead he controls Kevin, so Stuart decides to play him as his game and try to beat his high score.

=== Benny's Birthday (2024) ===
Released on the Despicable Me 4 digital platforms.

It's Benny's birthday, and the Minions take him to his cake. Benny has a time loop of being injured and hurt on his birthday, from getting blown by TNT to being hit by a bat.

== Other media ==
=== Television specials ===
==== Minions Holiday Special (2020) ====
The first TV special, Minions Holiday Special, is a half-hour compilation of Minions mini-movies, containing Santa's Little Helpers, Training Wheels, Puppy, and Minion Scouts. Additionally, the special includes holiday-themed interstitials featuring characters from Illumination's The Secret Life of Pets and Sing franchises. The special aired on NBC on November 27, 2020.

Miranda Cosgrove, who voices Margo in the films, provides narration between the short segments.

=== Digital series ===
Saturday Morning Minions is a comedy slapstick cartoon. It debuted in the United States on Illumination's social media on June 9, 2021, released weekly on Saturdays, and consists of 40 episodes. The series features a 2D animation style. Who's Who was released on TikTok and subsequently on YouTube.

== Outside media ==
=== Video games ===
The video game, titled Despicable Me: The Game, was released for the PlayStation 2, PlayStation Portable, and Wii. A Nintendo DS version was released under the name Despicable Me: The Game – Minion Mayhem. Namco also released on July 6, 2010, a version for the iPhone, iPad and iPod Touch platform entitled Despicable Me: Minion Mania, developed by Anino Games. The game was removed from the App Store on January 1, 2013.

The action video game, initially titled Despicable Me: Minion Rush, retitled in 2018 to simply Minion Rush, was released on June 13, 2013. The game, developed by Gameloft Barcelona and editing by the French group Gameloft, was adapted for iPhone, iPad, Apple TV, Android, and Windows Phone devices. Played as one of the Minions, it allows customization of the character, who must perform various tasks, including defeating Vector and a new villain created for the game, to earn the title of Minion of the Year. The game was downloaded more than 100 million times in the first three months after its release. The game won a British Academy Children's Award in the category BAFTA's Kids' Vote and a Kids' Choice Award for Favorite App. By June 2021, the game hit 1 billion downloads worldwide across iOS, Android, and other devices. On September 25, 2026, it was announced that the game would be removed from app stores on October 30, 2026, with the online servers shutting down on January 29, 2027. Offline features will remain accessible after this date for users who already have the game downloaded.

The free-to-play mobile game developed by Electronic Arts (otherwise known as EA), titled Minions Paradise, was released in the summer of 2015. Playing as Phil, players will help Minions design and build their own utopia set in a tropical environment. The game was removed from the App Store on May 22, 2017.

=== Theme park attractions ===
Despicable Me Minion Mayhem is a simulator ride that opened on July 2, 2012, at Universal Studios Florida and on April 12, 2014, at Universal Studios Hollywood, starring Steve Carell as Gru, Miranda Cosgrove as Margo, Dana Gaier as Edith, Elsie Fisher as Agnes, and Pierre Coffin as the Minions. The same attraction (featuring Japanese and Mandarin voice casts) opened on April 21, 2017, at Universal Studios Japan and September 20, 2021, at Universal Studios Beijing. Another version of the attraction, built as part of Minion Land, opened on February 14, 2025, at Universal Studios Singapore.

In addition to the Minion Mayhem attraction, Universal Studios Florida features an entire Minion Land with a moving-walkway shooter attraction titled Villain-Con: Minion Blast. The Minion Blast attraction is also featured at Universal Studios Japan.

In 2026, Universal Kids Resort features a themed land based on the Despicable Me franchise, known as Minions vs Minions: Bello Bay Club. The area contains a river rapids ride.

== Characters ==
=== Main characters ===
- Felonious Gru Sr. (voiced by Steve Carell): The protagonist in the Despicable Me series who speaks with an Eastern European accent. He is the son of Marlena and Robert, the twin brother of Dru, the adoptive father of Margo, Edith, and Agnes; the husband of Lucy, and the boss of the Minions. At the beginning of the first film, Gru is an ambitious supervillain who constantly seeks approval from his mother, until the adoption of his daughters convinces him that their happiness is important. In the second film, Gru leaves his villainous past behind to care for his daughters, but then soon joins forces – unwillingly – with secret agent Lucy Wilde, whom he later marries. In the third film, after he and Lucy are fired from their jobs at the Anti-Villain League, Gru learns that he has a twin brother, Dru. Along with Lucy and the girls, Gru meets Dru at his mansion in Freedonia, and they form a brotherly relationship throughout the film. In the fourth film, he raises a new child, Felonious Gru Jr. Felonious Gru was originally conceived as a Dracula-like character, but directors Chris Renaud and Pierre Coffin later opted for a villain who would echo "the world of James Bond, thinking of characters like Goldfinger and the Bond-ian world of technology". Gru also bears some similarities with British comic-book character Grimly Feendish, and with the pre-Crisis version of Lex Luthor.
- The Minions (voiced by Pierre Coffin in all films and the theme park attraction, Chris Renaud in the first two films except spin-offs and attractions, James Arnold Taylor in the 2010 video game, and Jemaine Clement as Jerry the Minion in the first film): Gru's small, yellow, comical henchmen who have one or two eyes. The Minions speak a language that Coffin created by mixing gibberish with words from many languages, including English, French, Spanish, Italian, and Indonesian. Although seemingly nonsensical, the English-sounding words are dubbed for every country, in order to make them recognizable. It is shown in Minions that they have existed since the beginning of life on Earth, and desire above all else to serve the most terrible of villains. In the short film "Banana", the Minions are revealed to have an uncontrollable craving for fruits, especially bananas. Mentioned by name in the films and other media are Bob, Stuart, Kevin, Otto, Mel, Dave, Jerry, Tim, Gus, James, Henry, Ed, Dick, Ken, Mike, Carl, Lance, Tony, Tom, Phil, Mark, Brian, Chris, Jorge, Norbert, Ralph, Ron, and Benny.
- The Girls: Three sisters, whom Gru adopts to further his scheme in the first film and gradually comes to love.
  - Margo (voiced by Miranda Cosgrove): The mature oldest sister. In the first film, among the trio, Margo was the most suspicious of Gru initially; but came to trust him at the end of the film. She is something of a protectress to her sisters. She later takes an interest in boys, which makes Gru overprotective, and freezes boys who break her heart.
  - Edith (voiced by Dana Gaier): The tomboyish middle sister; the first to enjoy Gru's eclectic possessions, when adopted by him. She practices martial arts in the second film and shown herself to be mischievous as she pulls pranks on Fritz, Dru's butler in the third film.
  - Agnes (voiced by Elsie Fisher in the first two films; Nev Scharrel in the third film, and Madison Polan in the fourth film): The happy-go-lucky youngest sister, and the quickest to trust Gru in the first film. She is presented as naive and innocent, against her more worldly sisters, and has a strong love for unicorns. In the third film, she "adopts" a one-horned goat whom she names Lucky after mistaking him for a unicorn. Even after learning he was a goat, Agnes continues to love Lucky.
- Lucy Wilde (voiced by Kristen Wiig): A cunning secret agent who has teamed up with Gru to hunt down an extremely dangerous supervillain. She loves one-upping Gru with her quirky gadgets and has perfected her form of martial arts by combining jujitsu, krav maga, Aztec warfare, and krumping. After 147 dates, she marries Gru and becomes the girls' adoptive mother. She is now Mrs. Lucy Gru. In Despicable Me 4, it is revealed that she and Gru have a baby named Gru Jr.
- Dr. Joseph Nefario (voiced by Russell Brand from 2010 to 2022, Romesh Ranganathan from 2024–present, and JB Blanc in the video game): Gru's hearing-impaired inventor and partner-in-crime who speaks with a British accent. He seems to have a romantic interest in Gru's mother, Marlena. In the second film, he misses being a villain so he goes to work for El Macho, but abandons him after he turns the Minions into monsters. He is absent in most of the third film, having accidentally frozen himself in carbonite, similar to that of Han Solo from Star Wars. In Minions: The Rise of Gru, it is revealed Nefario previously worked at a record shop called "Criminal Records", which the Vicious 6 used as a cover for their lair before going to work for Gru. He is seen again at the end of the fourth film, revealing that he is unfrozen and he returns Gru Jr. back to normal, as well as attending Gru's party.
- Silas Ramsbottom (voiced by Steve Coogan): Director of the Anti-Villain League (AVL) in the second film. The Minions (and Gru) make fun of his surname. In the third film, he retires from the AVL and is replaced by Valerie Da Vinci as the new Director of the AVL, though he comes back to replace her at the end. He continues as AVL director in the fourth film, where he takes care of the minions.
- Felonious Gru Jr. (voiced by Tara Strong): An infant biological son of Gru and Lucy and also an adoptive brother of the Girls who initially dislikes his father in the fourth film.
- Poppy Prescott (voiced by Joey King): An aspiring supervillain who admires Gru's work as a villain.
- Kyle: Is a pet dog-like monster of the Gru family, belonging to Gru, and then given to Agnes. Kyle was originally a vicious, aggressive, ferocious, and monstrous blue creature that even Gru had trouble controlling. At times he would attack Gru but despite this, he also seemed to be easily spooked and appeared frightened whenever Gru or anyone else opened the secret lair and also ran away from Agnes, unused to the fact that she thought he was cute instead of trying to avoid him. When Agnes, Edith, and Margo first arrive, Kyle greets them by snarling but he gradually warms up to the girls, especially Agnes, and starts sleeping with her at night. Although he seemed exasperated when the three girls dressed him up, he nevertheless developed an attachment towards them just like Gru did.
- Lucky: Is a small one-horned white baby goat and a supporting character in the third film. Agnes first thought he was a real living unicorn, though Gru tells her that he is just a goat, Agnes still cherishes Lucky, and he becomes her new pet. Agnes discovers him in the Freedonia forest and enthusiastically mistakes him for a Unicorn. When the adorable Unigoat excitedly licks her face, Agnes giggles gleefully and declares that she will call him Lucky, become her pet, and come to live with her in Gru's house. In the fourth film Agnes has to leave Lucky behind and fears he will forget her. At the end they get reunited, and Agnes' fears prove unwarranted.
- Marlena (voiced by Julie Andrews): Gru and Dru's mother. Her neglect of Gru's ambitions is identified among the main reasons why he became a supervillain. In the denouement of the first film, she admits to him that he is a better parent than her. Marlena later makes a silent cameo appearance in the second film at Gru and Lucy's wedding. In the third film, Marlena reveals to Gru that after she and Gru and Dru's father divorced, they promised to never see each other again and they each got to take one son with them, with Marlena saying that she got "second pick".
- Dru Gru (voiced by Steve Carell): Gru's charming, happy-go-lucky long-lost twin brother, who is also in the supervillain business. Dru looks just like his brother, only he has blonde hair and wears white attire. He is Lucy's brother-in-law, Gru Jr.'s uncle, and the adoptive uncle of Margo, Edith, and Agnes.
- Fritz (voiced by Steve Coogan): Dru's courteous, well-mannered butler who speaks with a British accent. He takes Gru, Lucy, and the girls to meet Dru at his mansion in Freedonia.
- Valerie Da Vinci (voiced by Jenny Slate): A ruthless member of the Anti-Villain League (AVL) who replaces Silas Ramsbottom as Director in the third film. She fires Gru and Lucy due to their failure to capture Balthazar Bratt.
- Wild Knuckles (voiced by Alan Arkin): The former leader of the Vicious 6 who was ousted because of his old age, and later becomes Gru's mentor.
- Master Chow (voiced by Michelle Yeoh): A former Kung Fu teacher who now makes a living working at a spa in Minions: The Rise of Gru.

=== Antagonists ===
- Victor "Vector" Perkins (voiced by Jason Segel, Jason Harris in the video game): The villain in the first film, Gru's rival, and the son of Mr. Perkins, the President of the Bank of Evil. He was responsible for the theft of the Great Pyramid of Giza and competes against Gru to get ahold of a shrink ray and eventually of the Moon. However, after he takes the girls hostage to get the Moon, his plan backfires and he gets stuck on the Moon. In the short Mooned, Vector attempts to escape the Moon only to end up on Mars. In the fourth film, he is shown imprisoned with the other villains in the AVL prison, revealing that he managed to return to Earth.
- Mr. Perkins (voiced by Will Arnett): Vector's father and enormous and equally strong President of the Bank of Evil, responsible for giving out loans to villains in their schemes (formerly including Gru). In the fourth film, he is shown imprisoned with the other villains in the AVL prison along with his son.
- Miss Hattie (voiced by Kristen Wiig): The charismatic but cruel owner of the orphanage from which Gru adopts his daughters. She sends Margo, Edith, and Agnes out to sell cookies and makes them sleep in cardboard boxes if they fail to meet their quota.
- Eduardo "El Macho" Pérez (voiced by Benjamin Bratt): A Mexican-accented supervillain in the second film. El Macho was believed to have died after strapping 250 pounds of dynamite on himself and riding a shark into an active volcano. However, it turns out that he faked his death, and he became the owner of a Mexican restaurant. He has a son named Antonio, with whom Margo is infatuated at first until Antonio abandons her. He planned to abduct most of Gru's Minions and turn them into indestructible, evil Minions with a chemical compound he stole called PX-41 and send the mutated Minions to major cities to take over the world. In the fourth film, he is shown imprisoned with the other villains in the AVL prison.
- Pollito: Is El Macho's pet chicken. Eduardo kept Pollito ever since he was a chick, as shown in the picture the restaurant owner keeps in the Salsa & Salsa kitchen, When Lucy and Gru break into the Salsa & Salsa restaurant, Gru accidentally trips a wire which causes Pollito to come out. But Lucy and Gru don't think that the chicken is much of a threat. As Gru starts insulting Pollito stating that the chicken is not so much of a guard dog, the chicken attacks and pecks Gru's face. Lucy stops Pollito by shooting him with epoxy.
- Balthazar Bratt (voiced by Trey Parker): A supervillain in the third film. A former 1980s child star, he adopts the identity of his supervillain character after the onset of puberty leads to the cancellation of his television series. He is obsessed with 1980s pop culture and uses a giant robot armed with a laser and inflatable bubble gum to exact revenge on Hollywood. In the fourth film, he is shown imprisoned with the other villains in the AVL prison.
- Clive (voiced by Andy Nyman): A robot who acts as Balthazar Bratt's sidekick.
- Maxime Le Mal (voiced by Will Ferrell): A supervillain and Gru's childhood rival who wants revenge on Gru and his family in the fourth film. Maxime has augmented himself with cockroach parts and temporarily turns Gru Jr. into a human-roach hybrid but is defeated when Gru Jr. turns on him. Later, he reconciles with Gru at the AVL prison.
- Valentina (voiced by Sofia Vergara): Maxime's femme fatale girlfriend.
- Principal Frau Übelschlecht (voiced by Chris Renaud): In Despicable Me 4, she is the principal of Lycée Pas Bon who tries to kill Gru for stealing the mascot of the school.
- Scarlet Overkill (voiced by Sandra Bullock): In Minions, she is the world's first female super-villain who is bent on becoming the Queen of England, and served as the Minions' boss before Gru. In the fourth film, she is shown imprisoned with the other villains in the AVL prison alongside her husband Herb.
- Herb Overkill (voiced by Jon Hamm): Scarlet's husband and an inventor. In the fourth film, he is shown imprisoned with the other villains in the AVL prison along with his wife Scarlet.
- The Vicious 6: A group of six supervillains who appear in Minions: The Rise of Gru. In the fourth film, the group is shown imprisoned with the other villains in the AVL prison. Their members include:
  - Belle Bottom (voiced by Taraji P. Henson): A disco-themed villain and the newly appointed leader of the group after Wild Knuckles, who wants to take on the Anti-Villain League.
  - Jean Clawed (voiced by Jean-Claude Van Damme): A member with a giant mechanical lobster claw for his right arm who speaks in a French accent.
  - Nun-Chuck (voiced by Lucy Lawless): A nunchuck-wielding nun.
  - Svengeance (voiced by Dolph Lundgren): A roller skater.
  - Stronghold (voiced by Danny Trejo): A member with big metal hands.

== Cast and characters ==
List indicators

This section includes characters who will appear or have appeared in the franchise in notable roles.

- An empty grey cell indicates the character was not in the film, or that the character's official presence has not yet been confirmed.
- ^{A} indicates an appearance through archival footage or audio.
- ^{C} indicates a cameo role.

Character	Main films				Short films							Spin-off films		
Character	Despicable Me	Despicable Me 2	Despicable Me 3	Despicable Me 4	Home Makeover	Training Wheels	Binky Nelson Unpacified	The Secret Life of Kyle	Minion Scouts	Mooned	Midnight Mission	Minions	Minions: The Rise of Gru	Minions & Monsters
=== Introduced in Despicable Me ===
Felonious Gru Sr.	Steve Carell	Steve Carell	Steve Carell	Steve Carell	Silent role			Photograph				Steve Carell	Steve Carell	Steve Carell^{C}
Minions	Pierre Coffin Chris Renaud Jemaine Clement	Pierre Coffin Chris Renaud	Pierre Coffin	Pierre Coffin	Pierre Coffin	Pierre Coffin		Pierre Coffin	Pierre Coffin	Pierre Coffin	Pierre Coffin	Pierre Coffin	Pierre Coffin	Pierre Coffin
Margo	Miranda Cosgrove	Miranda Cosgrove	Miranda Cosgrove	Miranda Cosgrove	Miranda Cosgrove	Miranda Cosgrove		Miranda Cosgrove	Miranda Cosgrove		Miranda Cosgrove			
Edith	Dana Gaier	Dana Gaier	Dana Gaier	Dana Gaier	Dana Gaier	Dana Gaier		Dana Gaier	Dana Gaier		Dana Gaier			
Agnes	Elsie Fisher	Elsie Fisher	Nev Scharrel	Madison Polan	Elsie Fisher	Elsie Fisher		Nev Scharrel	Nev Scharrel		Madison Polan			Madison Polan^{C}
Dr. Nefario	Russell Brand	Russell Brand	Silent role	Romesh Ranganathan								Silent role	Russell Brand	Romesh Ranganathan^{C}
Marlena Gru	Julie Andrews	Silent cameo	Julie Andrews	Silent cameo								Silent role	Julie Andrews	
Vector	Jason Segel			Jason Segel^{A}^{C}						Jason Segel			Photograph	
Mr. Perkins	Will Arnett			Silent cameo									Will Arnett	
Fred McDade	Danny McBride	Silent role		Silent cameo										
Miss Hattie	Kristen Wiig													
=== Introduced in Despicable Me 2 ===
Lucy Wilde		Kristen Wiig	Kristen Wiig	Kristen Wiig										
Silas Ramsbottom		Steve Coogan	Steve Coogan	Steve Coogan									Steve Coogan	
Eduardo Pérez El Macho		Benjamin Bratt		Benjamin Bratt^{A}^{C}								Silent role		
Antonio		Moises Arias												
=== Introduced in Despicable Me 3 ===
Balthazar Bratt			Trey Parker	Trey Parker^{A}^{C}										
Dru			Steve Carell	Silent cameo										
Clive			Andy Nyman											
Fritz			Steve Coogan											
Valerie Da Vinci			Jenny Slate											
Nico			Adrian Ciscato											
Museum Director			Pierre Coffin											
=== Introduced in Despicable Me 4 ===
Felonious Gru Jr.				Tara Strong										
Poppy Prescott				Joey King										
Maxime Le Mal				Will Ferrell										
Valentina				Sofia Vergara										
Principal Frau Übelschlecht				Chris Renaud										
Perry Prescott				Stephen Colbert										
Patsy Prescott				Chloe Fineman										
Melora				Laraine Newman										
=== Introduced in Minions ===
Scarlett Overkill				Silent cameo								Sandra Bullock	Photograph	
Herb Overkill				Silent cameo								Jon Hamm		
Elizabeth II												Jennifer Saunders		
Walter Nelson							Michael Keaton					Michael Keaton		
Madge Nelson							Allison Janney					Allison Janney		
Tina Nelson							Katy Mixon					Katy Mixon		
Walter Jr.							Michael Beattie					Michael Beattie		
Binky Nelson							Tara Strong					Character is mute		
Narrator												Geoffrey Rush		
=== Introduced in Minions: The Rise of Gru ===
Wild Knuckles				Photograph									Alan Arkin	
Belle Bottom				Silent cameo									Taraji P. Henson	
Jean-Clawed				Silent cameo									Jean-Claude Van Damme	
Nun-Chuck				Silent cameo									Lucy Lawless	
Svengeance				Silent cameo									Dolph Lundgren	
Stronghold				Silent cameo									Danny Trejo	
Master Chow													Michelle Yeoh	
Biker													RZA	
=== Introduced in Minions & Monsters ===
Goomi														Trey Parker
Phillips														Bobby Moynihan
Howard														Phil LaMarr
Dort														Jesse Eisenberg
Olivia H.														Allison Janney
Max														Christoph Waltz
Debbie														Zoey Deutch
Frank Bright														Jeff Bridges
Elwood Bright														Jeff Bridges
George Lucas														George Lucas

== Crew ==
Role	Main films				Spin-offs		
Role	Despicable Me	Despicable Me 2	Despicable Me 3	Despicable Me 4	Minions	Minions: The Rise of Gru	Minions & Monsters
Director(s)	Chris Renaud; Pierre Coffin	Chris Renaud; Pierre Coffin	Pierre Coffin; Kyle Balda Co-Director: Eric Guillon	Chris Renaud Co-Director: Patrick Delage	Pierre Coffin; Kyle Balda	Kyle Balda Co-Directors: Brad Ableson; Jonathan del Val	Pierre Coffin Co-Director: Patrick Delage
Producer(s)	Chris Meledandri; John Cohen; Janet Healy	Chris Meledandri; Janet Healy	Chris Meledandri; Janet Healy	Chris Meledandri; Brett Hoffman	Chris Meledandri; Janet Healy	Chris Meledandri; Janet Healy; Chris Renaud	Chris Meledandri; Bill Ryan
Executive Producer(s)	Nina Rowan; Sergio Pablos	—N/a	Chris Renaud	—N/a	Chris Renaud	Brett Hoffman	Brian Lynch; Chris Renaud
Writer(s)	Screenplay: Cinco Paul; Ken Daurio Story: Sergio Pablos	Cinco Paul; Ken Daurio	Cinco Paul; Ken Daurio	Mike White; Ken Daurio	Brian Lynch	Screenplay: Matthew Fogel Story: Brian Lynch; Matthew Fogel	Brian Lynch; Pierre Coffin
Composer(s)	Heitor Pereira; Pharrell Williams	Heitor Pereira; Pharrell Williams	Heitor Pereira; Pharrell Williams	Heitor Pereira; Pharrell Williams	Heitor Pereira	Heitor Pereira	John Powell
Editor(s)	Pamela Ziegenhagen-Shefland; Gregory Perler	Gregory Perler	Claire Dodgson	Tiffany Hillkurtz	Claire Dodgson	Claire Dodgson	Gregory Perler
Studio(s)	Illumination	Illumination	Illumination	Illumination	Illumination	Illumination	Illumination
Distributor(s)	Universal Pictures	Universal Pictures	Universal Pictures	Universal Pictures	Universal Pictures	Universal Pictures	Universal Pictures

== Reception ==
=== Box office performance ===
The Despicable Me franchise has grossed a total of more than $6 billion, making it the highest-grossing animated film franchise, and the 13th highest-grossing film franchise of all time.

Film	U.S. release date	Box office gross			All-time ranking		Budget	Ref.
Film	U.S. release date	U.S. and Canada	Other territories	Worldwide	U.S. and Canada	Worldwide	Budget	Ref.
Despicable Me	July 9, 2010	$251,557,985	$291,600,000	$543,157,985	142	203	$69,000,000	
Despicable Me 2	July 3, 2013	$368,065,385	$602,700,620	$970,766,005	60	56	$76,000,000	
Despicable Me 3	June 30, 2017	$264,624,300	$770,175,831	$1,034,800,131	129	46	$80,000,000	
Despicable Me 4	July 3, 2024	$361,004,205	$611,117,205	$972,221,410	65	65	$100,000,000	
Main series		$1,245,251,875	$2,275,593,656	$3,520,945,531			$325,000,000	
Minions	July 10, 2015	$336,045,770	$823,352,627	$1,159,398,397	74	26	$74,000,000	
Minions: The Rise of Gru	July 1, 2022	$370,549,695	$569,933,000	$940,482,695	57	66	$80,000,000	
Minions & Monsters	July 1, 2026	$183,162,515	$334,985,000	$518,147,515			$85,000,000	
Prequel series		$889,757,980	$1,728,270,627	$2,618,028,607			$239,000,000	
Total		$2,135,009,855	$4,003,864,283	$6,138,974,138	18	13	$564,000,000	

=== Critical and public response ===
Film	Critical		Public
Film	Rotten Tomatoes	Metacritic	CinemaScore
Despicable Me	80% (200 reviews)	72 (35 reviews)	A
Despicable Me 2	75% (184 reviews)	62 (39 reviews)	A
Minions	55% (223 reviews)	56 (35 reviews)	A
Despicable Me 3	58% (193 reviews)	49 (37 reviews)	A–
Minions: The Rise of Gru	70% (184 reviews)	56 (41 reviews)	A
Despicable Me 4	56% (166 reviews)	52 (36 reviews)	A
Minions & Monsters	89% (181 reviews)	70 (30 reviews)	A–

=== Accolades ===
Despicable Me 2 was nominated for the Academy Award for Best Animated Feature. Alongside the second film, Despicable Me and Minions were also nominated for BAFTA Award for Best Animated Film. The first three Despicable Me films each received a nomination for the Critics' Choice Movie Award for Best Animated Feature. Despicable Me and Despicable Me 2 were nominated for the Golden Globe Award for Best Animated Feature Film.
