= Minions Paradise =

2015 mobile game

- Developer: EA Salt Lake
- Publisher: EA Mobile
- Series: Despicable Me
- Platforms: Android, iOS
- Release: October 13, 2015; Discontinued May 22, 2017
- Genre: City-building game

Minions Paradise was a mobile game focused on characters appearing in the animated family comedy film franchise Despicable Me and based on the spin-off film Minions (2015). The game was developed by Electronic Arts in partnership with Illumination and Universal Partnerships & Licensing. It was given a soft launch on April 21, 2015 and was later given an official release on October 13 of the same year worldwide on Android and iOS.

The game was shut down on May 22, 2017 and removed from the store (for non-players); players could continue playing the game until the shutdown, but in-app purchases were disabled. After that the game servers went permanently offline, becoming unplayable.

== Synopsis ==
The game follows the Minions as they go on vacation on a cruise ship. Things quickly go wrong after some of Phil's antics result in the ship sinking, leaving the Minions in the water and him on a deserted island. This causes them to get angry at him so he must try to make it up to them by turning the island into a perfect vacation spot.

== Reception ==
Critical reception has been mixed. Gamezebo reviewed the game and wrote: "Much of Minions Paradise will seem familiar to anyone who’s played other free city/town/base/resort building games before. You stock up on money, resources, and premium currency in order to build fancier things and expand your territory so that you can stock up on even more money, resources, and premium currency. But beneath the simple setup is a game that’s honestly kind of refreshing in its approach to free-to-play." Forbes criticized Minions Paradise in a review about Star Wars: Battlefront, where they called it a "familiar and formulaic phone and tablet game built around timers, tapped icons, and insidious invitations to skip forward in a build queue by buying fake currency in bundles that cost anywhere from $2.99 to $99.99" and wrote that "the imposed bottle necks on upgrades and item acquisition makes tapping both incessant and detached from any dramatic significance, something that feeds a recursive loop of player presence." Apple'N'Apps gave Minions Paradise a score of 3.5, praising it for its mini-games, theme and flow of quests and objectives while also criticizing it for being too similar to other freemium simulation games.
