= Pierre Coffin =

French animator and voice actor (born 1967)

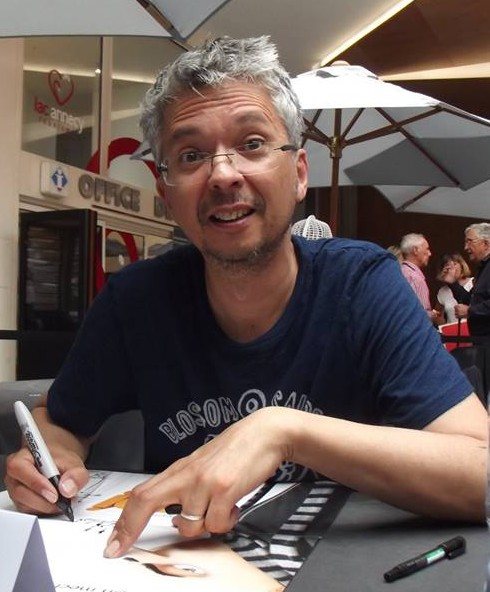
- Coffin in 2017
- Born: Pierre-Louis Padang Coffin; 16 March 1967 (age 59); France
- Occupations: Animator, director, writer, producer, voice actor
- Years active: 1993–present
- Known for: Voice of the Minions in the Despicable Me franchise
- Children: 2
- Parent(s): Yves Coffin; Nh. Dini

Pierre-Louis Padang Coffin (born 16 March 1967) is a French animator, director, producer, writer, and voice actor. He is best known for co-directing the first four installments in the Despicable Me franchise and being the co-creator and primary voice of all of the Minions, which won him the Kids Family Award at the 10th Seiyu Awards. He also received a nomination for the Academy Award for Best Animated Feature for Despicable Me 2.

== Life and career ==
Coffin was born on 16 March 1967 in France to Nh. Dini, an Indonesian novelist and Yves Coffin, a French diplomat. He has a sister, Marie-Claire. During his childhood, they often moved across Asia, living in Cambodia and Japan, before settling in a Parisian suburb in the 1970s. Growing up, their father forbade them watching television, considering it too passive. Instead, Coffin drew, read and listened to music a lot. Although he had never considered a career in the arts, some talented friends of his, who were better at drawing than he, inspired him to work on improving his skills.

Between 1985 and 1988, he studied cinema at the Paris-Sorbonne University. While attending his military service, he withdrew to take the entrance exam for the Gobelins animation school in Paris. Passing, he studied the 2D course from 1990 to 1993. Then he moved to Amblin, the 2D London-based facility, where he worked for one year as a junior animator on the Steven Spielberg-executive-produced We're Back! A Dinosaur's Story. He then started as a freelance animator in the French CGI studio Ex Machina where he worked as an animator and eventually animation supervisor. Pierre Coffin's directorial career began with a short film named Pings in 1997. He then started to collaborate by doing commercials with Passion Pictures Paris and Mac Guff. He created the characters Pat & Stan for the titular TF1 TV series. In 2010 he completed, with Chris Renaud, the feature CGI-animated movie Despicable Me for Universal.

Coffin directed Despicable Me (2010) and Despicable Me 2 (2013), with Renaud, Despicable Me 3 (2017) and the Despicable Me spin-off, Minions (2015) with Kyle Balda. Coffin provides the voice of the Minions in each installment of the Despicable Me and Minions franchise including the following films, Minions: The Rise of Gru (2022) and Despicable Me 4 (2024). Coffin returned to direct Minions & Monsters, which was released in 2026. Coffin recorded several different dubs of the Minion voices for Minions in order to better appeal to different national markets, mixing in varying local words depending on the country.

In April 2023, Coffin was announced to be developing two webseries for Illumination that were planned to debut on TikTok and later on YouTube, titled Who's Who and Bones Story.

In September 2026, Coffin signed with WME to represent him across all areas, as he has expressed interest in pursuing live-action projects and "other projects that go beyond animation", while still working for Illumination.

== Personal life ==
Coffin has two children.

== Filmography ==
=== Film ===
Year	Title	Director	Writer	Inbetween Artist	Other	Voice Role
1993	We're Back! A Dinosaur's Story	No	No	Yes	No	
2010	Despicable Me	Yes	No	No	Yes	The Minions
2013	Despicable Me 2	Yes	No	No	Yes	The Minions
2015	Minions	Yes	No	No	Yes	The Minions
2017	Despicable Me 3	Yes	No	No	Yes	The Minions and Museum Director
2022	Minions: The Rise of Gru	No	No	No	Yes	The Minions
2024	Despicable Me 4	No	No	No	Yes	The Minions
2026	Minions & Monsters	Yes	Yes	No	Yes	The Minions

=== Short films ===
Year	Title	Director	Other	Voice Role
2003	Gary's Day	Yes	No	
2011	Brad & Gary	Yes	Yes	Brad

=== Television ===
Year	Title	Director	Writer	Creator
2004–2010	Pat & Stan	Yes	Yes	Yes

== Accolades ==
=== Films ===
Year	Title	Notes
2010	Despicable Me	Nominated—Annie Award for Outstanding Achievement for Directing in a Feature Production
2013	Despicable Me 2	Nominated—Academy Award for Best Animated Feature; Nominated—Annie Award for Voice Acting in a Feature Production
2015	Minions	Nominated—Annie Award for Voice Acting in a Feature Production
2017	Despicable Me 3	Nominated—Visual Effects Society Award for Outstanding Visual Effects in an Animated Feature
