= Chris Renaud =

American filmmaker (born 1966)

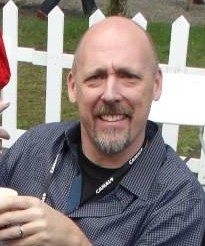
- Renaud in 2013
- Born: December 1966 (age 59); Baltimore, Maryland, U.S.
- Education: Syracuse University
- Occupations: Director; producer; designer; storyboard artist; voice actor
- Years active: 1989–present
- Employers: Blue Sky Studios (2001–2007); Illumination (2007–present)
- Spouse: Lauren Renaud
- Children: 2

Chris Renaud (born December 1966) is an American filmmaker, designer, storyboard artist, and voice actor. He is best known for his work at Illumination, including directing the company's animated films such as the first, second, and fourth films in the Despicable Me franchise (2010–present), the first two of which he co-directed with Pierre Coffin, The Lorax (2012), The Secret Life of Pets (2016) and its sequel The Secret Life of Pets 2 (2019).

He also voiced the Minions in the first two films in the Despicable Me franchise and Norman in The Secret Life of Pets franchise, the former which he co-created with Coffin. Renaud received nominations for two Academy Awards for the Ice Age short film No Time for Nuts (2006) and Despicable Me 2 (2013).

== Early life and education ==
Renaud was born in December 1966, in Baltimore. At age 15, he moved to Bethlehem, Pennsylvania when his father, who worked for Bethlehem Steel, was transferred to their corporate headquarters. Renaud has said he had mixed feelings with the move, saying it upset him but it was also one of the best things in his life because it showed him "that there was a great, big world out there."

He attended Parkland High School in South Whitehall Township, Pennsylvania, where he was the artist for the high school yearbooks and newspaper and had aspirations of creating comic books and graduated in 1985. He then attended the Baum School of Art in Allentown, Pennsylvania, where he received a $1,000 scholarship.

In 1989, he graduated from Syracuse University with an illustration degree.

== Career ==
Renaud began work as a graphic designer in the sports entertainment industry. He has created logos and mascots for NFL Properties, the NBA, and Foot Locker. After working as a designer and illustrator for a variety of publications and agencies, Renaud began drawing and writing comic books. Working for both Marvel Comics and DC Comics, his projects included illustrating Marvel's Starfleet Academy and pitching the story concept that evolved into Batman: Cataclysm which depicted a devastating earthquake hitting Gotham City. This yearlong tale across all Batman-related comics resulted in increased sales and visibility for the renowned character and set up the acclaimed No Man's Land storyline that followed.

As the production designer on the Disney Channel's The Book of Pooh, Renaud transitioned into the world of children's television. Since that groundbreaking project, he has been able to design virtual sets and puppet characters for Bear in the Big Blue House, LazyTown, Curious Pictures and Sony Pictures Animation. With It's a Big Big World, which aired from 2006 to 2010 on PBS, he took the lead in visual development and design of every aspect of the program.

Renaud worked for Blue Sky Studios as a story artist on the films Robots, Ice Age: The Meltdown, and the Dr. Seuss adaptation Horton Hears a Who!. He wrote and co-directed the animated short No Time for Nuts, which received an Annie Award and a 2007 Oscar nomination for animated short film. It was also included in the Animation Show of Shows in 2006.

Renaud moved to Paris to work for Illumination Entertainment. While directing Despicable Me (2010), Renaud, along with his directing partner Pierre Coffin, began to develop Gru's famous henchmen, the Minions. Initially, there were discussions about making the creatures robots. Then Renaud hit upon the notion that they could be mole people and slapped goggles on them. "I did a very rough, ugly, little sketch combining some elements into a mole person and sent it to Pierre, who then discussed it with Eric Guillon, who was the art director and final designer of the Minions, and they took some of those ideas and together we came up with what the Minions look like". The more the filmmakers worked on the little guys, the more yellow and more cylindrical they became. "Eric continued to refine the idea and made [the Minions] closer to children. He made them funnier and simpler and a brighter color". Among the inspirations for the Minions were the Oompa-Loompas from Willy Wonka and the Jawas from Star Wars, as well as silent screen stars Buster Keaton and Charlie Chaplin, and Warner Bros. cartoon characters.

In a four-picture directing deal, he directed Despicable Me (2010), Dr. Seuss' The Lorax (2012), Despicable Me 2 (2013), and The Secret Life of Pets (2016), in which two pet dogs, Max and Duke, have to put their quarrels behind when they find out that a bunny, Snowball, is building an army of abandoned pets to take revenge on all pet owners and their pets. Renaud signed a new contract with Illumination Entertainment in 2013, saying: "I love working with Illumination. They've given me an unparalleled opportunity to keep directing one movie after another. Very often animation directors make one movie and then spend the next five years developing another one. But I'm in the unique position of being able to keep working and keep making movies... So I feel very fortunate."

In a 2012 interview, he mentioned that he read Dr. Seuss books as a child, which influenced his work with films such as The Lorax. When asked if he would shift towards live-action movies, he said that he has thought about it and it may happen in the future but he feels comfortable with animation for now.

Renaud executive-produced Minions in 2015, Despicable Me 3 in 2017, and The Grinch in 2018, and produced Minions: The Rise of Gru in 2022. He returned to direct the sequels The Secret Life of Pets 2 in 2019 and Despicable Me 4 in 2024.

== Personal life ==
Since 2008, Renaud has lived in Paris, with his wife, Lauren, and their two children, John and Kiely.

== Filmography ==
=== Film ===
Year	Title	Director	Producer	Storyboard Artist	Other	Voice role
2005	Robots	No	No	Yes	No	
2006	Ice Age: The Meltdown	No	No	Yes	No	
2008	Dr. Seuss' Horton Hears a Who!	No	No	Yes	No	
2009	Ice Age: Dawn of the Dinosaurs	No	No	Yes	No	
2010	Despicable Me	Yes	No	No	Yes	Dave the Minion
2012	Dr. Seuss' The Lorax	Yes	No	No	Yes	Forest Animals
2013	Despicable Me 2	Yes	No	No	Yes	Evil Minions and Italian Waiter
2015	Minions	No	Executive	No	No	
2016	The Secret Life of Pets	Yes	No	No	Yes	Norman
2016	Sing	No	No	No	Yes	Additional voices
2017	Despicable Me 3	No	Executive	No	No	
2018	Dr. Seuss' The Grinch	No	Executive	No	No	
2019	The Secret Life of Pets 2	Yes	No	No	Yes	Norman
2021	Minions & Monsters	No	Executive	No	No	Short film
2021	Sing 2	No	No	No	Yes	Additional voices
2022	Minions: The Rise of Gru	No	Yes	No	No	
2023	Migration	No	No	No	Yes	Additional voices
2024	Despicable Me 4	Yes	No	No	Yes	Principal Übelschlecht
2026	Minions & Monsters	No	Executive	No	No	

=== Television ===
Year	Title	Notes
2001–2004	The Book of Pooh	Digital Set Art Director; Production Designer
2002–2006	Bear in the Big Blue House	Graphic Designer
2006	It's a Big Big World	Character Designer; Production Designer
