= Kyle Balda =

American animator and film director

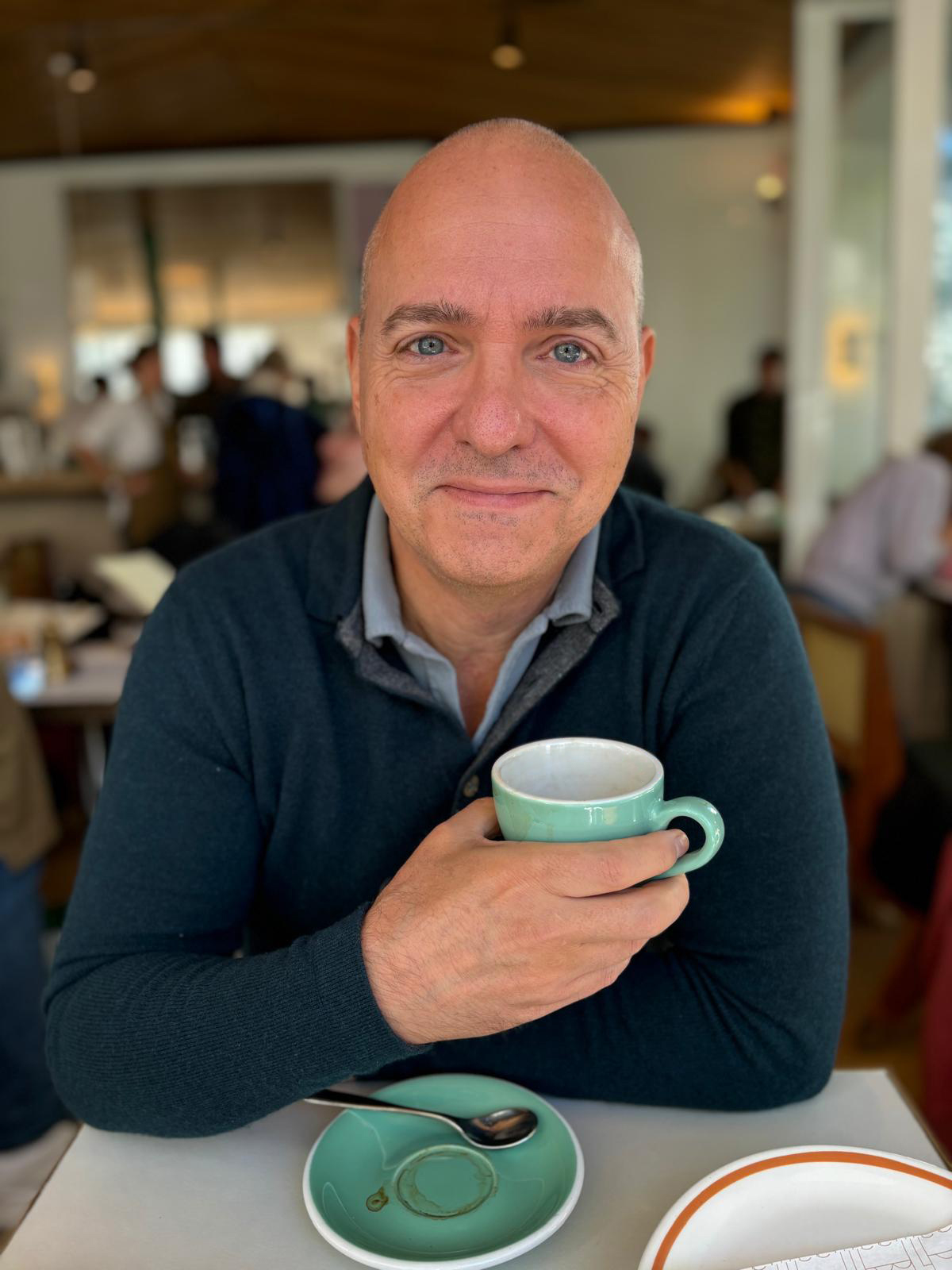
- Balda in 2024
- Born: Tucson, Arizona, U.S.
- Education: California Institute of the Arts
- Occupations: Animator; film director
- Years active: 1994–present
- Employers: Industrial Light & Magic (1993-1996); Pixar (1996–2002); Illumination (2010–present)

Kyle Balda is an American animator and film director, best known for co-directing the Illumination films The Lorax (2012), with Chris Renaud; Minions (2015) and Despicable Me 3 (2017), with Pierre Coffin; and Minions: The Rise of Gru (2022), with Brad Ableson and Jonathan del Val. He also directed the live-action film The Sheep Detectives (2026). He previously worked as an animator for Industrial Light & Magic before moving to Pixar where he worked on three of their films.

== Early life ==
Balda was born in Tucson, Arizona, to a Maltese mother. He studied at the California Institute of the Arts in the early 1990s and dropped out after two years for a job he was offered.

== Career ==
During his time at CalArts, Balda was hired by LucasArts as an intern to create the animated opening credit sequence for the graphic adventure game Day of the Tentacle.

He started his career as an animator by working at Industrial Light & Magic (ILM), in films including The Mask as graphics animator, Jumanji as animation supervisor, and Mars Attacks! as character animator. He also worked at Weta Digital once in New Zealand, on the 1996 film The Frighteners, animating the character of the Grim Reaper for the film. Later, Balda started working at Pixar; where he was credited as an additional animator in A Bug's Life, as directing animator in Toy Story 2, and as animator in Monsters, Inc.. He would later join French studio Mac Guff Ligne where he would work closely with Pierre Coffin on commercials and TV shows, as an animator or co-director. This collaboration would lead to him becoming head of layout on Despicable Me. Balda has also directed several short films and lectured at different animation schools.

In 2012, Balda made his directorial debut at Illumination as co-director of The Lorax, along with Chris Renaud. The film was released domestically on March 2, 2012, by Universal Pictures and grossed over $348 million with a budget of $70 million.

In 2015, Balda directed another Illumination animated film, Minions, this time alongside Pierre Coffin. The film was released domestically on July 10, 2015, by Universal and has grossed over $1.1 billion.

In 2017, Balda co-directed Despicable Me 3. In his role as co-director, he pushed for the film to have a more vibrant color palette than its predecessors.

On June 7, 2024, it was announced Balda would make his live-action directorial debut with The Sheep Detectives, a film adaptation of Leonie Swann's book Three Bags Full, set to be produced by Amazon MGM Studios.

== Personal life ==
Balda currently resides in the Oregon coast.

== Filmography ==
=== Film ===
Year	Title	Notes
1994	The Flintstones	CGI animator
1994	The Mask	Graphics animator
1995	Jumanji	Animation supervisor
1996	Mars Attacks!	Character animator
1996	The Frighteners	Character animator
1998	A Bug's Life	Additional animator
1999	Toy Story 2	Directing animator
2001	Monsters, Inc.	Animator
2010	Despicable Me	Layout supervisor
2011	Hop	Special thanks
2012	The Lorax	Co-director
2012	Forces of Nature	Director
2015	Minions	Director
2015	Competition	Director
2016	Weenie	Director
2017	Despicable Me 3	Director
2022	Minions: The Rise of Gru	Director
2026	The Sheep Detectives	Director
