= Sergio Pablos =

Spanish animator and director

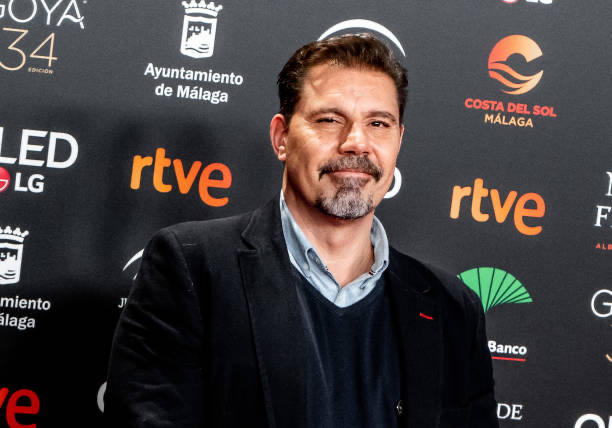
- Pablos in 2019
- Born: Madrid, Spain
- Education: California Institute of the Arts (BFA)
- Occupations: Animator; film director; screenwriter
- Years active: 1993–present
- Employer(s): Walt Disney Feature Animation (1994–2002); Illumination (2010)
- Notable work: Despicable Me franchise (creator); Smallfoot (creator); Klaus
- Spouse: Marisa Roman
- Children: 2
- Website: thespastudios.com

Sergio Pablos is a Spanish animator, director and screenwriter. While at the helm of his company (The SPA Studios), Pablos developed several concepts for animated feature films, most notably the original ideas upon which Despicable Me (Universal Pictures and Illumination in 2010) and Smallfoot (produced by the Warner Bros. Pictures Animation in 2018) were based.

The SPA Studios has produced Netflix's first original animated feature film, Klaus (2019), written and directed by Pablos, which was nominated for the Academy Award for Best Animated Feature.

== Early life ==
Sergio Pablos is from Madrid. After working as a key animator on Once Upon a Forest (1993), he moved to Paris, France, to pursue a career opportunity at Walt Disney Animation Studios where he worked on The Hunchback of Notre Dame (1996) and Hercules (1997). Pablos was then promoted to a Supervising Animator position at Disney Feature Animation in Burbank, handling the character of Tantor the elephant on Tarzan (1999), and Dr. Doppler on Treasure Planet (2002), the latter of which garnered him a nomination for Best Character Animation at the Annie Awards.

== Career ==
Pablos' first job in animation with Disney Studios in Paris was as a character designer on A Goofy Movie (1995). From that connection he moved to Walt Disney Animation Studios and began learning the ropes, working as animator or contributing to character designs on several major 2D animation productions, including The Hunchback of Notre Dame (character of Frollo), Hercules (character of Hades), Tarzan (character of Tantor the elephant), and Treasure Planet (character of Doctor Doppler). He was nominated for an Annie Award for his work on Treasure Planet. Subsequent to his departure from Disney, he was hired as character design supervisor on Stuart Little 3: Call of the Wild for Columbia.

After several more years working in animation production, Pablos created the Despicable Me franchise based on his original screen story Evil Me and his own art design. He took the package unsolicited to Universal Pictures where he became the first of several screenwriters on the project as well as executive producer. In 2010, Despicable Me—starring Steve Carell, Jason Segel, Russell Brand, Kristen Wiig, Miranda Cosgrove, Will Arnett, and Julie Andrews—was a box office success, received a Golden Globe nomination, and became one of animation's highest-grossing movies. Pablos continued work as a character designer on another animated feature, Rio for 20th Century Fox, which was released the following year. He received his second Annie Award nomination for Rio. After the release of Despicable Me 2 in 2013, theatrical markets (worldwide box office) and ancillary markets (home media, cable, merchandising, books, video games, TV series, theme parks, etc.), pushed franchise total revenues to over ten figures. He was the writer for the film Warner Animation Group's Smallfoot. He then formed The SPA Studios in Madrid, Spain, where he made his directorial debut with Klaus.

In Summer 2022, it was announced that Pablos was set to write and direct another film, Ember. However, by December 2022, Netflix canceled the project due to its lengthy production. Pablos still has the rights to the film, and would be able to shop the film to other production companies. In October 2025, Pablos announced he was still developing Ember.

In May 2026, Jon Favreau announced that Pablos and his animation studio in Madrid would handle the traditional animation services for his live-action/animated hybrid series based on Oswald The Lucky Rabbit which is slated for a 2027 release on Disney+.

== Personal life ==
Pablos shares his time between the U.S. and Spain where he is CEO and Creative Director of The SPA Studios in Madrid.

== Filmography ==
=== Filmmaking credits ===
Year	Title	Director	Writer	Producer	Notes
2010	Despicable Me	No	Original Story	Executive	
2018	Smallfoot	No	Book	Executive	Based on the unpublished book Yeti Tracks
2019	Klaus	Yes	Yes	Yes	Voice roles: Pumpkin / Olaf, directorial debut
TBA	Ember	Yes	Yes	Yes	

=== Animation credits ===
Year	Title	Credited as	Notes
1993	Once Upon A Forest	Key animator: Lápiz Azul Animación	
1995	Operavox	Key animator in episode "Rhinegold"	Television series
1995	A Goofy Movie	Animator: "Paris" / character designer	
1995	Runaway Brain	Animator	Short
1996	The Hunchback of Notre Dame	Animator: "Frollo"	
1997	Hercules	Animator: "Hades"	
1999	Tarzan	Character designer / visual development artist/ supervising animator: "Tantor"	
2002	Treasure Planet	Supervising animator: "Doctor Doppler"	
2005	Tarzan II	Character designer	Direct-to-video
2005	Stuart Little 3: Call of the Wild	Character design supervisor	Direct-to-video
2006	Asterix and the Vikings	Animation director: Animagic	
2006	The Fox and the Hound 2	Character design supervisor: Animagic Films	Direct-to-video
2007	Nocturna	Animation supervisor: Animagic	
2009	Alma	Character designer	Short
2011	Rio	Character designer	
2013	Underdogs	Animation advisor	
2017	Ferdinand	Character designer	
2018	La Noria	Additional character design	Short
2027	Oswald	Animation supervisor	Television series

== Awards and nominations ==
Year	Award	Category	Work	Result
2003	Annie Awards	Best Character Animation	Treasure Planet for "Dr. Delbert Doppler"	Nominated
2012	Annie Awards	Best Character Design in a Feature Production	Rio	Nominated
2020	Academy Awards	Best Animated Feature	Klaus	Nominated
2020	Annie Awards	Best Animated Feature	Klaus	Won
2020	Annie Awards	Best Directing in a Feature Production	Klaus	Won
2020	Annie Awards	Best Storyboarding in a Feature Production	Klaus	Won
2020	BAFTA Awards	Best Animated Film	Klaus	Won
2020	Goya Awards	Best Animated Film	Klaus	Nominated
2020	Humanitas Prize	Best Family Feature	Klaus	Nominated
2020	Quirino Awards	Best Feature	Klaus	Nominated
