= Bubble Boy (musical) =

American stage musical

- Music: Cinco Paul
- Lyrics: Cinco Paul
- Book: Cinco Paul; Ken Daurio
- Basis: Bubble Boy by Cinco Paul; Ken Daurio
- Premiere: November 6, 2013: Hamilton Stage, Rahway, New Jersey
- Productions: 2013 New Jersey; 2016 Virginia

Bubble Boy is a musical with music and lyrics by Cinco Paul and book by Cinco Paul and Ken Daurio, based on the 2001 Touchstone Pictures' film Bubble Boy. Like the movie, it tells the story of Jimmy Livingston, a boy born without immunities who is forced to live in a plastic bubble room. Thematically, the musical explores the idea that we all have our "bubbles" which prevent us from being all we can be, and that we need to break out of them.

The musical's first professional production opened November 6, 2013 at Hamilton Stage in Rahway, New Jersey. An original cast recording was released by Ghostlight Records on July 14, 2017, and the show was subsequently published by Dramatists Play Service and became available for professional and nonprofessional licensed productions.

== Background ==
The original movie Bubble Boy was a commercial and critical failure that didn't turn out the way that Cinco Paul and Ken Daurio wanted it to. They saw turning it into a musical as a way to redeem the story and tell it as they originally intended. The first production was in February 2008 at the Thousand Oaks Civic Arts Plaza's Scherr Forum and featured a cast of high school students. The musical was subsequently chosen by the Disney ASCAP Musical Theatre Workshop, headed by Stephen Schwartz, who became a champion of the show. He has said, "Bubble Boy is one of the cleverest, funniest, and most endearing musicals I've seen in a long time." This led to workshops at Carnegie Mellon University, Penn State University, and several readings in New York City.

During the development of the show, Jimmy, the bubble boy, was played by Shaun Fleming, Hunter Herdlicka and Jeremy Jordan, among others. Mrs. Livingston was played by Emily Skinner, Ryah Nixon and Victoria Clark, among others. The role of Chloe was played by Caissie Levy and Lilli Passero, among others.

== Productions ==
=== Original production ===
The first production of Bubble Boy was at the Thousand Oaks Civic Arts Plaza's Scherr Forum on February 7–8, 2008. It was directed by Sherry Coben and featured Shaun Fleming as Jimmy, Alex Paul as Chloe, Allison Martone as Mrs. Livingston, and Jordan Stidham as Slim. The rest of the cast was made up of local high school students, including Jonathan Rado and Sam France from the band Foxygen.

=== Rahway production ===
The next full production of the show was at the Hamilton Stage in Rahway, New Jersey, produced by the American Theater Group. It opened November 6, 2013 and finished its scheduled run November 24, 2013 after fifteen performances. It was directed by Jen Wineman, music directed and orchestrated by Brent Crayon, and featured Chris McCarrell as Jimmy, Gerianne Pérez as Chloe, Erin Maguire as Mrs. Livingston, and Gabriel Sloyer as Slim. Also in the cast were Marrick Smith as Mark, Rachid Sabitri as Pushpahp, Alex Paul as Lorraine, Benjamin Howes as Mr. Livingston, Anita Welch as Shiny Girl, and Alex Chester as Deputy. Design team for this production was sound Jessica Paz, lighting Tom Rowe, costumes Elizabeth Barrett Groth and props, projection artwork and set Deb O.

=== Original cast recording ===
A studio cast recording featuring production and new orchestrations by Justin Goldner was recorded in 2016 for release in July 2017, with A.J. Holmes as Jimmy, Alice Ripley as Mrs. Livingston, and Caroline Bowman as Chloe. The album received positive reviews; British Theatre identified the "gorgeous" score and lyrics, adding: "I guarantee these are tunes you’ll find yourself humming after a single listen. Justin Goldner's fabulous orchestrations are delivered with jaunty panache by Matt Hinkley's fabulous band." A concert production of the studio cast was subsequently held at Feinstein's/54 Below in New York.

=== Wolfbane Productions ===
The professional premiere of Bubble Boy was at the Wolfbane Performing Arts Center (WolfPAC) in Appomattox, Virginia, produced by Wolfbane Productions. It opened September 22, 2016, and finished its scheduled run on October 15, 2016. It was directed by Dustin Williams and featured Andy Spencer as Jimmy, Melanie Brook as Chloe, Gabrielle Mirabella as Mrs. Livingston, Jacob Dickey as Slim, Hubbard Farr as Mark, and also included James Vessey-Potter, Jeff Price, Bev Owens, Kyle Blanchard, Kelly Malone Dudley, Bryan Paul Kopsitz, and Marianne Virnelson with musical direction by DaShay Glover, costume design by Christine Yepsen, lighting and sound design by Dustin Williams, and stage managed by Em Terlizzi. The writers, Cinco Paul and Ken Daurio, were in attendance to workshop the show with Wolfbane and to speak at local schools about the arts.

== Synopsis ==
Mrs. Livingston, a controlling conservative mother, tells us about how her son Jimmy was born with no immunities and grew up living in a plastic bubble ("Bubble Boy"). When Jimmy is a teenager, Chloe Molinski moves in next door and Jimmy instantly falls for her ("It Will Be Chloe"). Mrs. Livingston finds out and immediately tries to warn Jimmy away from her ("Stay Clean"), but in spite of her objection Jimmy and Chloe become friends, and Chloe even starts to develop romantic feelings for Jimmy ("Falling for the Boy"). But when Chloe shows up in his room drunk and a freaked out Jimmy rejects her advances ("Decontaminate Me"), Chloe turns to wannabe rocker Mark as her boyfriend ("Prom Night"). When Mark proposes at the prom, Chloe says yes, and then has to tell Jimmy, who tries to tell her not to go through with it, but can't muster the courage ("Please Stay"). She leaves behind an invitation to the wedding, which is at Niagara Falls, however, which inspires Jimmy to build a bubble suit and go stop the wedding and tell her how he feels ("Out of Here").

Out in the world for the first time, Jimmy meets up with the Bright and Shiny cult, led by Lorraine and Todd ("Bright and Shiny") and they give him a ride. But once he starts innocently pointing out the ridiculousness of their beliefs, they kick him off the bus and leave him in the middle of nowhere. Mrs. Livingston wakes up and finds that Jimmy's gone. She freaks out, calls 9-1-1, but gets no help and decides she and Mr. Livingston need to go find Jimmy themselves ("Bring Back My Boy"). Jimmy next meets up with a biker named Slim and his gang "Diablos del Diablo." Slim finds out about Jimmy's situation and tells him not to live in ("Regret"). Slim gives Jimmy a ride, but can only take him so far because he is "not welcome in the state of Nebraska." In the meantime, Chloe, Mark and his dimwitted best friend Shawn are at a wedding shop looking at dresses. Chloe can't find anything, and she wonders if maybe they should postpone the wedding and not rush into it, but Mark attempts to reassure her ("Something Called Forever"). Dropped off by Slim, Jimmy sees a redneck Sheriff and Deputy harassing an Indian ice cream man named Pushpahp and comes to his defense. He ends up accidentally tasering the officers, and he and Pushpahp take off together. While they drive, the Shinies find out from their leader Gil that Jimmy was the chosen one, and they need to find him, Slim finds out that the Sheriff is after Jimmy, and realizes he needs to help him, Chloe gets a message from Jimmy and decides to go track him down, and the Livingstons get a call from Mark letting them know Jimmy's general whereabouts ("Gotta Get That Boy").

Then Pushpahp hits a cow with his ice cream truck. He goes into denial ("It's an Elk") but realizes he needs to stay and atone and can't take Jimmy any further. Jimmy and Chloe, miles apart and feeling lost and alone, sing about the things holding them back from true happiness ("There's a Bubble Around My Heart"). Jimmy wakes up the next morning confronted by the Shinies. He responds by stealing their bus ("I Stole a Bus"). When the bus breaks down, he's found by his parents a mile away from the church where Chloe is getting married. Unable to fight his mom, he agrees to go home. He has a moment alone with his father, who's been silent the entire show, and then finally speaks up ("You Can See the Moon Today"), inspiring Jimmy to take off for the wedding ("One More Mile"). On the way the Shinies, Slim, Pushpahp, the Sheriff, and the Livingstons join in on the chase. When Jimmy arrives he stands up to Mark and tells Chloe how he feels, finally breaking out of his bubble suit ("I'd Rather Spend One Minute Holding You"). Chloe declares her love for Jimmy. And then he collapses to the floor, dying. The Livingstons arrive, and Mrs. Livingston accuses Chloe of killing Jimmy. Then Mr. Livingston says, "Tell him. Tell him everything." Mrs. Livingston reveals that Jimmy actually developed immunities when he was eight, but she didn't want him ruined "by the world and its filth," so she kept him inside where he'd be safe. Jimmy realizes he's not dead, forgives his mother, and then asks Chloe to marry him. She says yes, and everyone in the church celebrates ("Finale").

== Musical numbers ==
- "Bubble Boy" – Mrs. Livingston, Jimmy and Ensemble
- "It Will Be Chloe" – Jimmy
- "Stay Clean" – Mrs. Livingston and Jimmy
- "Falling for the Boy" – Chloe, Jimmy and Mrs. Livingston
- "Decontaminate Me" – Chloe and Jimmy
- "Prom Night" – Mark
- "It Will Be Mark" – Jimmy
- "Prom Night (Reprise)" – Ensemble
- "Falling for the Boy (Reprise)" – Chloe and Ensemble
- "Please Stay" – Jimmy and Chloe
- "Out of Here" – Jimmy and Ensemble
- "Bright and Shiny" – Lorraine and Ensemble
- "Bring Back My Boy" – Mrs. Livingston
- "Regret" – Slim and Ensemble
- "Something Called Forever" – Mark, Shawn and Chloe
- "Gotta Get That Boy" – Company
- "It's an Elk" – Pushpahp and Jimmy
- "There's a Bubble Around My Heart" – Jimmy and Chloe
- "I Stole a Bus" – Jimmy
- "You Can See the Moon Today" – Mr. Livingston
- "One More Mile" – Company
- "I'd Rather Spend One Minute Holding You" – Jimmy and Ensemble
- "Finale" – Company

== Notable casts ==
Character	Original cast recording †
Jimmy Livingston	A.J. Holmes
Mrs. Livingston	Alice Ripley
Mr. Livingston	Richard Kind
Chloe	Caroline Bowman
Mark	Matt Doyle
Lorraine	Kirsten Scott
Slim	Martin Sola
Shawn	Gerard Canonico
Pushpahp	Nehal Joshi

† This studio recording features a cast specifically assembled for the album who was also featured at a concert-style production at Feinstein's/54 Below. There were productions prior.

== Critical response ==
The Bubble Boy production in Rahway received generally favorable reviews. Ken Jaworski of The New York Times called it "a likable and lightweight show...with a sweet ending that is entirely in line with the rest of its good-natured story." Marina Kennedy of BroadwayWorld.com called it "a completely entertaining show that incorporates humor into a bizarre situation with a strong sense of humanity at its core." Bob Rendell of TalkinBroadway.com called it "a small, likable and lively contemporary pop fun-filled musical fantasy." However, Ronni Reich of The Star-Ledger said, "The melodies are generic, forgettable, and rarely go anywhere."
