= List of accolades received by Despicable Me 2 =

Despicable Me 2 accolades
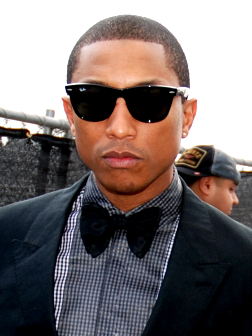
- Pharrell Williams garnered several accolades for composing the song "Happy".
Awards and nominations
Award	Wins	Nominations
3D Creative Arts Awards	0	1
Academy Awards	0	2
Alliance of Women Film Journalists Awards	0	1
American Cinema Editors Awards	0	1
Annie Awards	1	10
Black Reel Awards	0	1
British Academy Children's Awards	1	1
British Academy Film Awards	0	1
Cinema Audio Society Awards	0	1
Critics' Choice Movie Awards	0	2
Dallas-Fort Worth Film Critics Association Awards	0	1
Georgia Film Critics Association Awards	0	1
Golden Globe Awards	0	1
Golden Reel Awards	0	1
Golden Trailer Awards	2	4
Guild of Music Supervisors Awards	0	1
Hollywood Film Awards	0	1
Houston Film Critics Society Awards	0	1
ICG Publicists Awards	0	1
Kansas City Film Critics Circle Awards	1	1
Movieguide Awards	0	1
Nickelodeon Kids' Choice Awards	1	3
Online Film Critics Society Awards	0	1
People's Choice Awards	1	2
Producers Guild of America Awards	0	1
San Diego Film Critics Society Awards	0	1
San Francisco Film Critics Circle Awards	0	1
Satellite Awards	0	1
Saturn Awards	0	1
St. Louis Film Critics Association Awards	0	2
Teen Choice Awards	1	3
Visual Effects Society Awards	0	1
Washington D.C. Area Film Critics Association Awards	0	1
World Soundtrack Awards	1	1

Totals (Note: Certain award groups do not simply award one winner. They acknowledge several different recipients, have runners-up, and have third place. Since this is a specific recognition and is different from losing an award, runner-up mentions are considered wins in this award tally. For simplification and to avoid errors, each award in this list has been presumed to have had a prior nomination.)
- Wins: 9
- Nominations: 54

Despicable Me 2 is a 2013 American animated comedy film produced by Illumination Entertainment and distributed by Universal Pictures. The sequel to Despicable Me (2010), it was directed by Chris Renaud and Pierre Coffin, and written by Cinco Paul and Ken Daurio. Despicable Me 2 stars the voices of Steve Carell, Kristen Wiig, Benjamin Bratt, Miranda Cosgrove, Russell Brand, and Ken Jeong. In the film, secret agent Lucy Wilde (Wiig) recruits retired supervillain Gru (Carell) to investigate the theft of a powerful mutagen by El Macho (Bratt)—a supervillain who pursues world domination.

Despicable Me 2 debuted in Australia on June 5, 2013, and was released in the United States on July 3. Produced on a budget of $76 million, Despicable Me 2 grossed $970.8 million worldwide, finishing its theatrical run as the third-highest-grossing film of 2013. On the review aggregator website Rotten Tomatoes, the film holds an approval rating of 75% based on 184 reviews.

Despicable Me 2 garnered awards and nominations in various categories. It received two nominations at the 86th Academy Awards, including Best Animated Feature. The film won one of ten nominations at the 41st Annie Awards. At the 66th British Academy Film Awards, Despicable Me 2 was nominated for Best Animated Film. It received two nominations at the 19th Critics' Choice Awards. The film was nominated for Best Animated Feature Film at the 71st Golden Globe Awards.

== Accolades ==
Accolades received by Despicable Me 2
Award	Date of ceremony	Category	Recipient(s)	Result	Ref.
3D Creative Arts Awards	January 28, 2014	Best Feature Film – Animation	Despicable Me 2	Nominated	
Academy Awards	March 2, 2014	Best Animated Feature	Chris Renaud, Pierre Coffin, and Chris Meledandri	Nominated	
Academy Awards	March 2, 2014	Best Original Song	Pharrell Williams for "Happy"	Nominated	
Alliance of Women Film Journalists Awards	December 19, 2013	Best Animated Film	Despicable Me 2	Nominated	
American Cinema Editors Awards	February 7, 2014	Best Edited Animated Feature Film	Gregory Perler	Nominated	
Annie Awards	February 1, 2014	Best Animated Feature	Despicable Me 2	Nominated	
Annie Awards	February 1, 2014	Best Animated Television Commercial	"Despicable Me 2 – Cinemark"	Won	
Annie Awards	February 1, 2014	Outstanding Achievement for Character Animation in an Animated Feature Production	Jonathan Del Val	Nominated	
Annie Awards	February 1, 2014	Outstanding Achievement for Character Design in a Feature Production	Eric Guillon	Nominated	
Annie Awards	February 1, 2014	Outstanding Achievement for Music in an Animated Feature Production	Heitor Pereira and Pharrell Williams	Nominated	
Annie Awards	February 1, 2014	Outstanding Achievement for Production Design in an Animated Feature Production	Yarrow Cheney and Eric Guillon	Nominated	
Annie Awards	February 1, 2014	Outstanding Achievement for Storyboarding in an Animated Feature Production	Eric Favela	Nominated	
Annie Awards	February 1, 2014	Outstanding Achievement for Voice Acting in an Animated Feature Production	Kristen Wiig	Nominated	
Annie Awards	February 1, 2014	Outstanding Achievement for Voice Acting in an Animated Feature Production	Steve Carell	Nominated	
Annie Awards	February 1, 2014	Outstanding Achievement for Voice Acting in an Animated Feature Production	Pierre Coffin	Nominated	
Black Reel Awards	February 13, 2014	Best Original or Adapted Song	Pharrell Williams for "Happy"	Nominated	
British Academy Children's Awards	November 24, 2013	Kid's Vote — Film	Despicable Me 2	Won	
British Academy Film Awards	February 16, 2014	Best Animated Film	Chris Renaud and Pierre Coffin	Nominated	
Cinema Audio Society Awards	February 22, 2014	Outstanding Achievement in Sound Mixing for a Motion Picture – Animated	Charleen Richards, Tom Johnson, Gary A. Rizzo, Chris Scarabosio, Alan Meyerson, and Tony Eckert	Nominated	
Critics' Choice Movie Awards	January 16, 2014	Best Animated Feature	Despicable Me 2	Nominated	
Critics' Choice Movie Awards	January 16, 2014	Best Song	Pharrell Williams for "Happy"	Nominated	
Dallas-Fort Worth Film Critics Association Awards	December 16, 2013	Best Animated Film	Despicable Me 2	Nominated	
Georgia Film Critics Association Awards	January 10, 2014	Best Animated Film	Despicable Me 2	Nominated	
Golden Globe Awards	January 12, 2014	Best Animated Feature Film	Despicable Me 2	Nominated	
Golden Reel Awards	February 16, 2014	Outstanding Achievement in Sound Editing – Sound Effects, Foley, Dialogue and ADR for Animated Feature Film	Dennis Leonard and Christopher Scarabosio	Nominated	
Golden Trailer Awards	May 3, 2013	Best Animation/Family Poster	Despicable Me 2 (Cimarron Entertainment)	Nominated	
Golden Trailer Awards	May 30, 2014	Best Animation/Family Poster	"Side by Side Billboard" (Ignition)	Won	
Golden Trailer Awards	May 30, 2014	Best Animation/Family TV Spot	"Chicken Revised" (Workshop Creative)	Nominated	
Golden Trailer Awards	May 30, 2014	Best Standee for a Feature Film	"Whack-a-Minion Standee" (Ignition)	Won	
Guild of Music Supervisors Awards	February 26, 2014	Best Film Studio Music Department	Universal Pictures (Note: Also for the studio's 2013 films About Time, The Best Man Holiday, Fast & Furious 6, Identity Thief, Kick-Ass 2, Riddick, and Rush)	Nominated	
Hollywood Film Awards	October 21, 2013	Hollywood Movie Award	Despicable Me 2	Nominated	
Houston Film Critics Society Awards	December 15, 2013	Best Animated Film	Despicable Me 2	Nominated	
ICG Publicists Awards	February 28, 2014	Maxwell Weinberg Publicists Showmanship Motion Picture Award	Despicable Me 2	Nominated	
Kansas City Film Critics Circle Awards	December 15, 2013	Best Animated Feature	Despicable Me 2	Won (Note: Tied with Frozen (2013))	
Movieguide Awards	February 7, 2014	Best Movie for Families	Despicable Me 2	Nominated	
Nickelodeon Kids' Choice Awards	March 29, 2014	Favorite Animated Movie	Despicable Me 2	Nominated	
Nickelodeon Kids' Choice Awards	March 29, 2014	Favorite Voice from an Animated Movie	Steve Carell	Nominated	
Nickelodeon Kids' Choice Awards	March 29, 2014	Favorite Voice from an Animated Movie	Miranda Cosgrove	Won	
Online Film Critics Society Awards	December 16, 2013	Best Animated Film	Despicable Me 2	Nominated	
People's Choice Awards	January 8, 2014	Favorite Family Movie	Despicable Me 2	Won	
People's Choice Awards	January 8, 2014	Favorite Movie	Despicable Me 2	Nominated	
Producers Guild of America Awards	January 19, 2014	Best Animated Motion Picture	Janet Healy and Chris Meledandri	Nominated	
San Diego Film Critics Society Awards	December 11, 2013	Best Animated Film	Despicable Me 2	Nominated	
San Francisco Film Critics Circle Awards	December 15, 2013	Best Animated Feature	Despicable Me 2	Nominated	
Satellite Awards	February 23, 2014	Best Original Song	Pharrell Williams for "Happy"	Nominated	
Saturn Awards	June 26, 2014	Best Animated Film	Despicable Me 2	Nominated	
St. Louis Film Critics Association Awards	December 14, 2013	Best Animated Feature	Despicable Me 2	Nominated	
St. Louis Film Critics Association Awards	December 14, 2013	Best Soundtrack	Despicable Me 2	Nominated	
Teen Choice Awards	August 11, 2013	Choice Summer Movie: Comedy	Despicable Me 2	Won	
Teen Choice Awards	August 11, 2013	Choice Movie: Hissy Fit	Steve Carell	Nominated	
Teen Choice Awards	August 10, 2014	Choice Music Single: Male	Pharrell Williams for "Happy"	Nominated	
Visual Effects Society Awards	February 12, 2014	Outstanding Visual Effects in an Animated Feature	Chris Meledandri, Janet Healy, Chris Renaud, and Pierre Coffin	Nominated	
Washington D.C. Area Film Critics Association Awards	December 8, 2013	Best Animated Feature	Despicable Me 2	Nominated	
World Soundtrack Awards	October 25, 2014	Best Original Song Written Directly for a Film	Pharrell Williams for "Happy"	Won	
