= Brent Crayon =

American pianist and musical director

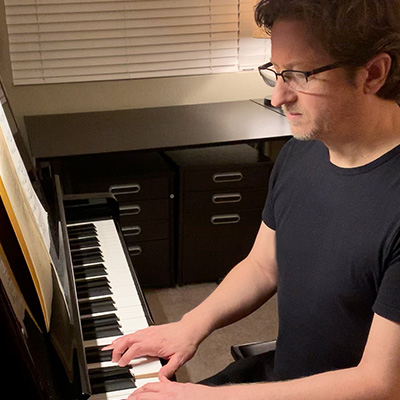
- Brent Crayon

Background information
- Born: New Orleans, Louisiana, U.S.
- Genres: Musical theatre
- Occupations: pianist, musical director, orchestrator, copyist, educator
- Instruments: piano, keyboards
- Years active: 1997–present

Brent Crayon is an American pianist, musical director, orchestrator and copyist.

== Early life and education ==
Crayon was born and grew up in New Orleans, Louisiana. He graduated from Loyola University New Orleans with a Bachelor of Music degree in music performance, in 1995. He subsequently earned a Master of Fine Arts in piano performance from the California Institute of the Arts, in Valencia, California, in 1997.

== Musical director ==
Crayon began his musical career as a trained classical pianist. After serving as the musical director for several productions at the Rubicon Theatre in Ventura, California and elsewhere, he made his Los Angeles theatrical debut at the Mark Taper Forum, with the pre-Broadway revival of Flower Drum Song, in 2001. Since then, he subsequently musical directed productions of Les Miserables in Alaska, Dreamgirls in Tokyo, Jacques Brel is Alive and Well and Living in Paris, Ecstasy, the Musical,, A Class Act, Triumph of Love, The Spitfire Grill, The Fantasticks, West Side Story and others.

=== Major collaborations ===
Crayon has worked and collaborated with several prominent composers and artists, including Stephen Schwartz, John Bucchino, Paul Gordon, Jason Robert Brown and directors Richard Maltby, Jr., Chen Shi-Zheng and John Caird among others. He was the musical director for the world premieres of It’s Only Life, Bubble Boy: The Musical, Snapshots When Garbo Talks and The Devil and Daisy Jane; the associate musical director for the world premiere of Empire, the Musical; and the musical director of the west coast premieres of First Date, Songs for a New World and Tick, Tick... Boom! and the Los Angeles premiere of A Catered Affair.

Crayon also served as the musical director, performing with the Upright Cabaret band, for the west coast debut of composers Kait Kerrigan and Bree Lowdermilk songs, which featured performers Sarah Hyland, Melissa Benoist, Barrett Foa, Max Ehrich, Dezmond Meeks, Meghann Fahy, Laura Dickinson, Matt Sax, Morgan Karr, Arielle Jacobs, Colleen Ballinger and others.

== Piano soloist ==
As a featured piano soloist, Crayon has performed with the Ventura Chamber Orchestra, the Long Beach Symphony and the Santa Monica Symphony.

== Composer ==
In 1998, he served as the composer for an original children's theatre production of Rapunzel, based on the German fairy tale, which was successfully performed in repertory.

== Teaching ==
Crayon is also an accomplished accompanist and has been a summer program faculty member at the Idyllwild Arts Academy, in Idyllwild, California. He has also been on the staff of El Camino College, in Torrance, California, serving as the musical director and conductor.

== Recordings ==
He served as an orchestrator on the original cast recording of the musical, Bubble Boy, by the writing team of Cinco Paul and Ken Daurio. He also played the synthesizer for the album Michael Byron: Music Of Nights Without Moon Or Pearl, featuring the music of composer Michael Byron.

== Awards ==
In 2015, Crayon was nominated for an Ovation Award for Best Musical Direction for his work on The Last Five Years at the Rubicon Theatre in Ventura, California. He was previously nominated for an Ovation Award in 2005, in the same category for Songs For a New World, also at the Rubicon Theatre. A 2010 production of this musical at the International City Theatre in Long Beach, also garnered Crayon a Los Angeles Drama Critics Circle Award nomination.

In 2008, Crayon won a DayTony Award for Best Musical Direction for his work on Snapshots at the Human Race & Victoria Theatre, in Dayton, Ohio. In 2011, he was nominated for an NAACP Theatre Award, in the category of Best Music Director for Jacques Brel is Alive and Well And Living in Paris at the Colony Theatre in Burbank, California.
