= Bubble Boy (film) =

2001 comedy film

- Theatrical release poster
- Directed by: Blair Hayes
- Written by: Cinco Paul and Ken Daurio
- Produced by: Beau Flynn
- Starring: Jake Gyllenhaal; Swoosie Kurtz; Marley Shelton; Danny Trejo; John Carroll Lynch
- Cinematography: Jerzy Zieliński
- Edited by: Pamela Martin
- Music by: John Ottman
- Production companies: Touchstone Pictures; Bandeira Entertainment
- Distributed by: Buena Vista Pictures Distribution
- Release date: August 24, 2001
- Running time: 84 minutes
- Country: United States
- Language: English
- Budget: $13 million
- Box office: $5 million

Bubble Boy is a 2001 American comedy film starring Jake Gyllenhaal in the title role. Written by Cinco Paul and Ken Daurio, and directed by Blair Hayes (in his feature directorial debut), it was inspired by the 1976 film The Boy in the Plastic Bubble. The story follows Jimmy (Gyllenhaal), a young man born without an immune system who has lived in a sterilized dome since childhood. He ventures outside his home for the first time to stop the wedding of his crush Chloe (Marley Shelton), after she is revealed to have mutual feelings for him. Swoosie Kurtz, Danny Trejo, and John Carroll Lynch also star.

Bubble Boy was released on August 24, 2001, and it received mixed reviews from critic and was a box office failure. But starting in its home video release (and later on in its television airings and later home video and subsequent digital streaming releases), it became a "cult comedy classic". A musical adaptation, written by the same authors, was first performed in 2008.

== Plot ==
Born without an immune system, Jimmy Livingston lives in a sterilized dome in his bedroom in his home in California, earning him the nickname "Bubble Boy" by his neighbors. His overbearing and devout Christian mother only exposes him to Highlights magazine and Land of the Lost for entertainment. When he is a teenager, Jimmy is immediately taken with Chloe, who moves in next door, and the two become friends despite his mother's discouragement. When Chloe leaves for Niagara Falls to marry her boyfriend Mark in three days' time, Jimmy realizes that Chloe cares for him and builds a mobile bubble suit, determined to stop the wedding.

Along the way, Jimmy is picked up by a cult called Bright and Shiny but is abandoned in the desert when he offends them. He finds a new ride with Slim, a biker who speaks fondly of his old flame "Wildfire" upon hearing Jimmy's story. The Livingstons pursue Jimmy, along with the cult members; their leader, Gil, believes "The Round One" to be the group's messiah. Jimmy leaves a distracted Slim behind in Las Vegas and continues on using a scooter he wins at a casino. Encountering his parents on the road, Jimmy is struck by their vehicle and bounces aboard a train belonging to Dr. Phreak, who shows "freaks" to the public for money. When Phreak tries to recruit Jimmy, Jimmy knocks him unconscious, which allows the freaks to go their own way. They choose to trail Jimmy along with the other parties in pursuit.

Jimmy is picked up by Pushpop, an Indian ice cream truck driver, who hits a cow on the road. Pushpop is devastated, but Jimmy insults his Hindu beliefs, causing Pushpop to angrily force Jimmy to continue on foot. Winning $500 in a mud wrestling competition, Jimmy pays taxi driver Pappy for a ride, but is cornered by the cult members. He slips away during the group's skirmish with the freaks and Slim's gang. After Pappy appears to have died at the wheel, Jimmy tries to call Chloe from a gas station in New York, only to reach her fiancé Mark, who rudely convinces him that Chloe does not love him. Discouraged, Jimmy intends to return home with his parents, but encouragement and an opening provided by his father Morton allows him to escape on a plane piloted by Pappy's twin brother Pippy.

When Pippy seemingly dies over Niagara Falls, Jimmy survives the fall and arrives at the church in time to stop the wedding. Abandoning his bubble suit, he embraces and kisses Chloe before collapsing. Jimmy's parents rush in along with the cultists, freaks, and Slim's crew. At Morton's insistence, Mrs. Livingston confesses that he had developed an immune system when he was four and has been perfectly fine all along. She had kept him isolated only due to her overprotective nature.

Jimmy and Chloe are married with all the people encountered during his adventure in attendance. Recognized as the former "Wildfire," Mrs. Livingston re-embraces her rebellious side and prepares to depart with Slim on his bike along with Morton. the Bright and Shiny cult embrace Pushpop as their new leader, and Jimmy and Chloe discover Pippy and Pappy – both of whom merely fell asleep instead of dying – along with their paramour, Poonani, as they ride off to begin their honeymoon.

== Cast ==
- Jake Gyllenhaal as Jimmy Livingston
- Swoosie Kurtz as Mrs. Livingston / Wildfire
- Marley Shelton as Chloe
- Danny Trejo as Slim
- John Carroll Lynch as Morton Livingston
- Verne Troyer as Dr. Phreak
- Dave Sheridan as Mark
- Brian George as Pushpop
- Patrick Cranshaw as Pappy and Pippy
- Ever Carradine as Lisa
- Beetlejuice as Lil' Zip
- Fabio Lanzoni as Gil
- Zach Galifianakis as bus stop man
- Arden Myrin as Lorraine
- Pablo Schreiber as Todd
- Matthew McGrory as human Sasquatch / Clark
- Stacy Keibler as working girl
- Madajah McCullum O'Hearn as Red Hot

== Production ==
In June 2000, the Walt Disney Company greenlit Bubble Boy, which was penned by Cinco Paul and Ken Daurio, with rewrites from Michael Kalesniko, and based on an original idea by producer Beau Flynn. The following month, Blair Hayes was appointed to helm the project, marking his feature directorial debut.

In August 2000, Jake Gyllenhaal was signed on to play the lead role.

== Reception ==
=== Box office ===
The film opened #13 at the U.S. Box office in 1,605 theatres, taking in $2,038,349 in its opening weekend, and the film would close its run on October 7 with a domestic total of $5,007,898. On a budget of $13 million, the film was a box office bomb.

=== Critical reception ===
On the review aggregator website Rotten Tomatoes, 32% of 85 critics' reviews are positive, with an average rating of 4.1/10. The website's consensus reads: "Bubble Boy bounces along with lame, offensive jokes that are more tasteless than funny." Metacritic, which uses a weighted average, assigned the film a score of 41 out of 100, based on 21 critics, indicating "mixed or average" reviews. Audiences polled by CinemaScore gave the film an average grade of "B" on an A+ to F scale.

=== Controversy ===
The film was the center of a brief controversy for downplaying the effects of severe combined immunodeficiency (SCID) for the purposes of comedy.

== Musical adaptation ==
In 2008, Paul and Daurio adapted Bubble Boy into a stage musical featuring original songs written by the former. A professional production started in 2013, for which an original cast recording was released on Ghostlight Records in 2017 featuring A.J. Holmes, Alice Ripley and Richard Kind, produced by Paul, Justin Goldner and Kurt Deutsch.
