= Despicable Me 4 =

2024 American animated film

- Theatrical release poster
- Directed by: Chris Renaud
- Written by: Mike White; Ken Daurio
- Produced by: Chris Meledandri; Brett Hoffman
- Starring: Steve Carell; Kristen Wiig; Pierre Coffin; Joey King; Miranda Cosgrove; Stephen Colbert; Sofía Vergara; Will Ferrell
- Edited by: Tiffany Hillkurtz
- Music by: Heitor Pereira
- Production companies: Universal Pictures; Illumination
- Distributed by: Universal Pictures
- Release dates: June 9, 2024 (Jazz at Lincoln Center); July 3, 2024 (United States)
- Running time: 94 minutes
- Country: United States
- Language: English
- Budget: $100 million
- Box office: $986.7 million

Despicable Me 4 is a 2024 American animated comedy film directed by Chris Renaud and written by Mike White and Ken Daurio. Produced by Universal Pictures and Illumination, it is the fourth main installment in the Despicable Me franchise and the sixth overall installment. The film stars the voices of Steve Carell, Kristen Wiig, Pierre Coffin, Joey King, Miranda Cosgrove, Stephen Colbert, Sofía Vergara, and Will Ferrell. Taking place after the events of Despicable Me 3 (2017), the film sees reformed supervillain and secret agent Gru temporarily relocating his family to a safe house when his old rival, Maxime Le Mal (Ferrell), seeks revenge. Meanwhile, some of Gru's Minions are augmented with superpowers from the Anti-Villain League (AVL), forming a superhero initiative known as the Mega Minions.

Development on a fourth main Despicable Me film began in September 2017 after the release of the third film. It was officially confirmed in February 2022, with Renaud, Patrick Delage, and White attached as director, co-director, and writer, respectively. Production was underway by June 2022. Most of the main voice cast was announced in January 2024, with Brett Hoffman and Daurio revealed as co-producer and co-writer, respectively, with Chris Meledandri and White. Heitor Pereira and Pharrell Williams returned from previous instalments to compose the score and write original songs and themes, respectively.

Despicable Me 4 debuted at the Jazz at Lincoln Center in New York on June 9, 2024, and was theatrically released in the United States on July 3 by Universal Pictures. Despite mixed reviews, the film continued the franchise's streak of box-office successes, grossing $986.7 million worldwide against a budget of $100 million, making it the fourth-highest-grossing film of 2024.

== Plot ==
Former supervillain and undercover Anti-Villain League (AVL) Agent Gru, attends a class reunion at his alma mater Lycée Pas Bon School of Villainy (Not Good High School of Villainy), where he reunites with Maxime Le Mal, a former classmate of his who has a feud with Gru who he believes stole his talent show act. During the ceremony, Maxime reveals he has enhanced himself with cockroach body parts, but Gru has him arrested by the AVL. Helped by his cockroach minions, Maxime somehow manages to escape his maximum security prison to get revenge on Gru and reveals his new invention: a ray gun that transforms people into cockroach hybrids, which he plans to use specifically on Gru's infant son Gru Jr.

Days later, Silas Ramsbottom, former Head of the AVL and has recently come out of retirement, visits the Gru-Wilde household to inform them that Maxime has escaped and that the AVL will need to temporarily relocate the family to a safe house in another town called Mayflower, under new identities. Meanwhile, the AVL take in most of the Minions, and Silas selects five of them to be augmented with superpowers under a new initiative called the Mega Minions. However, the initiative is called off after the group unintentionally causes significant collateral damage in a nearby city.

In their new well-off residential town, Gru and his family meet their new neighbors, the Prescotts, Perry and Patsy, and their teenage daughter Poppy. Poppy, an aspiring villain, recognizes Gru from his former villainous career and threatens to blow his cover unless he helps her pull a heist to steal Lycée Pas Bon's honey badger mascot Lenny. With the help of two Minions and Gru Jr., they successfully steal Lenny from the school, unaware that Lenny's collar contains a tracking device. The school's principal Übelschlecht identifies Gru via security camera footage and contacts Maxime to inform him about Gru's whereabouts.

The next day, Gru and Lucy are away at tennis practice with Poppy's parents, leaving Poppy to watch over the girls and Gru Jr. When Übelschlecht visits the safe house to interrogate them about Gru and to try and get Lenny back, Poppy sneaks away with Lenny. Gru and Lucy then rush back home when they discover their cover has been blown, after being alerted by Margo and they fight Übelschlecht. Lucy also signals the AVL, who call the Mega Minions out of retirement to help stop Maxime. In the havoc, Gru Jr. leaves the house and is spotted by Maxime and his girlfriend Valentina, who kidnap the baby. Lucy and the girls stay behind to handle Übelschlecht as Gru decides to save his son with help from Poppy.

Gru and Poppy use a flying car they had commandeered during their heist, and Poppy steers into position so Gru can board Maxime's ship and crash it into a building under construction. Maxime reveals he has brainwashed and turned Gru Jr. into a human-cockroach hybrid and they fight Gru off. Gru is wounded and almost thrown off of the building, but his encouraging words to his son manage to break Gru Jr. free from his brainwashing state and he attacks Maxime instead. Gru punches Maxime off the building to the ground, where he is further harmed by the Mega Minions who arrive in turn, the AVL then arrest Maxime and Valentina.

Reunited with Lucy and the girls, Gru Jr. finally calls Gru "Dada." The family returns to their original home, legally adopting Lenny as a pet, and Dr. Nefario reverses Gru Jr.'s transformation. Some time later, Gru visits Maxime in an AVL prison to talk and settle their differences. The rivals then put on a performance of "Everybody Wants to Rule the World" for the prisoners, which include villains from the past, while Poppy is accepted at Lycée Pas Bon.

== Voice cast ==
- Steve Carell as Gru, a former supervillain turned Anti-Villain League agent
- Kristen Wiig as Lucy Wilde, an Anti-Villain League agent and Gru's wife
- Will Ferrell as Maxime Le Mal, a French-accented, cockroach-themed supervillain and high school rival of Gru
- Tara Strong as Gru Jr., Gru and Lucy's youngest child
- Joey King as Poppy Prescott, an aspiring supervillainess and admirer of Gru
- Stephen Colbert as Perry Prescott, Poppy's father and Gru's new neighbor
- Chloe Fineman as Patsy Prescott, Poppy's mother
- Sofía Vergara as Valentina, Maxime's femme fatale girlfriend
- Miranda Cosgrove as Margo, the oldest daughter of Gru and Lucy
- Dana Gaier as Edith, the middle daughter of Gru and Lucy
- Madison Polan as Agnes, the youngest daughter of Gru and Lucy
- Pierre Coffin as the Minions, who are:

- Dave, a very tall, and wide two eyed mega minion who is strong
- Gus, a short two eyed mega minion who resembles a bullet
- Mel, an average height one eyed mega minion who has a laser beam eye
- Tim, a very tall, and narrow two eyed mega minion who can stretch
- Jerry, a tall, and wide one eyed mega minion who can swallow things

- Steve Coogan as Silas Ramsbottom, the previously retired director of the Anti-Villain League
- Chris Renaud as Principal Frau Übelschlecht, the elderly principal of Lycée Pas Bon

Additionally, John DiMaggio, who previously voiced one of Wild Knuckles' former henchmen in Minions: The Rise of Gru (2022) and a Scoutmaster in the Minion Scouts animated short, voices Karl, the angry bus driver who works for the AVL transporting the remaining Minions to their new destination. Laraine Newman voices Melora, a salon customer whose hair was accidentally burned by Lucy and seeks revenge, Brad Ableson voices Sensei O'Sullivan, Agnes and Edith's karate teacher, and Romesh Ranganathan voices Dr. Nefario, Gru's elderly scientist and assistant. Ranganathan replaces Nefario's long-time voice actor, Russell Brand, due to sexual assault allegations with the latter.

Cameos at the end of the film include several returning villains like Vector, El Macho, and Balthazar Bratt with Jason Segel, Benjamin Bratt, and Trey Parker respectively reprising their roles through archive audio. Silent cameos include Gru's neighbor, Fred McDade, his mother Marlena, and his twin brother Dru, as well as several villains from the previous installments of the franchise including Vector's father Mr. Perkins, Scarlet and Herb Overkill, and the surviving members of the Vicious 6.

== Production ==
=== Development ===
Development on Despicable Me 4 began in September 2017 following the release of Despicable Me 3, with longtime Despicable Me and Illumination writers Cinco Paul and Ken Daurio writing early drafts of the script. The film was officially confirmed in February 2022, with veteran Despicable Me director Chris Renaud, Patrick Delage, and Mike White attached as director, co-director, and writer, respectively, and a July 3, 2024, release date announced. Production was underway by June 2022, with Steve Carell starting his voice recording after a "couple of sessions". Most of the production was done during the COVID-19 pandemic. In January 2024, it was announced that The Super Mario Bros. Movie (2023) executive producer Brett Hoffman and Daurio had been added as co-producer and co-writer, respectively.

=== Writing ===
White wrote the screenplay of Despicable Me 4 with Daurio, who joined him later in the production. The filmmakers aimed to delve deeper into multiple elements to improve the story's stability, since Minions: The Rise of Gru was delayed to July 2022 due to the COVID-19 pandemic. Renaud and White had ideas for the narrative including Gru and his family being forced into witness protection and Gru's rogue rival from high school; they were intended to foster a connection with the audience, depending on each subplot focus.

An abandoned Mega Minions idea from Despicable Me 2 (2013) was resurrected for Despicable Me 4. The filmmakers researched initial concepts of the idea, taking inspiration from the Marvel Comics team Fantastic Four and the Pixar film The Incredibles (2004). To make the Mega Minions unique from the majority of media featuring superheroes, Renaud incorporated the Minions' characteristics—including their incompetence—into the Mega Minions.

=== Casting ===
In January 2024, it was announced that Carell, Kristen Wiig, Miranda Cosgrove, Dana Gaier, Pierre Coffin, and Steve Coogan would return to reprise their respective roles as Gru, Lucy Wilde, Margo, Edith, the Minions, and Silas Ramsbottom, while Will Ferrell, Joey King, Sofía Vergara, Stephen Colbert, Chloe Fineman, and Madison Polan (replacing Nev Scharrel who had in turn replaced Elsie Fisher) would join the voice cast, respectively voicing Maxime Le Mal, Poppy Prescott, Valentina, Perry Prescott, Patsy Prescott, and Agnes.

=== Animation ===
According to Renaud, some of the characters who appeared in previous films had their character rigs and surfaces updated for this film. Fred McDade, who had not appeared since the second film, was recreated from scratch, as his character model was too old. The sequence where Poppy plays with an arcade machine originally started out as an animation test for the character, but the filmmakers liked the sequence so much that it was added to the final cut of the film.

== Music ==
In March 2024, Heitor Pereira was announced to be composing the film's score, returning from the previous installments. Pharrell Williams was also confirmed to be returning to co-compose the score with Pereira as well as to write new songs. The original soundtrack was released on June 27, 2024, by Back Lot Music.

== Marketing and release ==
The first trailer for the film was released on January 28, 2024, during the 2023–24 NFL playoff championship games. The trailer features the songs "Sweet Child O' Mine" by Guns N' Roses and "Maneater" by Hall & Oates, as well as in television showings, "Through the Fire and Flames" by DragonForce. CBR reported that the trailer showcased "the struggles of welcoming in a new member of the Gru family" and included the debut of Will Ferrell's Maxime Le Mal. Screen Rant's Brennan Klein observed that Gru's tumultuous relationship with his son, Gru Jr., contrasted with the good relationship with his adopted daughters. An additional trailer was revealed on February 11 during Super Bowl LVIII, being narrated by Jon Hamm, who previously voiced Herb Overkill in the 2015 spin-off film Minions, and featuring cameos by Ferrell and Steve Carell. Ryan Gajewski of The Hollywood Reporter said the trailer appeared to "tout the benefits of modern technology but feature strange images supposedly generated by AI," enjoying the Renaissance-era-inspired poses of Ferrell and Carell in the trailer. On April 10, at CinemaCon, Universal displayed a clip of Gru and Poppy trying to steal a honey badger. Brennan Kline of Screen Rant appreciated that the clip solidified the "important element" of Gru's domestic family man status in the sequel.

The second trailer was released on May 7, 2024. Writing for TheWrap, Drew Taylor called the trailer "Minions-heavy" and pointed out one of Pharrell Williams' new original songs featured in the trailer. Collider noted the "devastating consequences" of enlisting a small group of Minion volunteers for an experiment that gave them superpowers. Journalist Diego Peralta pointed out a sequence in which one of the super-powered minions destroys a part of their base with laser vision and said that villains Maxime and Valentina "are more dangerous than any threat Gru has faced before".

On June 8, 2024, Illumination released a parody teaser for the film in which Steve Carell announces the Megaverse, a parody of shared universes such as the Marvel Cinematic Universe (MCU) and DC Extended Universe (DCEU), by claiming that Illumination would release 100 years' worth of films, television series, and stage productions starring the Mega Minions. Illumination also published a website for the Megaverse. Some of the fake productions listed on the site include Mega Minions: The Tax Write-Off and an untitled Mega Minions spin-off series with a "story to be determined based on rigorous market testing and ad hoc decision-making." The stunt referenced several Hollywood controversies, such as the cancellation of Warner Bros. films like Batgirl, Scoob! Holiday Haunt and Coyote vs. Acme and the failure of the 2022 DCEU film Black Adam, as well as the mixed reception to Disney's live-action remakes of their classic animated films and several recent MCU productions, such as Ant-Man and the Wasp: Quantumania and Secret Invasion.

Despicable Me 4 debuted at the Jazz at Lincoln Center in New York City on June 9, 2024, followed by a premiere on June 13, at the Annecy International Animation Film Festival. The film was released in the United States on July 3.

=== Home media ===
Universal Pictures Home Entertainment released Despicable Me 4 for digital download on September 10, 2024, and on 4K Ultra HD Blu-ray, Blu-ray, and DVD on September 24. Physical copies contain behind-the-scenes featurettes, deleted scenes, recreational activities, an overview of the franchise's adversaries, and two short films—Game Over and Over and Benny's Birthday.

The film was made available to stream on NBCUniversal's Peacock streaming service on October 31, 2024. As part of an 18-month deal with Netflix for animated films from Universal, the film is streaming on Peacock for the first four months of the pay-TV window, before moving to Netflix for the next ten beginning on February 28, 2025.

== Reception ==
=== Box office ===
Despicable Me 4 grossed $361 million in the United States and Canada, and $625.7 million in other territories, for a worldwide total of $986.7 million. Deadline Hollywood calculated the film's net profit as $370 million, accounting for production budgets, marketing, talent participations and other costs; box office grosses, television and streaming, and home media revenues, making Despicable Me 4 the fourth-most profitable film of 2024.

In the United States and Canada, Despicable Me 4 was projected to gross $100–125 million from 4,030 theaters in its five-day opening weekend. The film made $27 million on its first day and $20.4 million on its second. It went on to debut to $75 million over the traditional three-day weekend, along with a total five-day gross of $122.6 million, topping the box office. The film made $43.6 million the following weekend, remaining in first place. In its third weekend the film made $24.4 million, finishing in second behind newcomer and Universal's own Twisters, and then made $14.6 million in its fourth weekend, finishing in third behind Twisters and Deadpool & Wolverine. Despicable Me 4 ended its box office run as the fifth highest-grossing film of 2024 in the U.S. and Canada.

Internationally, the film opened in different countries with different dates, with Australia being the earliest country to release it. The film opened big in multiple countries, and in some it settled franchise records, though in many countries that it opened prior to its US release date, the film opened second behind Inside Out 2, slowing its international climb.

=== Critical response ===
On the review aggregator website Rotten Tomatoes, 56% of 166 critics' reviews are positive, with an average rating of 5.6/10. The website's consensus reads: "Fast paced and teeming with slapstick gags, Despicable Me 4 is as overstuffed as a piñata but full of enough candy to give audiences an enjoyable sugar rush." Metacritic, which uses a weighted average, assigned the film a score of 52 out of 100, based on 36 critics, indicating "mixed or average" reviews. Audiences polled by CinemaScore gave the film an average grade of "A" on an A+ to F scale (same as the first two films), while those surveyed by PostTrak gave the film an 82% positive score, with 63% saying they would definitely recommend it.

Variety admitted the film is entertaining but found the plot overcrowded with useless characters: "One thing is absolutely certain: We haven't seen the last of these characters, even if we might prefer that a few of them sit out the next sequel—like the Mega Minions, who aren't nearly as cute as they sound." A similar appraisal can be found in Screen Rant, as well as in The Hollywood Reporter, observing, for example, the underdeveloped role of the villain in the midst of the various plot lines: "Running a brisk 95 minutes, Despicable Me 4 doesn't leave enough time for Maxime to enact his plans in a way that packs an emotional punch." ABC News commented: "Should a review of a Despicable Me movie be a thoughtful analysis or just a list of the funny stuff the Minions do in it? As much as I might believe in the value of film criticism, I kind of suspect that even the finest points of assessment would be dismantled about as fast as a Minion can say 'Bello!'"

== Accolades ==
Accolades received by Despicable Me 4
Award	Date of ceremony	Category	Recipient(s)	Result	Ref.
15th Hollywood Music in Media Awards	November 20, 2024	Original Song in an Animated Film	"Double Life"	Nominated	
52nd Annie Awards	February 8, 2025	Outstanding Achievement for Storyboarding in an Animated Feature Production	Habib Louati	Won	
52nd Saturn Awards	February 2, 2025	Best Animated Film	Despicable Me 4	Nominated	
2025 Movieguide Awards	March 6, 2025	Best Movie for Families	Despicable Me 4	Nominated	
2025 Kids' Choice Awards	June 21, 2025	Favorite Animated Movie	Despicable Me 4	Nominated	
2025 Kids' Choice Awards	June 21, 2025	Favorite Male Voice From An Animated Movie	Steve Carell	Nominated	
2025 Kids' Choice Awards	June 21, 2025	Favorite Male Voice From An Animated Movie	Will Ferrell	Nominated	
2025 Kids' Choice Awards	June 21, 2025	Favorite Female Voice From An Animated Movie	Kristen Wiig	Nominated	

=== Viewership ===
According to data from Showlabs, Despicable Me 4 ranked fourth on Netflix in the United States during the week of 24 February–2 March 2025.

== Future ==
=== Possible sequel ===
Chris Renaud hints that Despicable Me 5 is "possible" if a fresh story can be crafted for the Despicable Me franchise's future. Steve Carell told Yahoo that he'd be more than happy to head up a new film in the franchise. He even has some ideas of what he'd like to see in the sequel, though he's always ready to defer to the creative team's judgement on the matter.
