= Hot Air (film) =

2019 comedy-drama film directed by Frank Coraci

- Theatrical release poster
- Directed by: Frank Coraci
- Written by: Will Reichel
- Produced by: Aimee Keen; Frank Coraci; Susan Leber
- Starring: Steve Coogan; Taylor Russell; Neve Campbell; Griffin Newman; Judith Light; Skylar Astin
- Cinematography: Frank Prinzi
- Edited by: Tom Lewis
- Music by: Rupert Gregson-Williams
- Production companies: Great Point Media; Spanknyce Films; Juror Number 7 Films; Taphae Productions Ltd.
- Distributed by: Lionsgate; Freestyle Releasing
- Release date: August 23, 2019
- Running time: 99 minutes
- Country: United States
- Language: English

Hot Air is a 2019 American comedy-drama film directed by Frank Coraci, written by Will Reichel, and starring Steve Coogan, Taylor Russell and Neve Campbell. The plot follows a conservative talk radio host (Coogan), whose life and worldview is upended by the arrival of his biracial 16-year-old niece. The film was theatrically released in the United States on August 23, 2019, by Freestyle Releasing and Lionsgate.

== Plot ==
Lionel Macomb is an abrasive conservative talk personality, who hosts a popular eponymous daily radio show in which he regularly lobs insults at callers and politicians who disagree with his views. Long estranged from his addict sister Laurie, her half-African American/half-Caucasian 16-year-old daughter, Tess, seeks out Lionel—as he is her only living relative not afflicted by substance abuse—at his upscale Manhattan apartment following her mother's relapse, which sent Laurie back to rehab. After introducing herself to her uncle, whom she never previously met, after walking in on him having a sexual affair with his maid, Tess convinces Lionel to let her stay by threatening to tweet about his heartless actions when he tries to deny her a place to stay; forgoing his "pick-yourself-up-by-the-bootstraps" beliefs against providing charity or any outside help, he relents and gives Tess the spare bedroom in his apartment. Tess receives support from Lionel's publicist and girlfriend Val, who tries to see the good in Lionel despite his gruff, hardline persona. Tess reveals to Val that, after expressing hesitance to leave her ailing mother, she had made a deal with Laurie to attend the prestigious Harper Academy if her mother enters and completes rehab.

Ratings for Lionel's program are beginning to decline as viewers begin to tire of his abrasive style and flock toward his former protégé, Gareth Whitley, whose show promotes a kinder, more religious-based approach and encourages debate between liberal and conservative viewpoints. After Tess receives a job as an intern on her uncle's show and she criticizes his take on a "clean slate" bill to expunge liabilities for undocumented immigrants, Lionel has her rebut his points on-air. Lionel receives a call informing him that Laurie checked herself out of rehab with no knowledge of her whereabouts, resulting in Val revealing the deal Tess made with Laurie.

During a discussion with his producers about accepting an on-air showdown with Whitley, Tess convinces him to extend an invitation to Whitley to do the debate on the latter's show. During an argument when Tess discovers that her uncle has arranged to have her emancipated, Lionel reveals that he has never forgiven Laurie for abandoning him and stealing money he saved during his sophomore year of high school to live with Laurie and her boyfriend at the time to escape their troubled mother. He also tells a disappointed Tess that Laurie has left rehab.

During his appearance on Whitley's television program, Whitley invites liberal senator Judith Montefiore-Salters to discuss her immigration plan, only for Whitley to confront Lionel about his past and how it negatively shaped him. Lionel rounds on the studio audience and blames them for fissures in common decency through worshipping false prophets, arguing "the American Dream is dead and buried, and you're dancing on its grave." After the show, Tess criticizes Grayson, a fellow intern on Lionel's program with whom she developed a friendship, for revealing details about her family she told in confidence for Whitley to use against Lionel.

Lionel's assistant, Tyler, locates Laurie and reunites her with Tess, who expresses to her mother her worries about whether Laurie will commit to getting her life together. Val castigates Lionel about his on-air and off-air behavior, and breaks up with him. Lionel skips out on his first broadcast since the incident on Whitley's show, leaving producer Wendel—who has no on-air experience—to nervously fill in for him last-minute, to talk to Laurie about her daughter holding back her life for her mother and asks Laurie to stop running from her problems so Tess will stop holding herself back to tend to them. On his show, as Tess is listening after moving into her dorm at Harper, Lionel apologizes for his tirade and encourages his audience to respectfully disagree on personal views and have the courage to confront their past. Tess opens a box gifted by Lionel with pictures of her and Laurie that he had kept, and decides to call her uncle.

== Cast ==
- Steve Coogan as Lionel Macomb
- Taylor Russell as Tess Macomb
- Neve Campbell as Val Gannon
- Griffin Newman as Tyler Stafford
- Pico Alexander as Grayson
- Tina Benko as Laurie Macomb
- Lawrence Gilliard Jr. as Earl
- Judith Light as Judith Montefiore-Salters
- Skylar Astin as Gareth Whitley
- John Rothman as Kent
- Geoffrey Cantor as Stanley
- Jin Ha as Wendel
- Declan Michael Laird as Gennady
- Judah Friedlander as Man on the Street

== Reception ==
On Rotten Tomatoes, the film has an approval rating of 17% based on 18 reviews, and an average rating of 4.8/10. On Metacritic, the film has a weighted average score of 32 out of 100, based on 4 critics, indicating "generally unfavorable reviews".

In The New York Times, Bilge Ebiri wrote, "The movie seems afraid to follow through on any one emotional through line, and instead throws a whole bunch together. The script, by Will Reichel, jumps between Tess and Lionel’s challenges without ever entirely convincing us that their fates are connected. We feel like we’re watching two very different movies, neither of which is particularly engaging."
