= Vocalosity =

American a cappella group

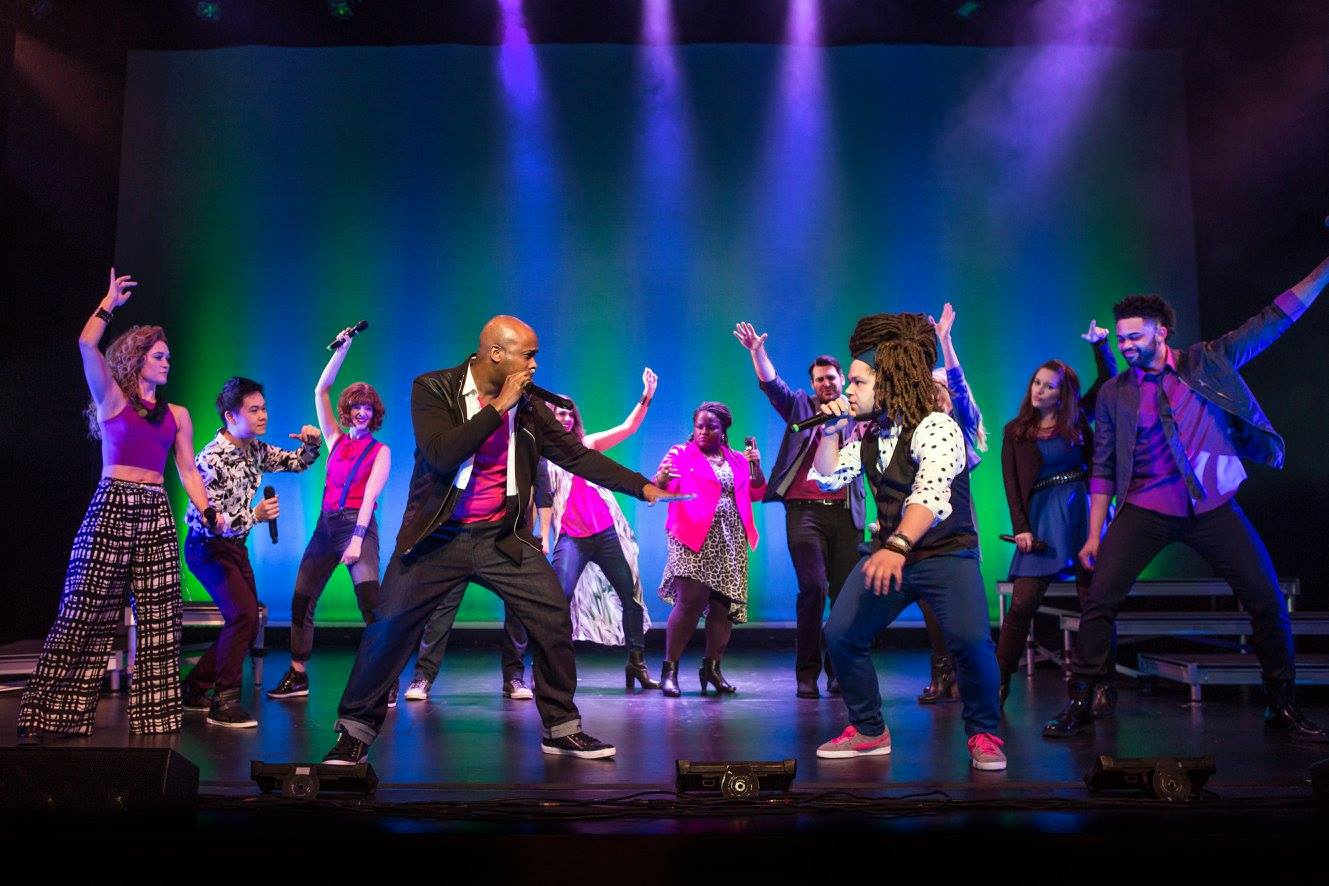
- Original Cast of Vocalosity, January 2016

Background information
- Origin: New York, New York
- Genres: A cappella, various styles
- Years active: 2015–2017
- Past members: Kelli Koloszar - S1; Amy Whitcomb - S2; Nicole Weiss - M Nattalyee Randall - A1; Hannah Juliano - A2; Cheeyang Ng - T1; RJ Woessner - T2; James C. Jones - B1; Bryant Vance - B2; Tracy L.J. Robertson - VP; Gerianne Perez; Chesney Snow

Vocalosity was a music group with ten members selected from televised singing shows like The Sing-Off, The Voice, national performing tours, a cappella groups and Broadway. Throughout the show, the group performs both as one large group and also in smaller configurations. Their repertoire spans from gregorian chant to current pop hits including The Beatles, Motown and Jazz. Artistic director, music director and arranger Deke Sharon, known for his work on Pitch Perfect and The Sing-Off, created the show with IMG Artists and Work Light Productions. Director and choreographer Seán Curran is the chair of the dance department at New York University and was an original cast member of the New York company of Stomp. Creative consultants Robert Sternin and Prudence Fraser are best known for their work developing The Nanny and writing for shows like Who's the Boss?.

Most performances featured a local opening act, chosen by public vote or by Deke Sharon, including high school and college groups, barbershop quartets, pop choirs and the like.

Members Gerianne Pérez and Chesney Snow left the group to join the Broadway Musical In Transit which opened December 11, 2016, so the group's second tour featured 10 members instead of 12.

== Album ==
Vocalosity's eponymous debut album was released on January 15, 2016, on Universal Classics (part of Decca Label Group ), and rose onto the iTunes Vocal charts in the United States (#27) and Japan (#30)

Vocalosity
| No. | Title | Writer(s) | Length |
|---|---|---|---|
| 1. | "Wanna Be Startin' Somethin'" | Michael Jackson | 3:02 |
| 2. | "Tightrope" | Janelle Monáe | 3:20 |
| 3. | "Locked Out of Heaven" | Bruno Mars | 3:29 |
| 4. | "Thinking Out Loud" | Ed Sheeran | 3:47 |
| 5. | "Hallelujah" | Leonard Cohen | 3:29 |
| 6. | "Whole Lotta Love" | Led Zeppelin | 4:36 |
| 7. | "Beatbox Break" | Chesney Snow, Tracy Robertson | 1:58 |
| 8. | "Sing Sing Sing" | Louis Prima | 2:19 |
| 9. | "True Colors" | Cyndi Lauper | 2:30 |
| 10. | "Shut Up And Dance" | Walk the Moon | 3:10 |
| 11. | "See You Again" | Wiz Khalifa | 4:17 |
| 12. | "Fever" | Little Willie John | 2:46 |
| 13. | "Fix You" | Coldplay | 2:56 |

== Concert tour ==
The group's first 33-city concert tour spanned January–March 2016. Their second 49-concert international tour was October 2016 through February 2017.
