= Camp Abercorn =

- Genre: Drama, LGBT
- Written by: Jeffrey Simon; Matthew Andrews; Meg Grgurich
- Directed by: Jeffrey Simon
- Starring: Brad Leland; Declan Michael Laird; Tyler Cook; Morgan West
- Country of origin: United States
- Original language: English
- No. of seasons: 1
- No. of episodes: 7

Production
- Executive producers: Jeffrey Simon; Matthew Andrews
- Running time: 30 minutes
- Production company: Gray Oak Productions

Original release
- Release: September 4, 2014

Camp Abercorn is an American web series originally slated to release in September 2014 that focuses on being a member of the Boy Scouts of America and also being gay. Using the fictional scouting organization called the Compass Guides of America, Camp Abercorn brings attention to the BSA's position on homosexuality and "the real situations young men face while away from home for an entire summer."

The show is working with a $100,000 budget, which it met through crowdfunding on Indiegogo. George Takei endorsed the series and the Indiegogo campaign in early August, 2014, posting that people should fund it. The post on Facebook stated, "This is an excellent new Web series in the final hours of its crowd funding campaign. The filmmaker - a gay Eagle Scout - shines light on the Boy Scouts of America, both what it stands for, and the controversies it still faces."

== Synopsis ==
=== Setting and overview ===
The series is set in the Rocky Mountains at a summer camp mirroring a BSA-structured camp. GLAAD describes Camp Abercorn as "A new fictional dramatic web series... follow[ing] the staff [who] develop as leaders, or Compass Guides, while learning and growing away from the pressures of school and work." The camp is typical of scouting camps that generally deal with social interactions that are almost exclusively between males.

=== Characters ===
Colin: Colin hails from London and is a direct descendant of one of the Compass Guides founders. He wants nothing to do with the camp.

Mark: Mark is Camp Abercorn's new director.

Russell: Russell is a "archetypical life-time scout" who is the shooting sports director at Camp Abercorn.

Zak: Zak is Russell's protege, and also happens to be gay.

=== Plot ===
A British teenager angry with the world, a closeted Eagle Guide, and a Shooting Sports Director with a thirst for power, are part of the staff that collide at Compass Guide Camp. A mysterious new Camp Director with a militant past (and pet chicken) finds he's not sure where he's going, but he's leading the way.

== Cast ==
Zak: Morgan West
Russell: Brad Leland
Colin: Declan Michael Laird
Mark: Tyler Cook
Willy: Zach Louis
Sage: Jeff Rosick

== Soundtrack ==
Chris Ayer - Carry
Chris Ayer - The Infinite Abyss of Space
The Currys - Big Cold Mountain

== Impact ==
Jeffrey Simon, executive producer of the series, hopes to "re-direct the conversation away from executives in fancy offices and bring it back to the values of scouts and importance of camp". He continues with "I am in awe of what activist organizations like Scouts for Equality and their LGBT allies have done and are still doing to bring change to the BSA. Boycotts and activism can go far to change policy, but no amount of lecturing can change people. What can change people are stories. What can change hearts and minds are stories." This series, acting as one of those stories, brings more attention to the BSA's policy of excluding gay men serving in leadership positions.

Simon continued, "I hope this series will help bring back some interest in the Boy Scouts. We need an organization to train our future leaders; leaders that believe in the power of equality. I hope I can one day join the troop and give back to the organization that gave me so much."
