= The Scottish Short Film Festival =

- Location: Scotland, United Kingdom
- Founded: 2012
- Founded by: Chris Young, Regina Vereker
- Language: English
- Website: www.scottishshortfilmfestival.co.uk

The Scottish Short Film Festival is an independent film festival which has taken place annually in Scotland from 2012. From 2012 to 2017, the festival was known as The Raptor Filmz Short Scottish Film Festival until the event was rebranded in 2018 to Scottish Short Film Festival.

== History and format ==
The festival was set up in 2012 by Scottish filmmaker Chris Young. The first festival took place in Glasgow at the Grosvenor Cinema and at later dates was held at Howden Park Centre in Livingston and Bathgate Regal Community Theatre.

The festival returned in 2018 with Scottish actor Regina Vereker coming onboard alongside to help run the film festival, and under the new name of The Scottish Short Film Festival. The Centre for Contemporary Arts in Glasgow was due to host the 2018 festival but due to the fire at the Glasgow School of Art, the venue was forced to close. It was announced on the festival's Twitter account that the Crowne Plaza Glasgow would take over as host.

In 2021, during the COVID pandemic, the film festival was moved online and returned to an in-person event at The Art School, Glasgow for 2022 (10th edition).

After a three year break, The Scottish Short Film Festival has relaunched with a new team of volunteers, and the 11th edition of the Scottish Short Film Festival will be held at Kelvin Hall, Glasgow in July 2026.

== Festival award winners ==
List of winners and nominees of the festival.

=== 2012 winners ===
| Award | Film | Recipient(s) |
|---|---|---|
| 1st Audience Prize | Mugging For Amateurs | Johnny Herbin |
| 2nd Audience Prize | The Lost Purse | Colin Ross Smith |
| 3rd Audience Prize (Tied) | Archie - A Wee Ghost Story; Rabbit Punch | Steven Patrick, Liz Baillie, Scott Watson; Neil Hartop |
| Best Director | The Lost Purse | Colin Ross Smith |
| Best Actor | The Lost Purse | Declan Michael Laird |
| Best Music | The Lost Purse | Francis Macdonald |
| Best Script | Rabbit Punch | Neil Hartop, Gregory Humphries |
| Best Set | Rabbit Punch | Neil Hartop |
| Best Costume/Make-up | Peanut | |

=== 2014 winners ===
| Award | Film | Recipient(s) |
|---|---|---|
| 1st Judges Prize | Sockzilla | Paul Bruce |
| 2nd Judges Prize | What Have You Done? | Susan Sutton, William Samson |
| Audience Choice | Just Say Hi | John McPhail |
| Best Director | Sockzilla | Paul Bruce |
| Best Music | Sockzilla | Paul Bruce |
| Most Original | Sockzilla | Paul Bruce |
| Best Actor | A Day Of | |
| Best Actress | What Have You Done? | Susan Sutton |
| Best Costume | Poppy | Kev Pickering |

=== 2015 winners ===
| Award | Film | Recipient(s) |
|---|---|---|
| 1st Judges Prize | Middle Man | Charlie Francis, Katie White |
| 2nd Judges Prize | Wake Up Call | Kev Pickering |
| Audience Choice | Middle Man | Charlie Francis, Katie White |
| Best Actress | Reflections | Kerry Browne |
| Best Actor | Middle Man | Joe Cassidy |
| Most Creative/Original | Middle Man | Charlie Francis, Katie White |
| Best Script | Godhammer | Paul Bruce |
| Best Costume | Godhammer | Paul Bruce |
| Best Music | Nancy | William Sampson |
| Best Set Design | Wake Up Call | Kev Pickering |
| Film Combo Prize | Graveyard | Slimbo Boye |

=== 2016 winners ===
| Award | Film | Recipient(s) |
|---|---|---|
| 1st Judges Prize | Safe Haven | Stuart Gilmartin |
| 2nd Judges Prize | Hole | Mike Callaghan |
| Big Audience Prize | Hole | Mike Callaghan |
| Little Audience Prize | Red Sky On The Black Isle | Lisa Marley |
| The Golden Raptor Award | Pandora | Drew Mewse |
| Best Director | Safe Haven | Stuart Gilmartin |
| Best Actor | Hole | James Cosmo |
| Best Actress | Best Man | Seylan Baxter |
| Most Creative/Original | Tracks | Kris Blair |
| Best Music | Tracks | Kris Blair |
| Best Script | The Bullies | Ahmad Dabiri |
| Best Costume | Broadfoot's Magical Adventure | Andy S. McEwan |

=== 2017 winners ===
- The Golden Raptor Award - Portrait of the Artwork as a Young Man - Chris Gerrard
- Judges 1st Prize - Writer's Block
- Judges 2nd Prize - Enora
- Audience Choice Award (Evening Session) - Dying To Forgive
- Audience Choice Award (Afternoon Session) - Weekend Away

| Award | Winner(s) | Nominees |
|---|---|---|
| Best Director | Vito Milazzo - Writer's Block | Stuart Gilmartin - Smile; Sami Khadraoui, Benoît Monney - Enora; Matt Hielsberg, Nicci Thompson - We Sit We Drink No Guns; Vito Milazzo - Writer's Block |
| Best Actor | Sean Biggerstaff - Enora | Richard Hughson - Ragnor; Sean Biggerstaff - Enora; Gary Lind - Dying To Forgive; Mark Wood - Writer's Block |
| Best Actress | Briony Monroe - Eggshells | Christine Clare - Fuel; Rachel Mcphail - Weekend Away; Nicolette McKeown - Smile; Briony Monroe - Eggshells |
| Best Script | Sami Khadraoui, Benoît Monney - Enora | Stephen Mercer - Ragnor; Sami Khadraoui, Benoît Monney - Enora; Vito Milazzo - Writer's Block |
| Best Music | Julien Painot - Enora | Eamonn Watt - The Old Croft; Vincent Breant - Ragnar; Owen Devlin - Splinter; Julien Painot - Enora; David Cicero - Writer's Block |
| Best Sound | Logan Byers, Bradly Clark - We Sit We Drink No Guns | Björn Cornelius, Laurent Vonlanthen - Enora; Logan Byers, Bradly Clark - We Sit We Drink No Guns; Sean Gill - Writer's Block |
| Best Costume/Make up | Juliette Sedlacek - We Sit We Drink No Guns | Léonard Berney - Enora; Juliette Sedlacek - We Sit We Drink No Guns |
| Most Creative/Original | The Old Croft | The Old Croft; Portrait of the Artwork as a Young Man; Splinter; Enora |

=== 2018 winners ===
- The Golden Raptor Award - Carved - Daniel Caradec
- Judges 1st Prize - Lethe - Eric Romero
- Judges 2nd Prize - To The Sea - Mark Westbrook & R. Paul Wilson
- Audience Choice Award - Drone - Robert Duncan
- Rising Star Award - To The Sea - Gregor Selkirk
- Golden Bawhair - The She Wolves Of Wall Street - Tamsin Amantea-Collins

| Award | Winner(s) | Nominees |
|---|---|---|
| Best Director | Kevin Pickering - Close To The Bone | R. Paul Wilson - To The Sea; Eric Romero - Lethe; Kevin Pickering - Close To The Bone |
| Best Actor | David Scott - Close To The Bone | Alec Westwood - Butterfly; Paul Comrie - To The Sea; David Scott - Close To The Bone |
| Best Actress | Kirsty Findlay - Lethe | Kirsty Findlay - Lethe; Megan Thomas - Practice; Michelle Donnelly - A Calm Sea Sways |
| Best Script | Farewells | Lethe; Farewells; The Pitch; Clementine |
| Best Cinematography | Close To The Bone | To The Sea; Escape; Close To The Bone |
| Best Editing | Close To The Bone | Life of a Ten Pound Note; Close To The Bone; Teeth |
| Best Documentary | Teeth | Inhale; A Thin Place; Teeth; We Are Here |
| Best Sound/Music | Close To The Bone | Butterfly; Playback; Close To The Bone |
| Best Costume/Make up | Escape | Lethe; Mia : A Rapture 2.0 Production; Wolves in Winter; Escape |
| Most Creative/Original | Life Of A Ten Pound Note | Life Of A Ten Pound Note; Lose Like A Human; Farewells; Carved |

=== 2019 winners ===
- The Golden Raptor Award - Remember Me - Katie Low
- Judges 1st Prize - Turning Tide - Andrew Muir
- Judges 2nd Prize - Spaceship - Conor McMahon
- Judges 3rd Prize - Mess - Graham Robertson
- Main Event Audience Choice Award - Spaceship - Conor McMahon
- Matinee Audience Award - Turning The Tables - Jay Rowan Tanner
- Golden Raptor Award - Remember Me - Katie Low

| Award | Winner(s) | Nominees |
|---|---|---|
| Best Director | Andrew Muir - Turning Tide | Andrew Muir - Turning Tide; Paul Diffley - Free Flow; Alex Cormack - Lost Brothers; Charlotte Daniel - Carmen |
| Best Lead Actor | Malcolm Cumming - Spaceship | Alec Westwood - Remember Me; Malcolm Cumming - Spaceship; Graham Robertson - Mess; Ronan Doyle - Lost Brothers |
| Best Lead Actress | Kate Donnelly - Regrets | Jenny Clifford - Hearts; Sharnee Tones - Emma; Diane Brooks - Crackpot; Kate Donnelly - Regrets |
| Best Script | Lost Brothers | Carmen; Lost Brothers; Remember Me; Revenant Relocation Officers |
| Best Cinematography | Turning Tide | Mountain; Free Flow; Turning Tide; Emma |
| Best Editing | Close To The Bone | Life of a Ten Pound Note; Close To The Bone; Teeth |
| Best Documentary | Where Eagles Dare | A Little Revival; Where Eagles Dare; We See The World Differently |
| Thomas Haywood Award for Best Use Of Scottish Landscape | Where Eagles Dare | Free Flow; Where Eagles Dare |
| Acting Coach Scotland Rising Star Award | Ronan Doyle - Escape | Patrick McLaughlan - Turning Tide; Graham Robertson - Mess; Ronan Doyle - Lost Brothers |

=== 2020 Winners ===
- Audience Choice Award - Eyes Down

| Award | Winner(s) | Nominees |
|---|---|---|
| Best Film | Ghillie | She of the Land; Ghillie; The Last Mermaid; Eyes Down |
| Best Director | Mike Marriage - Ghillie | Barnum Smith - Mug Shot; Neil Boyle - The Coffin Walk; Fi Kelly - The Last Mermaid; Mike Marriage - Ghillie |
| Best Lead Actor | Stephen Chase - Ghillie | John McQuiston - The Coffin Walk; James Joseph Robson - She of the Land; Calum Verrecchia - Mug Shot; Stephen Chase - Ghillie |
| Best Lead Actress | Janey Godley - The Last Mermaid | Rowan Birkett - Cold; Sophie Anne Scarfe - Eyes Down; Janey Godley - The Last Mermaid; Deirdre Murray - Ghillie |
| Best Script | Autumn Never Dies | The Last Mermaid; Autumn Never Dies; Ghillie; Mug Shot |
| Best Cinematography | Ghillie | She of the Land; Ghillie; Highland Home; The Ghost of Me and You |
| Best Editing | Ghillie | Ghillie; The Ghost of Me and You; Attention Please; The A.W.O.L |
| Best Documentary | Dolce Caledonia | Dolce Caledonia; Grime Scene Scotland |
| Most Creative / Original | Eyes Down | Eyes Down; The Last Mermaid; Ghillie; Devil's Horn |
| Best Music | Devil Horns | Living with Musicians; Eyes Down; Devil Horns; Ghillie |
| Best Sound | Ghillie | Red Laces Are For Punks; Highland Home; Ghillie; Eyes Down |
| Best Costume/Make Up | She of the Land | Mug Shot; Highland Home; She of the Land; The Last Mermaid |

=== 2021 Winners ===
- Audience Choice Award - Last House on CCTV

| Award | Winner(s) | Nominees |
|---|---|---|
| Best Film | Trifle | A Grand Artist; Neeps and Tatties; Trifle; Yellowbird |
| Best Director | Lucy Chappell - Yellowbird | Craig Andrew Robertson - Last House in CCTV; Karen Kelly - Chips; Lucy Chappell - Yellowbird; Mike Callaghan - Trifle |
| Best Actor | Ronnie Brodie - Old Friends | Ian Pirie - Yellowbird; Jeremy Theobald - Custodian; Liam Muir - The Grey Man; Ronnie Brodie - Old Friends |
| Best Actress | Amy Mason - Trifle | Seylan Baxter - Left Behind; Lucy Chappell - Yellowbird; Amy Mason - Trifle; Hayley-May Muirhead - Helianthus |
| Acting Coach Scotland Rising Star Award | Sophie Lawson - Chips | Hayley-May Muirhead - Helianthus; Nicola Docherty - Authentic; Ronnie Brodie - Old Friends; Sophie Lawson - Chips |
| Best Script | Chips | Chips; Helianthus; Old Friends; Trifle |
| Best Cinematography | Chips | Chips; Custodian; Hell's Kitchen; Slainte (Good Health) |
| Best Editing | The World's Strongest Unicyclist | Chips; Last House on CCTV; Neeps and Tatties; The World's Strongest Unicyclist |
| Best Documentary | Mr. Lune Town | A Grand Artist; Mr. Lune Town; My Dad's Video Diary; The World's Strongest Unicyclist |
| Most Creative / Original | Neeps and Tatties | Custodian; Damned; Left; Neeps and Tatties |
| Best Music | Authentic | Authentic; Custodian; Helianthus; The World's Strongest Unicyclist |
| Best Sound | Custodian | Custodian; Last House on CCTV; Mr. Lune Town; The Treasurer |
| Best Costume/Make Up | Hell's Kitchen | Custodian; Damned; Hell's Kitchen; The Treasurer |
| Thomas Haywood Aerial Photography Award | After Ice | After Ice; The Grey Man |

=== 2022 Winners ===
- Audience Choice Award (Saturday Screening) - 1815 - Neil Boyle
- Audience Choice Award (Sunday Screening) - Terminal Happiness - Eric Romero
- Judges 1st Prize - 1815 - Neil Boyle
- Judges 2nd Prize - Whale Heart - Phillip Edge
- Golden Raptor Award - Professor Heny Bowfax's Fantastic Journey Through Time!

| Award | Winner(s) | Nominees |
|---|---|---|
| Best Director | Terminal Happiness - Eric Romero | 1815 - Neil Boyle; A Tale of Tragedy - Tim Lyonds; Terminal Happiness - Eric Romero; Snapshot - Steve Johnson |
| Best Actor | 1815 - Iain MaCrae | 1815 - Iain MaCrae; 1815 - Stephen Kerr; Worlds Apart - Jatinder Singh Randhawa; Whale Heart - Liam J. Barr |
| Best Actress | Snapshot - Kirsty Strain | Romance Is Dead? - Ainsley Jordan; Snapshot - Carrie Dodds; Snapshot - Kirsty Strain; Terminal Happiness - Rachel Flynn |
| Acting Coach Scotland Rising Star Award | 1815 - Kayla Caldwell | No Formal Nominations |
| Best Script | 1815 - Neil Boyle | Terminal Happiness - Chinh Van Tran; 1815 - Neil Boyle; Fort Tom - Arthur Johnson; Shooting Animals - Libby Penman |
| Best Cinematography | 1815 - Kasparas Vidunas | 1815 - Kasparas Vidunas; A Tale of Tragedy - James Taylor; Neolith - Garry Ferrier, Ross Ferrier; The Removal - Klaudia Borbely |
| Best Editing | Neolith - Garry Ferrier, Ross Ferrier | A Tale of Tragedy - Joshua Strang; Neolith - Garry Ferrier, Ross Ferrier; Shooting Animals - Libby Penman; Whale Heart - Phillip Edge |
| Best Documentary | Shooting Animals - Libby Penman | Kafia; One Last Spin; Shooting Animals; Call of The Cliff; Moment of Impact |
| Most Creative / Original | Whale Heart - Phillip Edge | Removal; 1815; Wahle Heart; Dive |
| Best Music | Terminal Happiness - Margaryta Kulichova | Terminal Happiness - Margaryta Kulichova; Wild Haggis - Benjamin Woodbridge; The Removal - Jamie Clapton; Shooting Animals - Libby Penman |
| Best Sound | 1815 - Scott Walker | Singulars - Luis Del Pozo; 1815 - Scott Walker; Call of the Cliff - Luke Stainiland; Snapshot - Scott Walker, Ewan Jessamine |
| Best Costume/Make Up | Termiinal Happiness - Kerttu Reinmaa, Eliise Sepp | A Tale of Tragedy - Alma Conway, Katrina Doran; 1815 - Samantha Jack, Urte Rusteikaite, Ellen Bramwell; Neolith - Olaya Valiente, Heather Currie; Terminal Happiness - Kerttu Reinmaa, Eliise Sepp |
| Best Animation | Love Letter to Glasgow - Myria Chrystophini | Love Letter to Glasgow; Eyes Open |
| Thomas Haywood Best Use of Scottish Landscape Award | The Longest Line | Call of the Cliff; Scotland's Wild Industry; 1815; The Longest Line |
