= Dana Gaier =

American actress

Dana Gaier is an American actress who voices Edith in the Despicable Me franchise.

== Early life and career ==
Gaier was raised in Livingston, New Jersey. She got into acting after accompanying her older sister to an audition after her mother could not find a babysitter and brought her along. Gaier moved to Burbank, California around 2013 and has been a student at the University of California, Los Angeles.

== Personal life ==
Gaier married Adam Ellis on August 17, 2024.

== Filmography ==
- Despicable Me (2010) – Edith (voice)
- Despicable Me Minion Mayhem (2012) – Edith (voice)
- Despicable Me 2 (2013) – Edith (voice)
- Despicable Me 3 (2017) – Edith (voice)
- The Ice Cream Truck (2017) – Brie
- Ernesto's Manifesto (2019)
- Despicable Me 4 (2024) – Edith (voice)
