= Under Fire (2025 film) =

2025 American action comedy film

- Theatrical release poster
- Directed by: Steven C. Miller
- Written by: Adrian Speckert; Cory Todd Hughes
- Produced by: Lucas Jarach
- Starring: Dylan Sprouse; Mason Gooding; Odette Annable; Emilio Rivera; Declan Michael Laird
- Cinematography: Jonathan Hall
- Edited by: Steven C. Miller; Vanessa Miller
- Music by: Kevin Riepl
- Production company: Voltage Pictures
- Distributed by: Vertical
- Release date: August 15, 2025
- Running time: 91 minutes
- Country: United States
- Language: English

Under Fire is a 2025 American action comedy film directed by Steven C. Miller, written by Adrian Speckert and Cory Todd Hughes, and produced by Voltage Pictures. The film stars Dylan Sprouse and Mason Gooding as a DEA agent and a FBI agent, respectively, who unwittingly discover they are working the same drug-cartel investigation, only to be pinned down together behind enemy lines by a sniper. This is the second time Sprouse and Gooding have acted together in an action film, having been previously starred in Aftermath (2024).

== Premise ==
Two undercover agents—an FBI agent (Sprouse) and a DEA agent (Gooding)—separately infiltrate a Mexican drug cartel. When they mutually reveal their identities at a remote border meet-up, they become trapped in a sniper-led ambush. Realizing they’ve been working parallel sides, they must overcome their distrust to survive.

== Cast ==
- Dylan Sprouse as FBI Agent Griff
- Mason Gooding as DEA Agent Abbott
- Odette Annable as Agent Vasquez
- Emilio Rivera as Valentino
- Declan Michael Laird as Spotter
- Bayardo De Murguia as Delgado

== Production ==
Voltage Pictures acquired worldwide rights ahead of the American Film Market in October 2024. Principal photography took place in California under director Steven C. Miller, known for previous action films including Line of Duty and Werewolves.

== Release ==
Under Fire was released in the United States on August 15, 2025, both in limited theaters and via video on demand platforms.
