= Charlie Francis (director) =

Scottish film director

- Born: Glasgow, Scotland
- Occupation: Film director
- Years active: 2009–present

Charlie Francis is a Scottish film director who is possibly best known for his directorial work on the short film Middle Man The film was awarded Best British Short at the Iris Film Festival which included a sponsored prize from Pinewood Studios. On 19 March 2015, it was announced by BAFTA Scotland that the film was nominated for the Best Entertainment accolade at the 2015 British Academy Scotland New Talent Awards.

== Filmography ==
Year	Film	Credited as			Notes
Year	Film	Director	Editor	Producer	Notes
2009	Champagne, Christmas and L.O.L.	Yes	Yes		Short Film
2011	Together in Electric Dreams	Yes			Short Film
2011	Box Squared	Yes	Yes	Yes	Short Film
2012	Cloud Nine	Yes	Yes		Short Film
2014	Middle Man	Yes	Yes	Yes	Short Film
2016	When a Man Loves a Woman	Yes			Short Film

== Awards ==
Year	Nominated Work	Awards	Category	Result
2014	Middle Man	Iris Prize Festival	Best British Short (Shared with Katie White)	Won
2015	Middle Man	British Academy Scotland New Talent Awards	Best Entertainment (Shared with Katie White)	Nominated
2015	Middle Man	The Scottish Short Film Festival	Judges 1st Prize (Shared with Katie White)	Won
2015	Middle Man	The Scottish Short Film Festival	Best Original Film (Shared with Katie White)	Won
