= Despicable Me 2 =

2013 Illumination film

- Theatrical release poster
- Directed by: Chris Renaud; Pierre Coffin
- Written by: Cinco Paul; Ken Daurio
- Produced by: Chris Meledandri; Janet Healy
- Starring: Steve Carell; Kristen Wiig; Benjamin Bratt; Russell Brand; Miranda Cosgrove; Steve Coogan; Ken Jeong
- Edited by: Gregory Perler
- Music by: Heitor Pereira
- Production companies: Universal Pictures; Illumination Entertainment
- Distributed by: Universal Pictures
- Release dates: June 5, 2013 (Australia); July 3, 2013 (United States)
- Running time: 97 minutes
- Country: United States
- Language: English
- Budget: $76 million
- Box office: $971 million

Despicable Me 2 is a 2013 American animated comedy film directed by Chris Renaud and Pierre Coffin, and written by Cinco Paul and Ken Daurio. Produced by Universal Pictures and Illumination Entertainment, it is the second installment in the Despicable Me franchise following the 2010 film. The film stars the voices of Steve Carell, Kristen Wiig, Benjamin Bratt, Russell Brand, Miranda Cosgrove, Steve Coogan, and Ken Jeong. In the film, secret agent Lucy Wilde (Wiig) recruits retired supervillain Gru to investigate the theft of a powerful mutagen by an unknown criminal suspected by the latter to be El Macho (Bratt), a villain who is believed to have died decades prior.

Development of Despicable Me 2 began in 2010 following the success of the original film, with the directors, producers, and writers returning. Production was underway by February 2012, with the majority of the cast returning to voice the characters, along with new cast members, while animation services were provided by Illumination Mac Guff in France. Al Pacino was cast as the voice of El Macho, recording all of his dialogue, but left in May 2013 over creative differences; Bratt was brought in to replace Pacino, and used him as an inspiration after finding imitating his voice impossible. Heitor Pereira and Pharrell Williams returned for the sequel's music.

Despicable Me 2 premiered in Australia on June 5, 2013, and was theatrically released in the United States on July 3 by Universal Pictures. It received generally positive reviews from critics, who praised its humor and animation. It earned $971 million worldwide, becoming the third-highest-grossing film of 2013 and the most profitable film for Universal at the time. It was nominated for two awards at the 86th Academy Awards, and received numerous other accolades. A sequel, Despicable Me 3, was released in 2017.

== Plot ==
A mysterious aircraft steals a highly potent mutagen known as PX-41 from a laboratory at Alert, Nunavut in the Arctic Circle. Silas Ramsbottom, director of the Anti-Villain League (AVL), sends agent Lucy Wilde to recruit former supervillain Gru. Gru refuses and informs Silas and Lucy that he has enough responsibilities as a father and as the owner of a jelly-producing business. Later, Gru's assistant Dr. Nefario is forced to retire and accept a job offer to assist another villain, which convinces Gru to work with the AVL after all. He and Lucy are stationed at a shopping center, with a cupcake store as their front.

Gru suspects that Mexican restaurant owner Eduardo Pérez might be El Macho, a powerful supervillain who was presumed dead twenty years ago after riding a shark into an active volcano with 250 pounds of dynamite strapped to his chest. Gru and Lucy sneak into Eduardo's restaurant, Salsa & Salsa, but come up empty-handed, finding no proof of his villainous ways. Meanwhile, Gru's adopted daughter Agnes, who longs for a mother, is convinced that Gru will fall for Lucy—a notion he firmly denies.

Although Eduardo remains his main suspect, Gru decides to follow up on other leads, one of which takes him to the wig shop owned by Floyd Eaglesan, where Lucy finds traces of the mutagen. After witnessing Eduardo's son Antonio woo Margo, Gru renews his focus on Eduardo, who in turn invites the family to his Cinco de Mayo party. Later that day, Gru's neighbor Jillian sets him up on a blind date with her friend Shannon. The date goes awry, but Lucy saves Gru from embarrassment by tranquilizing Shannon. The two subsequently begin to bond. The following day, the AVL arrests Floyd after discovering a nearly empty jar of mutagen in his shop. Despite his protests that he's been framed, Ramsbottom closes the investigation and reassigns Lucy to Australia, leaving Gru heartbroken.

At Eduardo's party, Gru follows Eduardo and discovers that he is indeed El Macho. Having faked his death and with Nefario as his assistant, El Macho has kidnapped most of Gru's Minions and used the mutagen to transform them into purple, mindless, indestructible monsters, intent on using them to conquer the world. El Macho offers Gru the chance to team up with him, but Gru becomes terrified and, believing that his plan to spy on El Macho worked, leaves with his daughters, including Margo, who was recently dumped by Antonio. Suspicious, El Macho sends Kevin, one of the mutated Minions, after them.

Lucy, choosing to ignore orders, heads home and arrives at the party just after Gru leaves. When El Macho learns that she and Gru work for the AVL, he takes her hostage. Nefario sees this and alerts Gru, who sneaks into El Macho's fortress with two disguised Minions, only to be attacked by mutated Minions. Meanwhile, Kevin breaks into Gru's house to go after Margo and Agnes, but they trap him in the lab. Nefario returns with an antidote to cure Kevin's mutation, mixes it into Gru's jelly, and, along with the girls and remaining Minions, rushes to help Gru and cure the others. El Macho threatens to send Lucy into the volcano where he once faked his death, using mutagen to fight Gru. Gru defeats him with one of Lucy's gadgets, and Nefario finishes him off with the fart gun.

Gru tries to rescue Lucy from the rocket she is tied to while asking her out on a date, but El Macho's pet hen, Pollito, launches it. Before it reaches the volcano, Lucy accepts Gru's request, and they leap into the ocean to escape. Months later, after 147 dates, they marry, and Lucy becomes the girls' adoptive mother.

== Voice cast ==
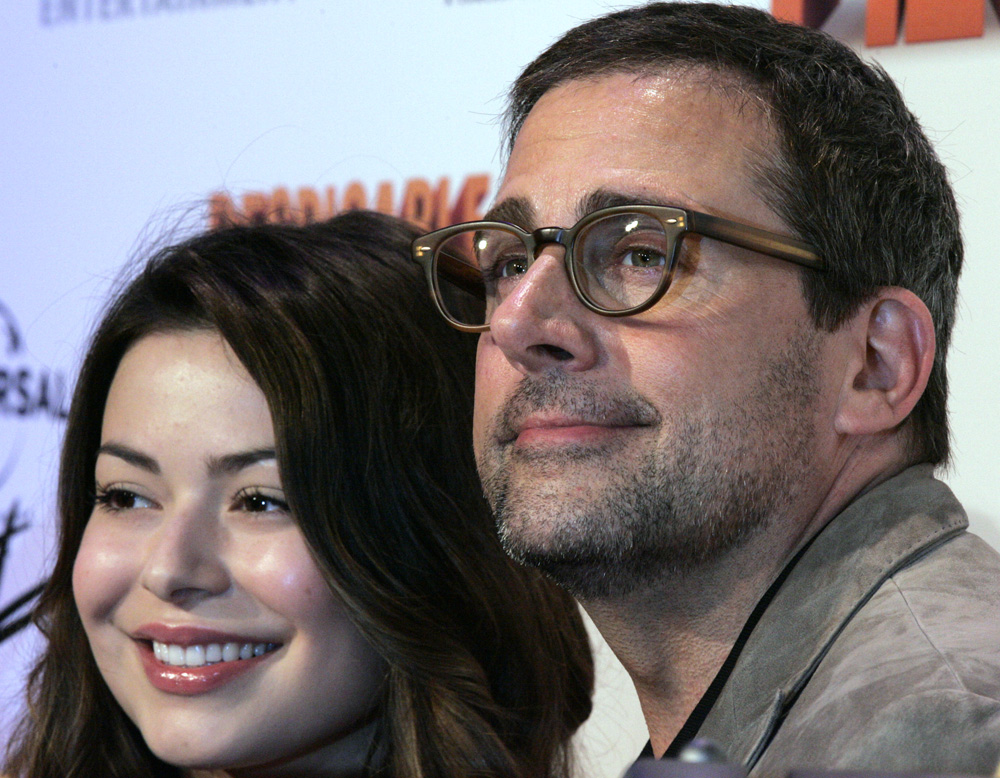
Miranda Cosgrove and Steve Carell at the Australian premiere of Despicable Me 2

- Steve Carell as Gru, a former supervillain-turned-father and later a member of the Anti-Villain League (AVL)
- Kristen Wiig as Lucy Wilde, an AVL agent and Gru's love interest
- Benjamin Bratt as Eduardo Pérez / El Macho, the owner of Salsa & Salsa – a Mexican restaurant at Paradise Mall – and the perpetrator of the PX-41 mutagen's theft. (Note: Al Pacino was originally to cast El Macho, but left due to creative differences)
- Russell Brand as Dr. Nefario, Gru's elderly gadget man and sidekick
- Miranda Cosgrove as Margo, the eldest of Gru and Lucy's three adopted daughters
- Dana Gaier as Edith, the middle of the three girls
- Elsie Fisher as Agnes, the youngest of the three girls
- Steve Coogan as Silas Ramsbottom, the director of the AVL
- Pierre Coffin as the Minions. According to Coffin, he lent his voice to 899 of them
- Ken Jeong as Floyd Eaglesan, the owner of Eagle Hair Club, a wig store at Paradise Mall
- Nasim Pedrad as Jillian, Gru's irritating matchmaking neighbor who wants him to date her friends
- Kristen Schaal as Shannon, Jillian's superficial friend
- Moisés Arias as Antonio Pérez, El Macho's son and Margo's love interest

Other cast members include Chris Renaud as additional Minions and an Italian waiter, Vanessa Bayer as a flight attendant, Nickolai Stoilov as the Arctic lab guards, and Young Jeezy as a rapper who raps during the submarine scene as well as the Cinco de Mayo party scene that took place at the restaurant owned by El Macho.

== Production ==
=== Development ===
Development of Despicable Me 2 began following the unexpected financial success of Despicable Me (2010). In June 2011, Universal announced that the sequel would be released on July 3, 2013. Chris Meledandri, CEO of Illumination Entertainment, confirmed in February 2012 that they had started working on the film. An idea featuring the Minions with superpowers was cut, so the filmmakers decided to use the evil versions of them instead; it was later used in Despicable Me 4 (2024).

=== Casting ===
In October 2011, The Hollywood Reporter reported that Javier Bardem was negotiating to voice a villain, named El Macho, but the negotiations failed and chose to play the villain in Skyfall instead. By February 2012, Al Pacino had joined the cast to voice the film's main antagonist, which would've made his first act in an animated film. In April 2012, producers confirmed that Steve Carell, Russell Brand, Miranda Cosgrove, Dana Gaier and Elsie Fisher were returning to reprise their roles. Kristen Wiig, who voiced Miss Hattie in the first film, voices Lucy Wilde, an agent of the Anti-Villain League who recruits Gru to track and take down a tough, Mexican villain named El Macho. Steve Coogan joined the cast as Silas Ramsbottom, the head of the Anti-Villain League.

In May 2013, producers announced that Pacino had left the film over creative differences about how his character should come to life. At the time of his departure, Pacino's character had already been fully voiced and animated. Chris Renaud, co-director of the film, commented on Pacino's departure: "So we don't want an unhappy actor, and we want something that is well realized on all sides. If you don't see eye to eye, sometimes it's easier to (part company) and move on from there." Benjamin Bratt, who had already been considered before Pacino, stepped in to voice Eduardo. Chris Meledandri, producer of the film, stated that he was not "aware of any of the major animated films of the last 15 years that has brought an actor in at such a late stage". Due to the finished animation, Bratt had to match his timing exactly to the character's mouth movement. Initially, during his five-day recording, he tried to imitate Pacino's voice, but found it impossible, saying "no one can out-Al Pacino Al Pacino". He ended up only using Pacino as an inspiration, and resolved to go with his own interpretation of the character. His work was commended by Variety, saying: "You'd never guess he wasn't the filmmakers' first choice."

=== Animation ===
The animation was handled by Illumination Mac Guff in Paris using Autodesk Maya, over 400 artists worked on the sequel, in contrast to the team of 100 artists the first film required. One of the biggest challenges for the animation team was creating visual effects (such as water and jelly), which led to the crashing and replacement of some of the studio's drives.

== Music ==
Following the success of the predecessor's music, the composers, Heitor Pereira and Pharrell Williams collaborated again for the music of Despicable Me 2. The soundtrack to the film, titled Despicable Me 2: Original Motion Picture Soundtrack was released on July 2, 2013, through Back Lot Music. The album featured eight songs and 16 score tracks, combining for 24 tracks in the album. The songs consisted of three original and five incorporated tracks, and two of the songs were already featured in its predecessor.

Williams' original song "Happy" was the only single from the album, released five months after the film's release, on November 21, 2013. It was accompanied by a 24-hour music video upon release, a first for any film, which received a viral response, contributing to the song's global success. It topped the charts in over 19 countries, became the best-selling song in United Kingdom and United States, with over 1.5 and 6.45 million copies sold in 2014, and was nominated for Best Original Song at the 86th Academy Awards.

The soundtrack additionally debuted at US Billboard 200 in number 86, while also featured at the Independent Albums (number 19) and Top Soundtracks (top-three) charts. It also listed in Official Charts Company's Compilation Chart (number 48) and Soundtracks Chart (number 8). A single "Just a Cloud Away" released on March 25, 2022, eight years after the film and soundtrack release.

== Marketing and release ==
In March 2013, a blimp dressed to appear as a Minion, named "Despicablimp", in which Universal and Van Wagner Communications owns an American Blimp Corporation A-150 model, traveled through the United States for a 20,000-mile-long (32,000 km) tour to promote the film's release. As one of the largest airships in the world, it measured 165 feet (50 m) in length, 55 feet (17 m) in height, and weighed 8,000 pounds (3.6 t). Universal Pictures partnered the film with licensing and promotional partners valued at an unprecedented $200–$250 million in the next three years. One of the partners was McDonald's, which included in its Happy Meals various Minion toys, some of them unique to a specific country. To take advantage of banana-loving Minions, Chiquita ran various sweepstakes, and a Minion, voiced by Pierre Coffin, performed the song "Chiquita Banana" in the film. Thinkway Toys released various toys and figures, and Hasbro made special games. The campaign featured 600 toy brands. As a promotional tie-in, Despicable Me: Minion Rush was released.

Despicable Me 2 debuted on June 5, 2013, at Event Cinemas in Bondi Junction, Sydney, Australia, followed by a premiere on June 12, at the Annecy International Animated Film Festival. In the United States, the film's premiere took place on June 22, at the Universal CityWalk in Los Angeles, and was released in theaters on July 3. It was digitally re-mastered into IMAX 3D format and released in select international IMAX theaters.

As with the first film, which did not have a theatrical release in China, the film's distributor Universal Pictures had troubles releasing the sequel. When it was reported in July 2013 that the film had been denied a theatrical release in China, then the second-largest film market in the world, some analysts attributed this to the protection of locally produced animation. There were also rumors that the film's release was banned in China because the film's minions too much resembled former Chinese president Jiang Zemin. China's Film Bureau was "furious" about the negative comments, stating that the film was not submitted for censorship approval. In fact, there was reportedly a "commercial conflict" between Universal and Edko Films, the film's local distributor, over which titles are to be imported. Edko had decided that the film "would not do well in China and decided against using one of the precious quota slots for the film." In December 2013, a few weeks after the Universal Pictures' announcement that it would open a Beijing office, it was reported that Despicable Me 2 would be theatrically released in China on January 10, 2014.

=== Home media ===
Universal Pictures Home Entertainment released Despicable Me 2 for digital download on November 26, 2013, and on Blu-ray, Blu-ray 3D, and DVD on December 10. Physical copies contain an audio commentary; behind-the-scenes featurettes, such as characterizations of Gru, his girls, the gadgets, the Minions, the evil Minions and El Macho; deleted scenes; an overview of Gru's equipment; short films Puppy, Panic in the Mailroom, and Training Wheels; and a visit in Illumination Studios Paris. A 4K Ultra HD Blu-ray version was released in 2017.

== Reception ==
=== Box office ===
Despicable Me 2 earned $368 million in the United States and Canada and $602.7 million in other territories, for a worldwide total of $971 million. It was the third-highest-grossing film of 2013. Deadline Hollywood calculated the film's net profit as $394.5 million, placing it third on their list of 2013's "Most Valuable Blockbusters". With a budget of $76 million, the film is the most profitable film in the 101-year history of Universal.

In the United States and Canada, Despicable Me 2 was released with The Lone Ranger on July 3, 2013, leading into the Independence Day holiday weekend. It earned $35 million on its first day, including $4.7 million from Tuesday night previews. The film made $24.5 million the following Thursday, the third-highest-ever total for the holiday behind Spider-Man: Far From Home ($25.1 million in 2019) and Transformers ($29 million in 2007). Despicable Me 2 debuted earning $142.1 million across 3,957 theaters, and grossed $82.5 million on its three-day opening weekend. Its second-weekend earnings dropped by 49% to $43 million, edging Grown Ups 2 and Pacific Rim. before being dethroned in its third week by The Conjuring. Despicable Me 2 completed its theatrical run in the United States and Canada on January 16, 2014.

Worldwide, on its first weekend, Despicable Me 2 opened only in Australia with $6.66 million, ahead of Monsters University (2013) which opened on the same weekend. The film set an opening-day record in Latvia. In total, it opened at number one in 67 territories, and set opening-weekend records among animated films in Latin America, Indonesia, Malaysia, Philippines, Vietnam, and Lebanon, as well as opening-weekend records among all films in South Africa and Venezuela. In Japan, it topped the box office ($3.3 million) beating Elsyium (2013). The film remained in the first position at the box office for two consecutive weekends during July 2013. The film's largest openings occurred in the United Kingdom ($22.5 million), China ($15.4 million), and Mexico ($14.9 million). In total earnings, its largest markets were the United Kingdom ($72.2 million), China ($53.0 million), and Mexico ($47.7 million).

=== Critical response ===
Despicable Me 2 has an approval rating of 75% based on 184 professional reviews on the review aggregator website Rotten Tomatoes, with an average rating of 6.7/10. Its critical consensus reads: "Despicable Me 2 offers plenty of eye-popping visual inventiveness and a number of big laughs." Metacritic (which uses a weighted average) assigned the film a score of 62 out of 100 based on 39 critics, indicating "generally favorable" reviews. Audiences polled by CinemaScore gave the film an average grade of "A" on an A+ to F scale.

Stephen Whitty of The Star-Ledger gave the film three stars out of four, writing: "Not only a fun cartoon but—that rare thing—a sequel which actually improves on the original." Mary Pols of Time wrote: "As a sequel it stands level with the first film, and may have the edge on it." Peter Travers of Rolling Stone also gave it three stars out of four, saying: "Co-directors Chris Renaud and Pierre Coffin, who do Minion voices expertly, never let up on the laughs. A fart joke in 3-D may not be three times as wacky, but the high spirits of Despicable Me 2 are irresistible fun." Michael Phillips of the Chicago Tribune wrote positively too, saying: "Steve Carell's Slavic inflections as Gru do the trick, as before. Wiig's clever hesitations and comic timing help save the day." Tom Russo of The Boston Globe wrote: "The scope of the 'toon espionage-adventure goings-on is surprisingly limited. But the filmmakers so clearly love working on these characters, their creative joy is infectious." Stephanie Merry of The Washington Post gave the film three stars out of four, saying "The animation is beguiling, particularly when Lucy drives her car into the ocean, transforming it into a submarine that scoots around sharks and fish."

Peter Debruge of Variety wrote: "While not quite as charming or unique as the original, Despicable Me 2 comes awfully close, extending co-directors Chris Renaud and Pierre Coffin's delightfully silly sensibility to a bit larger universe." Michael Rechtshaffen of The Hollywood Reporter wrote: "While the new edition doesn't quite catch that inspired spark, there's still plenty to enjoy here courtesy of those zippy visuals and a pitch-perfect voice cast led by the innately animated Steve Carell."

However, there was criticism, even from those who liked the film. Peter Hartlaub of the San Francisco Chronicle gave the film three stars out of four, saying: "It's a credit that the writing can be so funny in the moment, that it takes time to realize there's no cohesive story, zero dramatic tension and nary a practical lesson for either the characters in the film or the people watching in the theater." Soren Anderson of The Seattle Times gave it two-and-a-half stars out of four, writing: "It's fun. It's cheerful. It's lollipop colorful. Best of all, it features lots of minion mischief, which guarantees plenty of laughs. But what it doesn't have is an edge." Stephen Holden of The New York Times gave the film two-and-a-half stars out of five, saying: "It is consistently diverting and so cute you'll want to pet it. Yet it is also weightless and lacks a center."

Among the negative reviews, Tirdad Derakhshani of The Philadelphia Inquirer gave the movie two-and-a-half stars out of five, writing: "If you're looking for quality prepackaged, predigested Hollywood family fun this summer, you could do a lot worse than Despicable Me 2." Alonso Duralde of TheWrap also wrote negatively, saying: "The minions are still wacky scene-stealers—and once again, we don't get nearly enough of them—but Gru and his daughters have been blanded down to bad-sitcom level."

Claudia Puig of USA Today gave the film two stars out of four, saying: "With its predecessor having made a whopping $540 million globally, it's no wonder that Universal saw fit to order a sequel. But it's not enough just to trot out legions of minions and cobble together a plot. Audiences deserve more imagination and inventiveness than this wan recycling." Owen Gleiberman of Entertainment Weekly gave the film a 'C' grade, saying "By the end, every child in the audience will want his or her own monster-minion toy. Adults will just regret the way that Despicable Me 2 betrays the original film's devotion to bad-guy gaiety." A.A. Dowd of The A.V. Club also gave it a 'C' grade, writing: "What's missing—and this was the crucial component of part one—is a little sour to undercut the sweet. Like its protagonist, a bad guy gone boringly good, Despicable Me 2 has no edge. It's fatally nice and insufficiently naughty."

== Accolades ==
At the 86th Academy Awards, Despicable Me 2 received nominations for Best Animated Feature and Best Original Song. Among the film's nominations include ten Annie Awards (winning one), a British Academy Film Award, two Critics' Choice Movie Awards, and a Golden Globe Award.

== Sequels and prequels ==
Following the box-office take of Despicable Me 2, it enabled any additional Despicable Me film to improve the franchise's success. Spin-off prequels Minions (2015), Minions: The Rise of Gru (2022), and Minions & Monsters (2026); and sequels Despicable Me 3 (2017) and Despicable Me 4 (2024) have been released.
