= Gerianne Pérez =

American musical theatre actress (born 1990)

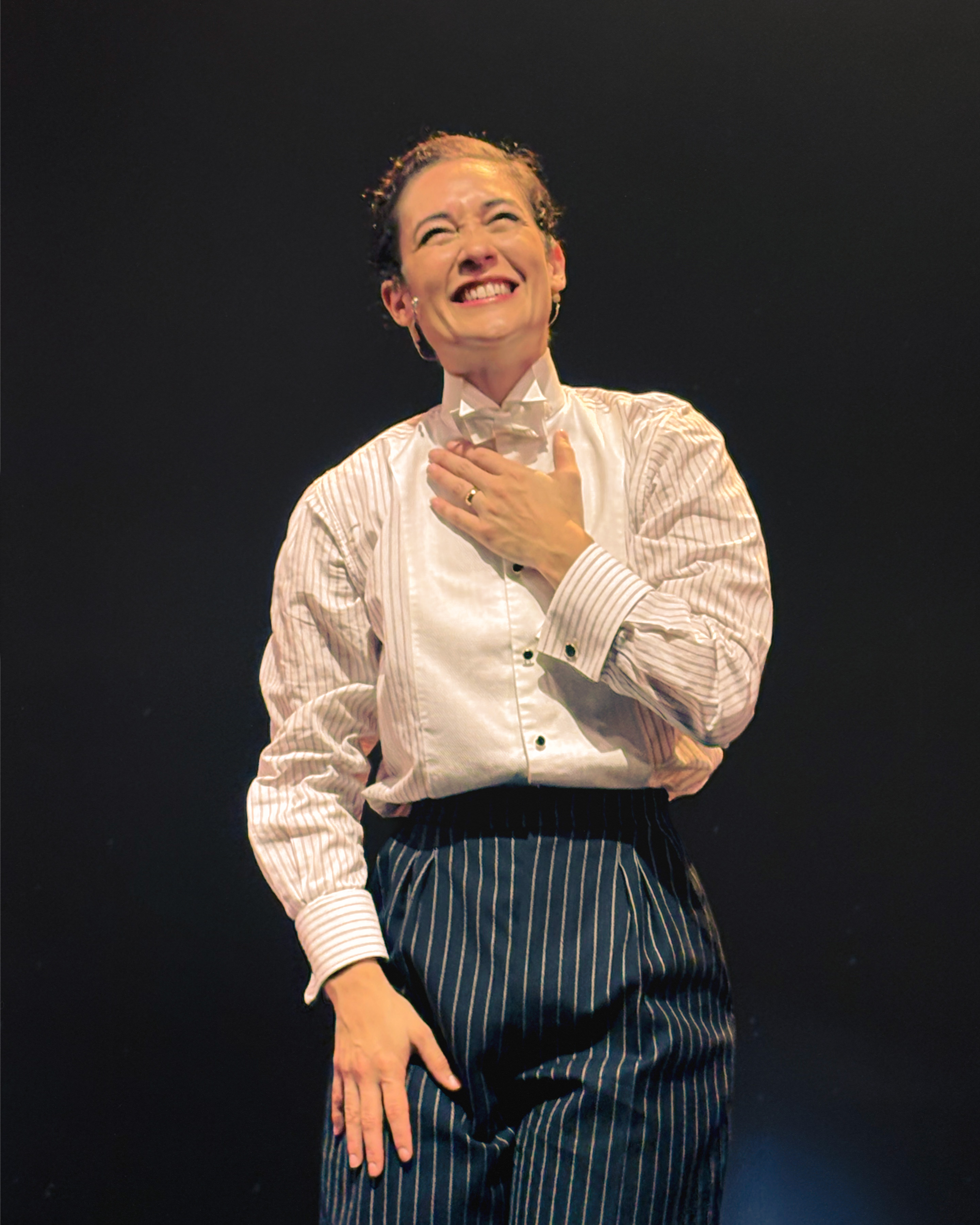
- Pérez at the curtain call of Operation Mincemeat
- Born: September 5, 1990 (age 35)
- Education: NYU Tisch (BFA Drama)
- Occupation: Actor
- Website: gerianneperez.com

Gerianne Pérez (born September 5, 1990) is an American musical theatre actress. She is best known for her roles in SIX, In Transit, and Operation Mincemeat.

== Early life and education ==
Pérez attended Spanaway Lake High School in Washington. As a teenager, she considered a future in medicine, wanting to go to an Ivy League school and become a neurologist. She ultimately decided to pursue a career in performance during her senior year of high school.

Pérez graduated from the NYU Tisch School of the Arts in 2013 with a Bachelor of Fine Arts, in addition to NYU's conservatory program at CAP21.

She is of Puerto Rican descent.

== Career ==
Her first notable role was in the award-winning 2013 production of Volleygirls at the Signature Theatre alongside Julia Knitel, Susan Blackwell, and Monica Raymund. Later that year, Pérez starred in Bubble Boy at Hamilton Stage at Union County Performing Arts Center. She played Chloe, the romantic lead. In 2014, she performed as Rizzo in Grease at North Shore Music Theatre. In 2015, she performed in a solo concert at 54 Below. In 2016, Pérez was a member of the a cappella group Vocalosity as part of their first national tour. The same year, she starred as Vanessa in a production of In the Heights at the Hangar Theatre.

Pérez made her Broadway debut in the 2017 a cappella musical In Transit, where she played the role of Kathy and understudied Ali. She reprised her role in the In Transit cast album.

Pérez joined the 2017 first US national tour of Waitress as a swing/ensemble member. The tour ended in 2019. In December 2019, she starred as Evelyn Noel in a production of Kris Kringle: the Musical at Proctor's Theatre. In April 2021, she reprised her role in Waitress on Broadway as part of its re-staging following the COVID-19 shutdown, and again in the 2022 US Residencies in North Carolina and Ohio.

In 2022, she was cast as Catherine of Aragon in the original US Boleyn Tour of SIX: The Musical. She received critical acclaim for her performance in the role.

As of 2026, Pérez is the first standby for the role of Ewen Montagu in the Broadway production of Operation Mincemeat.
