= The Ice Cream Truck =

- Directed by: Megan Elizabeth Freels Johnston
- Written by: Megan Elizabeth Freels Johnston
- Produced by: Megan Elizabeth Freels Johnston, YuMee Jang, and Omid Shamsoddini
- Starring: Deanna Russo; John Redlinger; Emil Johnsen; Hilary Barraford; Jeff Daniel Phillips; Lisa Ann Walter
- Cinematography: Stephen Tringali
- Edited by: Eric Potter
- Music by: Michael Boateng
- Release date: August 18, 2017
- Country: United States
- Language: English

The Ice Cream Truck is an American psychological horror/thriller film, written and directed by Megan Elizabeth Freels Johnston, granddaughter of crime writer Elmore Leonard, and starring Deanna Russo, John Redlinger, Emil Johnsen, Hilary Barraford, Jeff Daniel Phillips and Lisa Ann Walter.

It was released on August 18, 2017. It is produced by Megan Freels Johnston, YuMee Jang and Omid Shamsoddini.

== Plot ==
Mary (Deanna Russo) moves back to her hometown, and is quickly reminded of the quietude of suburban life. But when her neighbors start to die, she suspects that the culprit might be a strange man who drives a local ice-cream truck in this horror comedy.

== Cast ==
- Deanna Russo as Mary
- John Redlinger as Max
- Emil Johnsen as the Ice Cream Man
- Hilary Barraford as Jessica
- Jeff Daniel Phillips as Delivery Man
- Lisa Ann Walter as Christina
- Sam Schweikert as Nick
- Bailey Anne Borders as Tracy
- Dan Sutter as Frank
- Dana Gaier as Brie
- Declan Michael Laird as Joe
- LaTeace Towns-Cuellar as Katie
- Miles Johnston as Wil
- Mark Scheibmeir as Food Delivery Guy
- Wes O'Lee as Max's Uncle

== Reception ==
On the review aggregator website Rotten Tomatoes, 68% of 19 critics' reviews are positive.
