= Big Dogs =

- Genre: Crime Drama; Thriller
- Created by: Adam Dunn
- Based on: The More series by Adam Dunn
- Starring: Brett Cullen; Manny Perez; Michael Rabe; Louis Carbonneau; Dennis Flanagan; Micheál Richardson; Declan Michael Laird
- Country of origin: United States
- Original language: English
- No. of seasons: 1
- No. of episodes: 8

Production
- Executive producers: Adam Dunn; Tony Glazer; Summer Crockett Moore; Alan Neigher
- Production location: New York City
- Camera setup: Single-camera
- Production companies: Choice Films; Aurelian Productions

Original release
- Network: Prime Video/Tubi
- Release: July 1, 2020 – present

Big Dogs is an American crime drama TV series created by Adam Dunn based on his More series of novels.

== Cast ==
=== Main ===
- Brett Cullen as Captain McKeutchen
- Manny Perez as Sixto Santiago
- Michael Rabe as More
- Louis Carbonneau as Liesl
- Dennis Flanagan as Turse
- Micheál Richardson as Renny
- Declan Michael Laird as Prince William

=== Recurring ===
- Imran Sheikh as Arun
- Lance Henriksen as Totentatz
- Dave Shalansky as Agent Gilliard

== Episodes ==
No.	Episode	Directed by	Written by	Original release date
1	"Noricum Ripense"	David Platt	Unknown	July 1, 2021
2	"As Seen on TV"	David Platt	Unknown	July 1, 2021
3	"Things I've Done"	Darnell Martin	Unknown	July 1, 2021
4	"All for None"	Darnell Martin	Unknown	July 1, 2021
5	"All Eyes on Thee"	Matthew Penn	Unknown	July 1, 2021
6	"Nation of Men"	Matthew Penn	Unknown	July 1, 2021
7	"Rome and Everything After"	Tony Glazer	Unknown	July 1, 2021
8	"Into the Blurring Dead"	Tony Glazer	Unknown	July 1, 2021

== Development ==
In May 2017, it was announced Choice Films and Adam Dunn's Aurelian Productions were teaming to develop Big Dogs, a new drama series based on Dunn's futuristic crime books, with director David Platt (Law & Order: Special Victims Unit) attached to helm the first two episodes. Each book in Dunn's More series of novels will be the basis for its own season.

== Casting ==
In July 2017, it was announced Lance Henriksen, Ana Isabelle and Micheál Richardson had joined the cast.
