= Declan Michael Laird =

Scottish actor

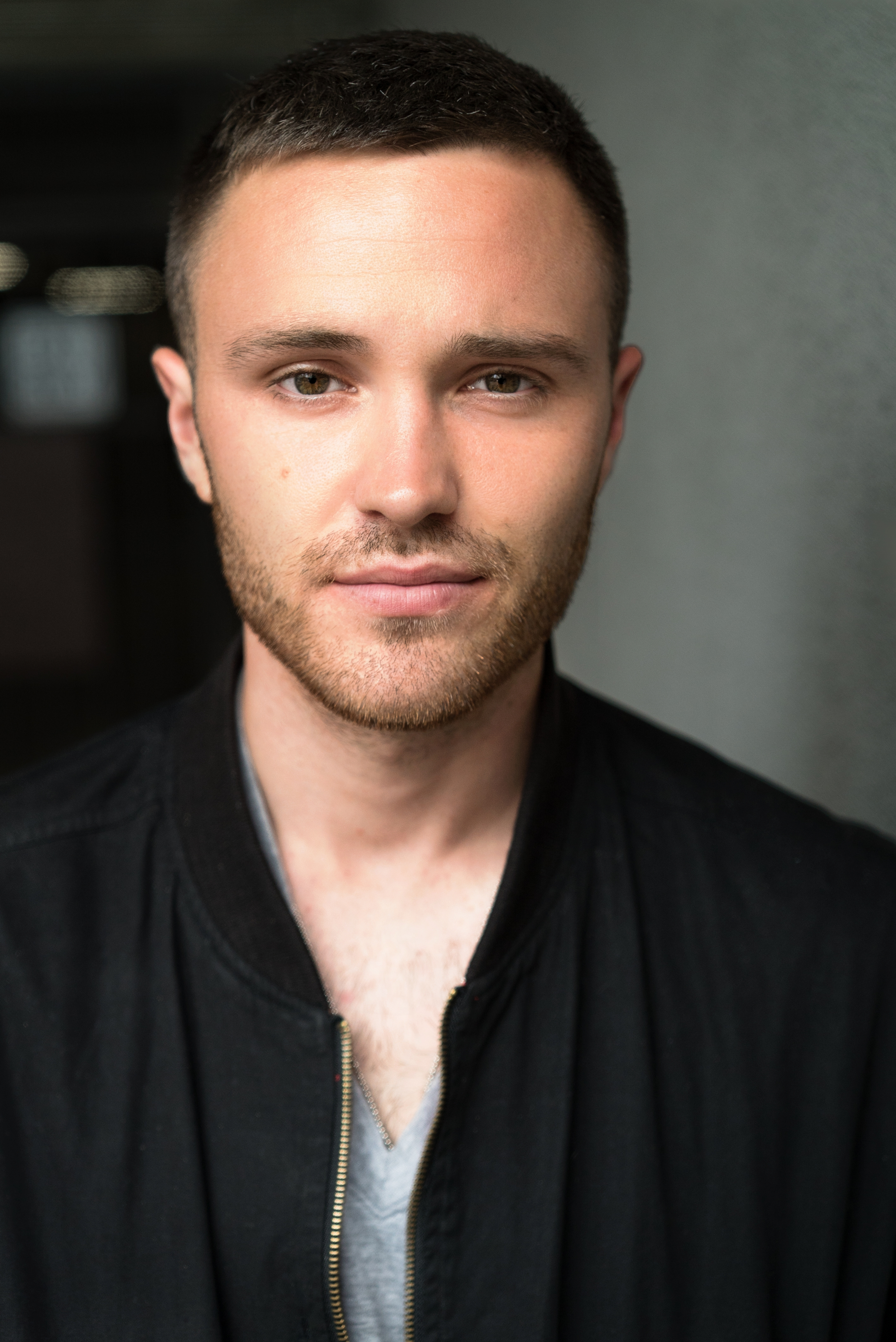
- Born: Greenock, Inverclyde, Scotland
- Education: Stella Adler Studio of Acting
- Occupation: Actor
- Years active: 2008–present
- Notable work: Hot Air; Big Dogs; Beautiful Disaster

Declan Michael Laird (born 1993) is a Scottish actor and a graduate of the Stella Adler Studio of Acting. He is possibly best known for his roles in Hot Air, Big Dogs, Beautiful Disaster and Beautiful Wedding.

== Life and acting career ==
Declan Michael Laird was born in Greenock, Scotland. A keen footballer, he left school at 16 to pursue a professional career, signing with Greenock Morton F.C. and shortly after making his professional debut in a preseason friendly against Heart of Midlothian F.C.

In 2009, he was introduced to an acting agency by longterm friend Jim Sweeney and landed the role of Sean in the Scottish soap opera River City and went on to appear in a number of episodes before departing in 2011. The following year he starred in the critically acclaimed short film, The Lost Purse in which Laird played the leading role of The Kid. The film, which told the story a young deaf man, was well received and earned Laird a Best Acting accolade at the Write Camera Action event in Glasgow in 2012.

In 2011, whilst on holiday in Los Angeles, Laird was convinced by his father to take part in an acting workshop hosted by the Stella Adler Studio of Acting. Initially hesitant to take part, Laird was eventually bribed $50 by his father and despite having no previous acting training, the staff were so impressed by his performance that they offered Laird a fully funded scholarship for the young actor to study in America. In 2014, he landed the role of Colin in the American online drama Camp Abercorn. The series, which premiered in September 2014, was crowd funded online and was endorsed by former Star Trek actor George Takei.

In May 2016, it was announced on the Stella Adler alumni website that Laird had been cast as Joe in The Ice Cream Truck. In June, Camp Abercorn received its first major screening in America playing at the 2016 edition of SeriesFest. Laird also appeared in two BuzzFeed videos where he took on the challenge of taste testing pumpkin spice lattes from 5 popular coffee chains, and starred alongside Carmen Electra promoting Dollar Shave Club blades and products.

In 2017, Laird featured in the Amazon Prime Production of Tom Clancy's Ghost Recon Wildlands: War Within The Cartel playing the role of CIA Analyst Ryan Williams. 2017 saw Laird star in the horror comedy film The Ice Cream Truck. In September, Laird completed filming on the feature comedy film Hot Air starring Steve Coogan and Taylor Russell. The Frank Coraci directed film was released in theaters in 2018. 2018 also saw Laird complete filming for the TV series Big Dogs, which premiered on the streaming service Tubi in 2019. The show did not get renewed for a second season.

In 2018, Laird completed filming for the thriller Green Rush, which was produced by UFC hall of famer Urijah Faber. Laird played the role of Caleb Hayes and also is credited as being a co-producer on the movie. The film was distributed by Lionsgate in 2019 via VOD.

In 2021, Laird completed filming for Beautiful Disaster which stars Dylan Sprouse and Virginia Gardner. Laird played the role of Taylor Maddox. The movie was directed by Roger Kumble and shot on location in Bulgaria. The movie was released worldwide in theaters via Fathom Events in April 2023. Upon release of the film, it was also announced that Laird had completed filming for the sequel, Beautiful Wedding, on location in the Dominican Republic in November 2022. The film was released theatrically in January 2024.

In 2023, Laird appeared on Better Human Better Dog with Cesar Milan to help his German Shepherd rescue dog, Rocky. Laird and his girlfriend, Starsi Howell, appeared in season 3 episode 9 of the National Geographic series. The episode aired in March 2023.

In 2025, Laird had two theatrically released feature films; the first being Under Fire directed by Steven C. Miller in which he starred alongside Dylan Sprouse and Mason Gooding. The second being The Roughneck which was directed by Kyle Rankin. He also starred in the prestige audio series, Unsinkable starring Brian Cox, Thomas Brodie-Sangster, John Malkovich & Nathalie Emmanuel. The audio series depicted the true-life events and most extraordinary tales of heroism, fortitude and seamanship of WW2, based on the true story of the cargo ship MV San Demetrio. Laird depicted the real-life role of John Boyle, an engine room worker aboard the MV San Demetrio who was originally from Laird's hometown of Greenock.

== Personal life ==
In 2013, he was listed as one of the top 50 Glaswegian Tweeters on Twitter by the Herald newspaper in Scotland.

== Filmography ==
=== Film ===
Year(s)	Title	Role	Notes
2011	On Road City of Deception	Smiler	Short film
2012	The Lost Purse	The Kid	Short film
2014	Lost Angels	Brad Beckman	
2015	Further Instructions	Detective Bradley	
2015	2017	The Ice Cream Truck	Joe
Blood Brothers	2017	William	Short film
Khali the Killer	2017	Mormon	
2018	Hot Air	Gennady Vahkrov	
2020	Green Rush	Caleb Hayes	
2023	Beautiful Disaster	Taylor Maddox	
2024	Beautiful Wedding	Taylor Maddox	
2025	Under Fire	Spotter	
2025	The Roughneck	Scooter	

=== Television ===
Year(s)	Title	Role	Notes
2009 - 2011	River City	Sean	
2015	Camp Abercorn	Colin	Web series
2017	Tom Clancy's Ghost Recon Wildlands: War Within The Cartel	CIA Analyst Ryan Williams	Television film
2020	Big Dogs	Prince William	
2023	Better Human Better Dog	Self	

== Awards and nominations ==
Year	Nominated Work	Awards	Category	Result
2012	The Lost Purse	Write Camera Action	Best Actor	Won
2012	The Lost Purse	The Scottish Short Film Festival	Best Actor	Won
