= Ryah Nixon =

American actress

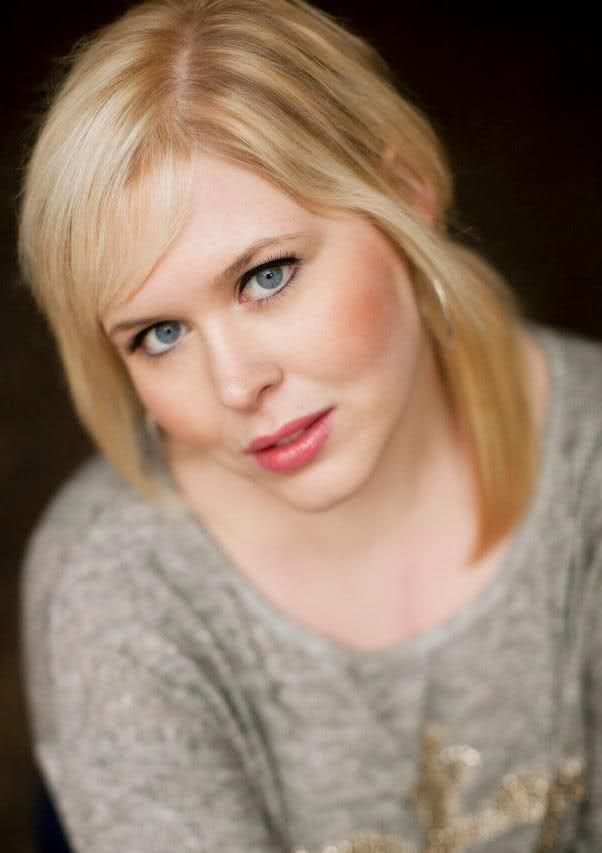
- Ryah Nixon
- Born: Ryah Nixon; New York, NY
- Occupations: Actor, singer

Ryah Nixon is a graduate of the Carnegie Mellon University School of Drama, class of 2009. Classmates include: Kyle Beltran (In the Heights), Hunter Ryan Herdlicka (A Little Night Music), Steffanie Leigh (Mary Poppins), and Ian Harding (Pretty Little Liars). She is originally from Seattle, Washington and attended Roosevelt High School.

Nixon appeared in the 2009 production of Fat Camp the musical at NYMF, and made her off-Broadway debut in Another Part of the Forest playing the role of Laurette. She also appeared in the season one episode "Double Date/Mom" of the television series Louie on the FX network. On June 10, 2012, Nixon appeared in an episode of Head Games titled "Moral Dilemma" on The Discovery Channel.

Nixon then joined the first national tour of 9 to 5: the musical. She performed in the ensemble and worked as an understudy for Doralee and Judy Bernley. Nixon replaced Diana Degarmo as the lead in the final leg of the tour. She received a Broadwayworld Award for her performance of "Doralee Rhodes" on tour. Nixon closed the national tour as Doralee Rhodes on July 31, 2011.

Nixon played Kate McGowan in the 5th Avenue Theatre's Concert Version of Titanic, which commemorated the 100th Anniversary of the ship's sinking. Following that, she played Maureen in RENT at Seattle's Tony Award-winning regional 5th Avenue Theatre in summer of 2012. She played Alice Russell in Lizzie, a musical based on the story of Lizzie Borden, at New York City's off-Broadway house Ars Nova. She also recorded the vocals for its official soundtrack.

Nixon has been involved in all industry readings of Jawbreaker, the musical, playing the role of "Foxy" (which was played by Julie Benz in the movie). She played Magenta in the Bucks County Playhouse production of Rocky Horror Show in October 2014. Nixon starred as Lulu in the out of town try out Moonshine: that Heehaw Musical at Dallas Theatre Center in summer of 2015.

In 2021, it was announced that Ryah would star as Doralee Rhodes in North Carolina Theatres production of 9 to 5.
