= Cinco Paul and Ken Daurio =

American screenwriters

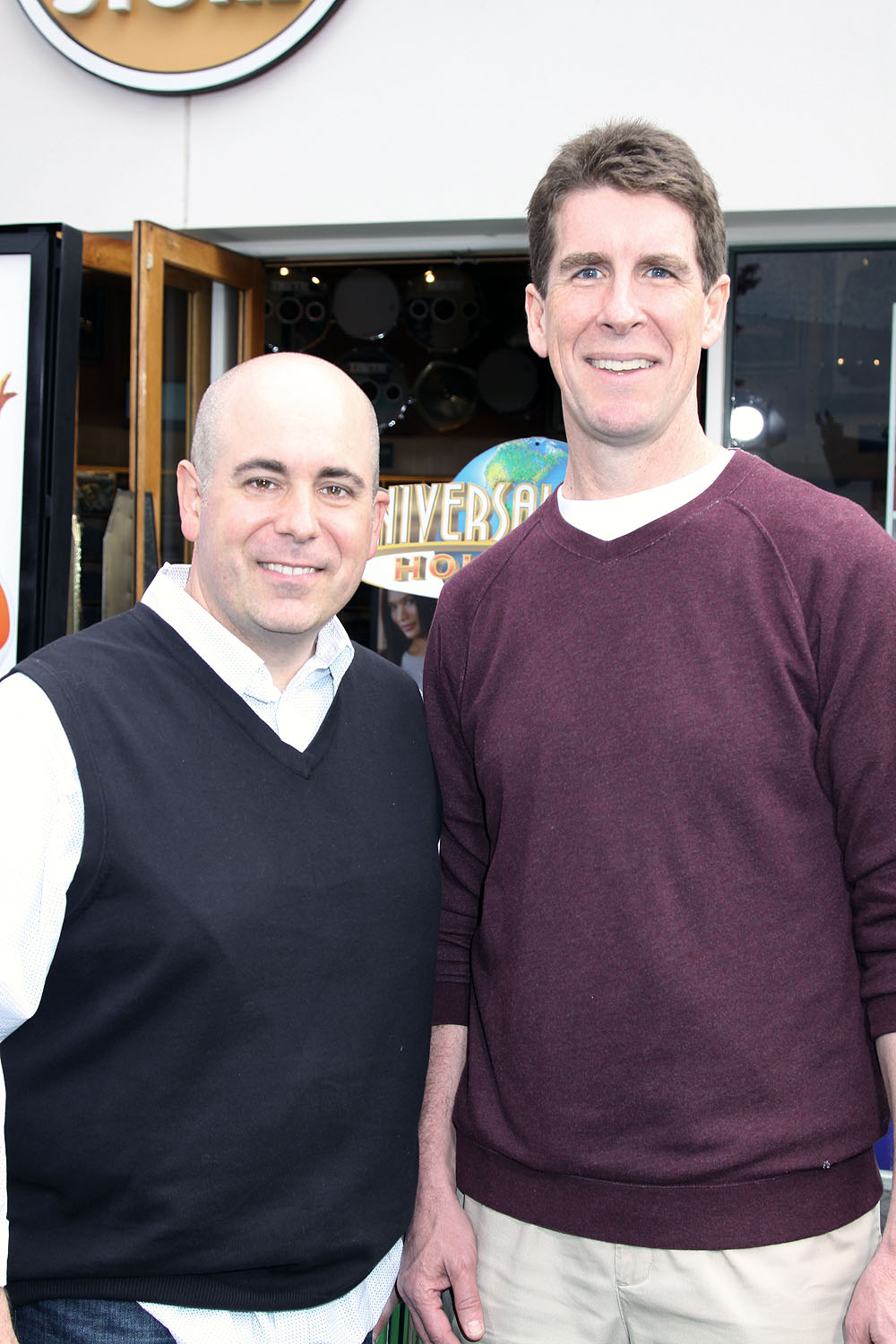
- Paul (right) and Daurio (left) in 2011
- Born: Cinco Paul; May 5, 1964 (age 62); Phoenix, Arizona, U.S. Ken Daurio; 1971 or 1972 (age 54–55)
- Education: Paul: Yale University (BA); University of Southern California (MFA)
- Occupation: Screenwriters
- Children: 3 (Paul); 3 (Daurio)

Cinco Paul (born May 5, 1964) and Ken Daurio (born 1971/1972) are American screenwriters, collaborating on the screenplays for animated films including the Despicable Me franchise, Horton Hears a Who, The Lorax and The Secret Life of Pets. The duo also served as the co-creators of the 2021 Apple TV+ musical comedy series Schmigadoon!, with Paul also serving as the series songwriter and executive producer.

== Life and career ==
=== Paul ===
Paul was born on May 5, 1964, and thus was named after the Mexican celebration called Cinco de Mayo, which is Spanish for "Fifth of May". He grew up in Phoenix, Arizona, where he attended Brophy College Prep.After graduating from Yale University, Paul served a mission for the Church of Jesus Christ of Latter-day Saints in Tokyo. Shortly after returning from his mission he married his girlfriend whom he had met at Yale and to whom he was engaged just before leaving on his mission. He then won a short film competition and received a fellowship at the USC School of Cinematic Arts, where he graduated in 1993 from the Graduate Screenwriting Program. The following year, he sold his first screenplay to Columbia Pictures.

=== Daurio ===
Daurio started making films with a Super 8 camera at age 9. After high school, he began directing music videos and directed more than 100 videos.

=== Collaboration ===
Paul and Daurio began collaborating in 1999. They met when Paul wrote a musical for the Church of Jesus Christ of Latter-day Saints's 150-year celebration of the pioneers' arrival in Utah, in which Daurio was one of the leads.

Hitting it off, having similar senses of humor, they formed a band called the Otter Pops, playing at local outdoor malls. Within a year they sold their first script, and a year later their second script, Bubble Boy, was made into a film, which was a critical and commercial failure. To get noticed, they used to sing story pitches to film producers. Although not always successful, this strategy resulted in several produced films, including Bubble Boy and College Road Trip (2008).

They were personally chosen by Audrey Geisel, the widow of Dr. Seuss, to write the screenplay for the film Horton Hears a Who!, an animated adaptation of the children's book Horton Hears a Who!, for Blue Sky Studios via 20th Century Fox Animation, led by Chris Meledandri. In 2007, when Meledandri founded the production company Illumination Entertainment, Paul and Daurio followed him.

At Illumination, they wrote screenplays for the highly-successful animated film Despicable Me and its sequels, Despicable Me 2 and Despicable Me 3. They also wrote for Illumination's other films, the live action/animated Easter-themed Hop and adapted the Dr. Seuss book The Lorax into a film.

When Paul and Daurio were screenwriting partners, they preferred to work independently. They divided up scenes and read pages to each other, trying to make each other laugh. Paul, having an education in screenwriting, generally worked on scenes that contain emotion and require the three-act structure, while Daurio, being a more visually oriented person, usually did scenes with action, sight gags and physical comedy. Both being members of The Church of Jesus Christ of Latter-day Saints, their beliefs have had significant impact on their careers. They prefer "to write movies that are uplifting, optimistic and for everybody," while avoiding being "preachy".

The pair adapted Bubble Boy into a stage musical featuring original songs, for which an original cast recording was released on Sh-K-Boom Records in 2017, produced by Paul, Justin Goldner and Kurt Deutsch.

On January 29, 2018, Paul and Daurio were hired to write a film adaptation of Birthright for Universal Pictures and Skybound Entertainment.

=== Split ===
In 2019, Paul and Daurio sold their TV pitch for Schmigadoon! to Apple TV+, but Daurio departed from the series during pre-production, uncomfortable with the more adult content and the responsibilities of showrunning. Paul continued as showrunner on his own as he finished writing and producing season one of the series, then was also the sole composer and showrunner for season two. The two have not worked together professionally since, although the split was amicable and they remain close friends, even hosting a podcast called Make Him Watch It, in which they make each other watch films they have never seen.

=== Daurio post-split ===
After leaving Schmigadoon!, Daurio went back to working for Illumination, providing additional writing for Migration and co-writing Despicable Me 4. By July 2025, he was hired to script a film adaptation of Zita the Spacegirl for Timothy Reckart's Sycamore Studios.

=== Paul post-split ===
Paul continued as showrunner and composer for both seasons of Schmigadoon!, winning the Primetime Emmy Award for Outstanding Music and Lyrics in 2022 for his song "Corn Puddin'".

In 2021, he published the rhyming children's book Clayton Parker Really Really Really Has to Pee, which was illustrated by Gladys Jose.

Paul also co-wrote the original musical comedy A.D. 16, with playwright Bekah Brunstetter. It revolves around a teenage Mary Magdalene developing a crush on teenage Jesus of Nazareth. The musical was produced in early 2022 by the Olney Theatre Center in Olney, Maryland, receiving a rave review from The Washington Post. It won the Edgerton Foundation New Play Award and a Helen Hayes Award for Outstanding Choreography in a Musical.

In early 2022, it was announced that Paul was attached as a writer and director to the hybrid live-action and stop-motion animation film Winter Wonderland, also writing original songs for the project.

Paul wrote the book, music, lyrics for the stage musical adaptation of Schmigadoon!, which won the 2026 Tony Award for Best Musical. Paul personally won the awards for Best Original Score and Best Book.

== Writing credits ==
- Bubble Boy (2001)
- The Santa Clause 2 (2002)
- Horton Hears a Who! (2008)
- College Road Trip (2008)
- Despicable Me (2010)
- Hop (2011)
- The Lorax (2012) (Also executive producers)
- Despicable Me 2 (2013)
- The Secret Life of Pets (2016)
- Weenie (2016) (Also directors)
- Despicable Me 3 (2017)
- Schmigadoon! (2021–2023) - creators, writers, songwriter (Paul only), and executive producer (Paul only)
- Migration (2023) (Daurio only, additional writing)
- Despicable Me 4 (2024) (Daurio only)
- Ladies First (2026) (Paul only)
