= John Gaffney (actor) =

Scottish actor

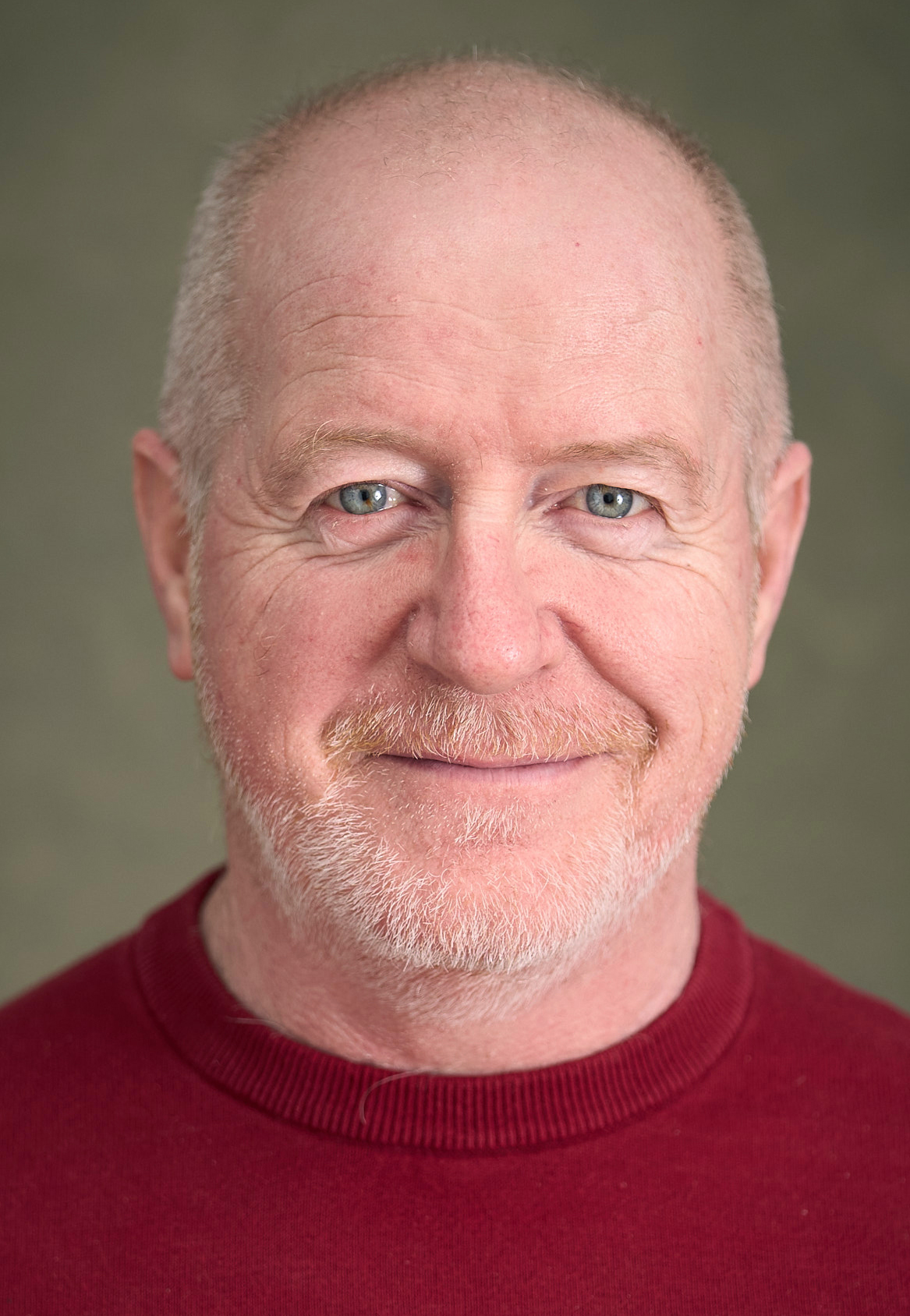
- Born: Hamilton, Scotland
- Occupation: Actor
- Years active: 1994–present
- Notable work: Electric Faces; Broken Record; The Priest with Two Guns; Night Is Day; "The Crews" "Defender" "Concrete Jungle" "SPLAIN" "Crime Movie"

John Gaffney is a Scottish actor.

== Life and career ==
John Gaffney was born in Hamilton in Scotland and moved to the island of Jersey in 1983. It was here where he got a taste for acting after being approached to take on a stage role by a local theatre director whilst singing in a night club. Upon returning to Scotland in 1992, Gaffney was offered a place on an acting course at the prestigious Royal Conservatoire of Scotland (formally the Royal Scottish Academy of Music and Drama) but family commitments forced him to decline the opportunity and instead decided to return to his trade as a plasterer.

It was 1994 that Gaffney first stepped in front of the camera to take on the role of an abusive father in the short "Garys Day Out" for director Steve Pang, A semi autobiographical on Pang himself, An Emotional journey for Pang. In 2008, Gaffney returned to acting with small parts in short films including R.E.M, Hush, and A Spanking in Paradise. In 2011 he landed his first major role, starring as Dougie Fallon in the independently made television series The Crews. Starring alongside David Hayman and Stephen McCole, Gaffney's character Fallon was a high level member of a drug-dealing gang in Glasgow who has risen through the ranks of the criminal underworld. Despite a successful first series, the programme failed to find a buyer amongst the television studios including STV and BBC Scotland. The following year, Gaffney landed the role of Superintendent Charles Sloan in the feature Sci Fi film Night is Day. The film tells the story of Jason McKenzie, a vigilante super hero operating in Glasgow fighting crime whilst Sloan attempts to dismiss McKenzies existence and silence all tales of the real-life superhero. The film premiered at the 2012 edition of the Glasgow Film Festival.

Starring opposite Duncan Airlie James, 2013 saw Gaffney star as Liverpudlian gangster called Butler in the short film The Priest with Two Guns. The character, known as 'Butler the Bookie' is owed money by the brother of Father O'Reilly (played by James) who is being held hostage until the debt is repaid. The film picked up the Grand Jury Prize at the 2014 Amsterdam Film Festival. In the same year, Gaffney also made appearances in the short films V for Visa and "Doug And Steves Big Holy Adventure" by John McPhail and Blink by Colin Ross Smith.

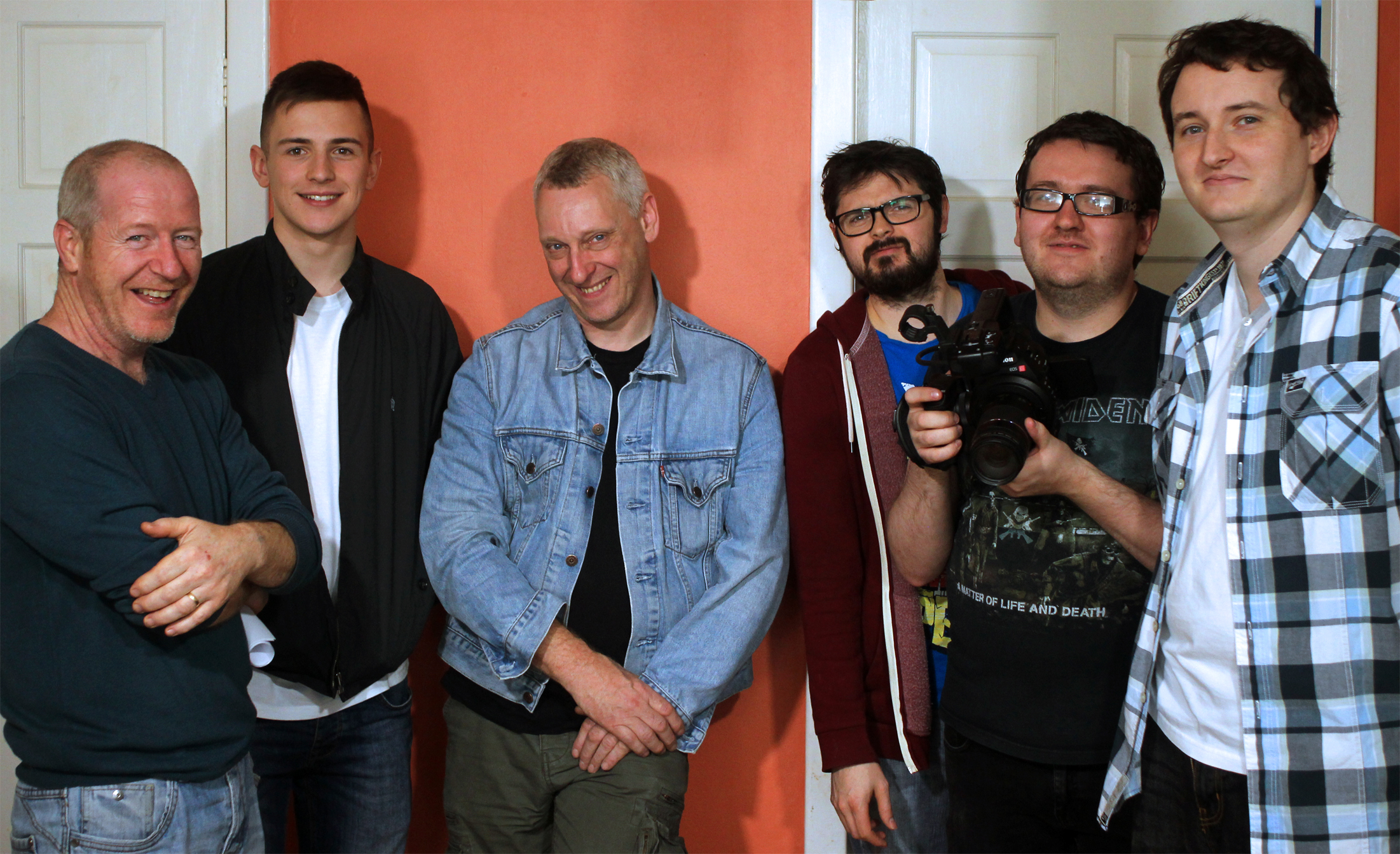
Cast and crew of Broken Record (L-R) John Gaffney, Darren McColl, Steven Patrick, Andy S. McEwan, Paul Michael Egan, Chris Quick

In 2014, Gaffney was approached by Andy S. McEwan to play the role of Tam in the short comedy film Broken Record. The film saw Gaffney star as part of a comedy duo with Steven Patrick where they played a couple of house clearance workers in the 1990s who think they have stumbled upon hidden treasure in the form of old gramophone records. The film was widely praised by critics in both the United Kingdom and the United States. Josh Samford of RogueCinema wrote:

"The actors, particularly John Gaffney and Steven Patrick, get the beats of the comedy and they know what they’re trying to achieve. There’s a sort of sadness to the stupidity of these characters, but the actors infuse their dimwitted follies with a lot of energy and the short reflects this overall."

Fred McNamara of ScreenRelish also added:

"Their endearing performances even possess some maverick black humour when Tam suggests they murder a fellow decorator off who wants in on their discovery."

The film later appeared in a number of British film festivals including the Loch Ness Film Festival in Inverness and the Portobello Film Festival in London. Later that year, Gaffney was recommended by Chris Quick to director Johnny Herbin who was casting for his short film Electric Faces. Quick, a producer on the film, suggested Gaffney was an ideal candidate to play the part of Lucas after working with him on the set of Broken Record. Herbin agreed with the decision and Gaffney was cast in the role and began filming his scenes in the summer of 2014. The film is due for release in 2015. He will also appear in Where Do We Go From Here, the first feature film of Scottish director John McPhail.

== Filmography ==
=== Film ===
Year	Title	Director	Role	Notes
1994	Gary's Day Out	Steve Pang	Father	Short Film
2008	R.E.M	Stuart Gilmartin	Doctor	Short Film
2010	Hush	Fraser Coull	Driver	Short Film
2010	A Spanking in Paradise	Wayne Thallon	Jimmy	Short Film
2012	Night Is Day: The Movie	Fraser Coull	Superintendent Charles Sloan	Feature Film
2012	In This Town	Andrew MacKenzie	The driver	Short Film
2012	Mirror God	Bernd Porr	Father	Short Film
2013	The Priest with Two Guns	Rodney Reynold	Butler	Short Film
2013	V for Visa	John McPhail	Tramp	Short Film
2013	Traitor	Colin Ross Smith	Michael	Short Film
2013	Blink	Colin Ross Smith	Blinker	Short Film
2013	Doug & Steve's Big Holy Adventure	John McPhail	The Priest	Short Film
2014	Glory Hunter	Craig Maclachlan	Joe McGill	Short Film
2014	Broken Record	Andy S. McEwan	Tam	Short Film
2014	The Flaw	Allan Benzies	The Engineer	Short Film
2014	The Graduates	Sean Paul Wilkie	Policeman	Short Film
2015	Electric Faces	Johnny Herbin	Lucas	Short Film
2015	Where Do We Go From Here	John McPhail	Male Nurse	Feature Film
2015	Crime Lord	David Paul Baker	Logan Mackenzie	Feature Film
2015	Crime	Carter Ferguson	Coleman	Short Film
2016	Cleek	Gary J Hewitt	Raymond	Feature Film
2018	One Night in Flanders	Paul Darroch	Sergeant John Dunbar	Short Film
2019	Hard Boiled	Gary McLellan	Detective Mulligan	Short Film
2020	Autumn Never Dies	Chris Quick	Black Eye Tam	Short Film
2023	Lock & Load	Nathan Shepka	Darren Bundy	Feature Film
2023	A Second Chance	Paul Darroch	Jake	Short Film

=== Television ===
Year	Title	Director	Role	Notes
2011	The Crews	Colin Ross Smith	Dougie Fallon	6 Episodes
2012	River City	Jim Sheilds	Clerk Of The Court	1 Episode
2018	Crime Lord	David Wilde	Logan Mackenzie	3 Episodes

=== Stage ===
Year	Title	Director	Role	Company
1990	Playboys	Pat Du Bra	Greg McIntosh	Jersey Drama Society
2012	Them And Us	Mark Boggis	Dad	RBA Productions/Procurator Fiscal
2012	Love Hate Crime	Mark Boggis	Father	Procurator Fiscals Office
2013	Mad Mitch	Kolin Ferguson	Robber	DeMure Media
2013	Mad Mitch	Kolin Ferguson	Micheal/Born Again Christian	DeMure Media
2014	The Graduates	Sean Paul Wilkie	Policeman	Trifecta Productions

== Awards ==
Year	Nominated Work	Awards	Category	Result
2022	Autumn Never Dies	Scotland International Festival of Cinema	Best Ensemble Cast in a Featurette (Shared with All Cast)	Nominated
