= Quick Off The Mark Productions =

Film & television production company

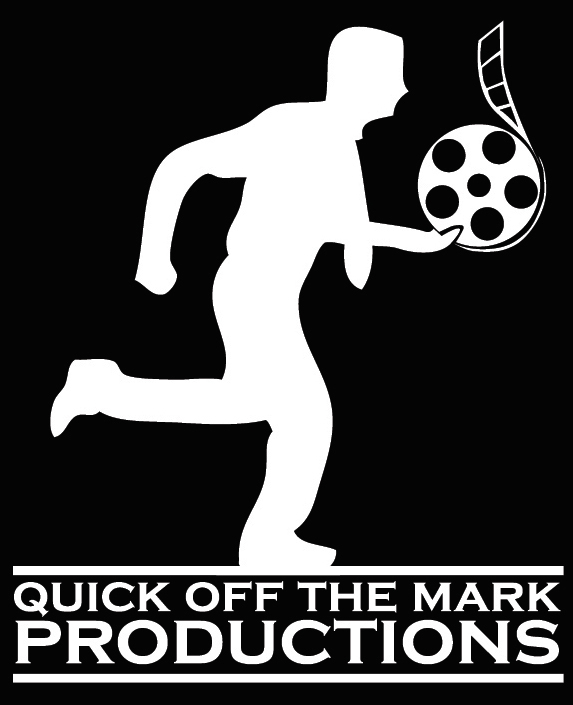
- Type: Private company limited by shares
- Industry: Motion pictures Television production
- Founded: 9 October 2009
- Founders: Mark D. Ferguson; Chris Quick
- Defunct: 7 June 2016
- Fate: Disbanded
- Headquarters: Glasgow, Scotland, United Kingdom
- Products: Motion pictures Television Production
- Website: Company Website

Quick Off The Mark Productions was a film & television production company operating in Glasgow, Scotland from 9 October 2009 to 7 June 2016. It was possibly best known for the films In Search of La Che and The Greyness of Autumn.

== History ==
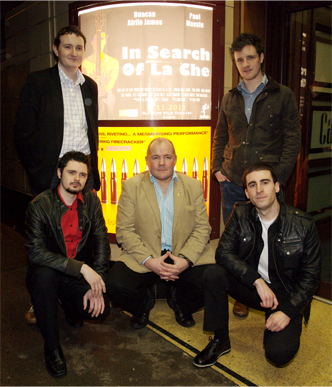
In Search of La Che premiere at the Glasgow Film Theatre.

Quick Off The Mark Productions was formed on 9 October 2009 by Mark D. Ferguson and Chris Quick. Its first main project was Butter Side Down a claymation series about a man's campaign to save the traditional light bulb from extinction. In 2010 work began on their first feature film In Search of La Che, a mockumentary which followed John Tavish (Played by Duncan Airlie James) and his quest to track down fictional rock star Roxy La Che. The film premiered at the Glasgow Film Theatre on 9 November 2011 and was later selected to appear at the 2014 American Online Film Awards. In 2013, the company made the headlines on CNN following the death of Margaret Thatcher. The news channel, which was discussing portrayals of the former Prime Minister in film, spoke of Steve Nallon's performance from In Search Of La Che, in which Thatcher plays a part in the life story of fictional rock star, Roxy La Che.

The company was involved in the filming of a wide variety of live kickboxing, wrestling and MMA shows in and around Glasgow. In particular, Quick Off The Mark Productions was responsible for the coverage of every show of the Katana Fighting Series which was run by Duncan Airlie James. The shows which ran from 2010 to 2013 were often refereed by John Blackledge and attracted guest appearances from former fighters including Ernesto Hoost.

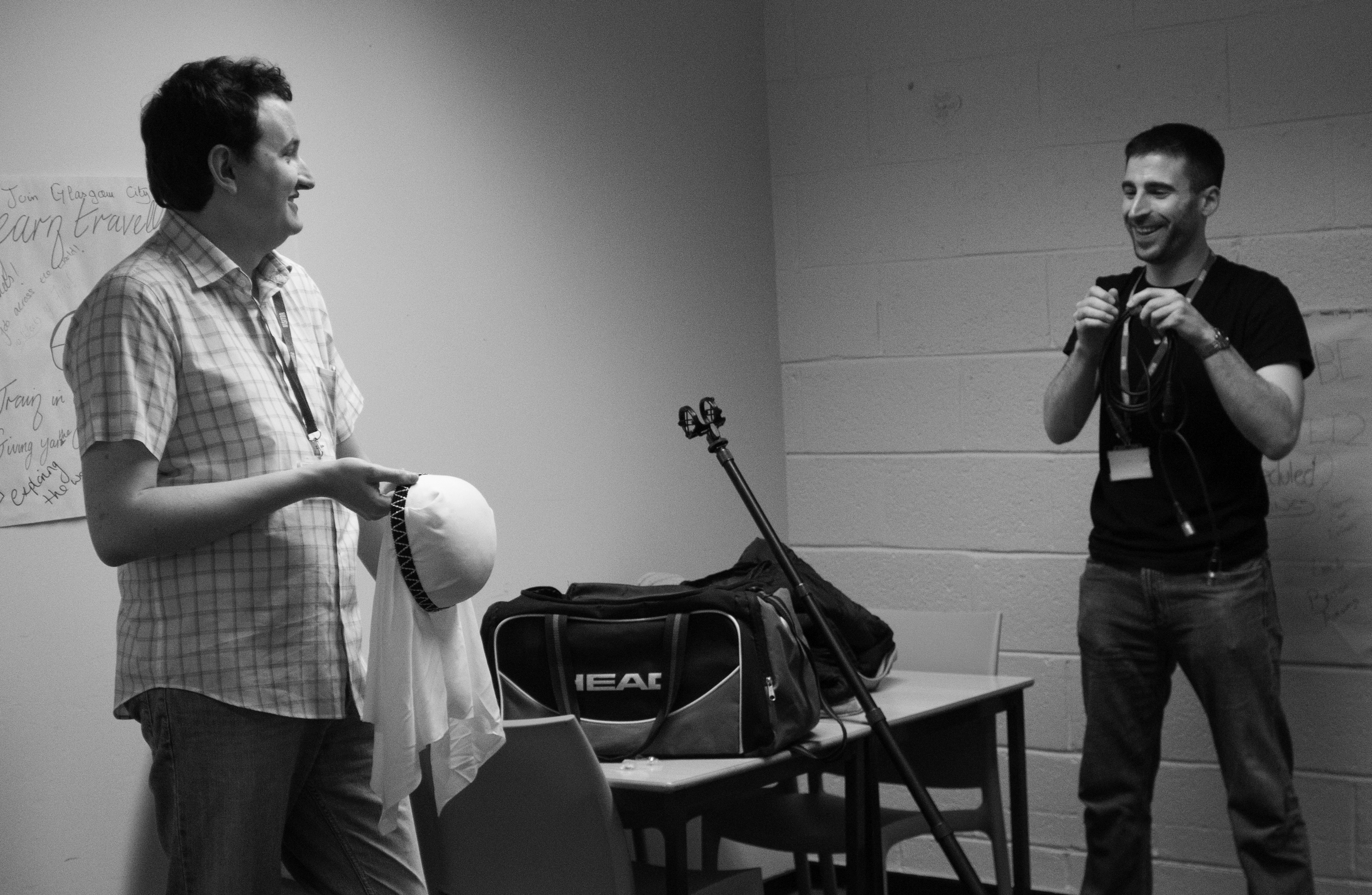
Mark D. Ferguson and Chris Quick on set together for the last time shooting the teaser tailer for Autumn Never Dies.

In 2012, the company produced a behind the scenes documentary in association with the Burns Museum in Ayr about the services run by the local charity Recovery Ayr and its upcoming custom pantomime Tam O'Shanter: The Mornin Eftir. In the same year, Quick Off The Mark Productions released the short film The Greyness of Autumn which went on to feature in a number of festivals including the Portobello Film Festival in London and the People of Passion Film Festival in Australia where the film picked up the Best Short Comedy accolade. In 2014, the company, in association with Futurist Film Ltd produced the short family film Minion Vs Minion for Vue Cinemas.

On 12 December 2014 the company's website confirmed that writing had begun on a possible sequel to The Greyness of Autumn entitled Autumn Never Dies. A crowd funding campaign was launched on Kickstarter on 17 August 2015 to raise funds for the production and lasted for 30 days. The campaign successfully raised £1,505 from 44 backers including former Gamesmaster host Dominik Diamond.

== Closure ==
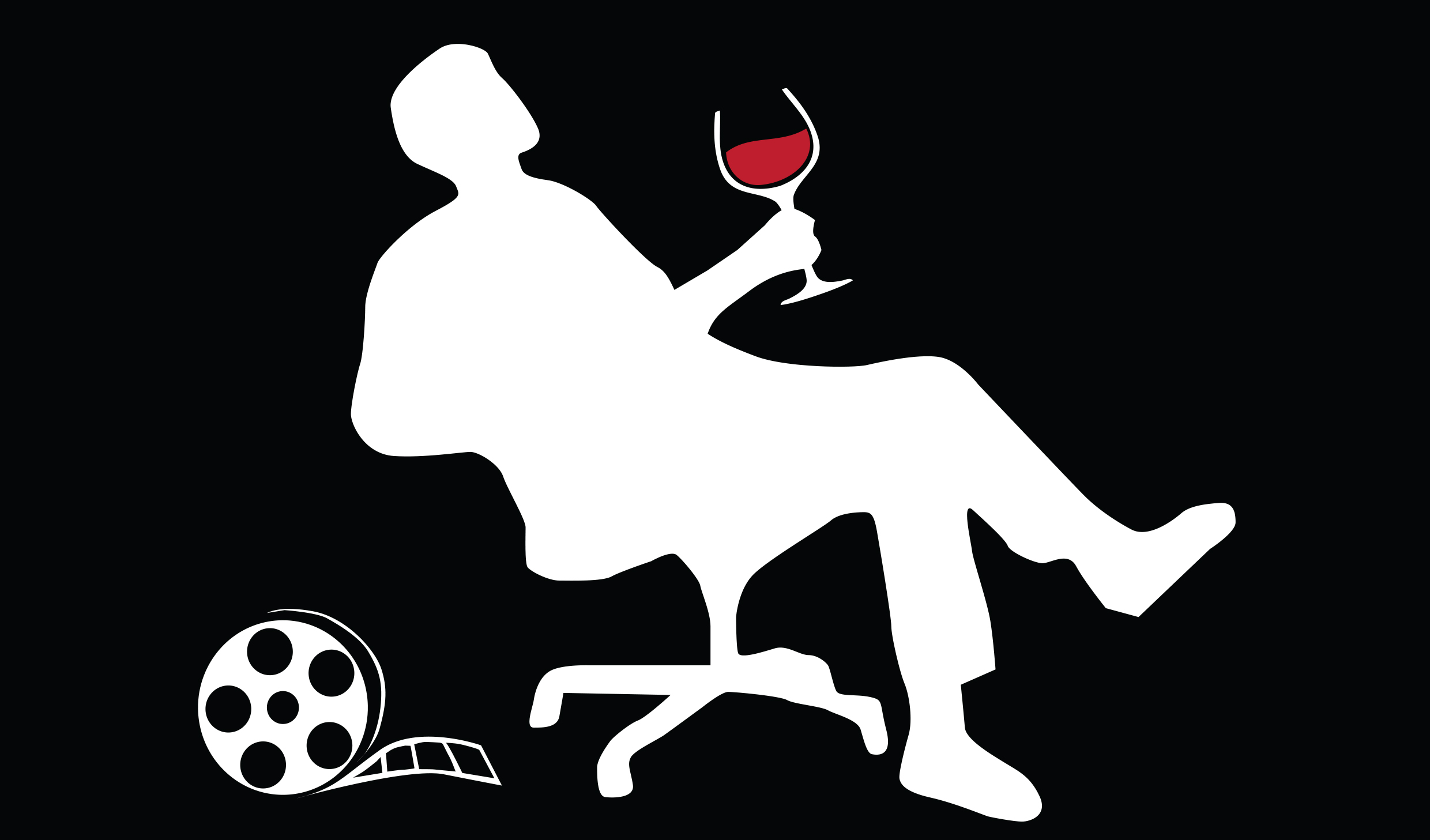
Farewell logo posted across social media when the company closed.

On 14 October 2015, Quick Off The Mark Productions announced that director Mark D. Ferguson was moving to Canada and that the company would be disbanded in the new year. Filming responsibilities for Autumn Never Dies were handed over to Pentagram Productions UK and Suited Caribou Media. After 6 years, 4 months and 10 days, the company ceased trading on 19 February 2016 and was formally dissolved by Companies House on 7 June 2016. The company's logo was changed on the final day to the running man relaxing in a chair with a glass of wine with his film reel lying on the floor. Underneath the logo it read:

"Cheers for the years, 2009 - 2016."

== Filmography ==
Year	Title	Director	Genre	Screenings	Notes
2014	Agley	Mark D. Ferguson	Drama		Short Film
2014	Minion Vs Minion	Chris Quick	Family		Collaboration Project with Futurist Film Ltd; Short Film
2012	The Greyness of Autumn	Chris Quick	Comedy; Drama	2015 Fife Independent Film Expo (United Kingdom); 2015 People of Passion Film Festival (Australia); 2014 Barossa Film Festival (Australia); 2014 Portobello Film Festival (United Kingdom); 2014 Southern Colorado Film Festival (United States); 2013 5th Base Film Exhibition (United Kingdom); 2013 Dublin Short Film & Music Festival (Ireland); 2013 Big Little Comedy Festival (United States); 2013 Ickle Film Festival (United Kingdom); 2013 Deep Fried Film Festival (United Kingdom); 2013 Loch Ness Film Festival (United Kingdom); 2013 Edinburgh Short Film Festival (United Kingdom)	Short Film
2012	Mr Cheval	Mark D. Ferguson	Comedy	2015 Manure Short Film Festival (Australia)	Short Film
2012	And Then The Dark	Gary Caldwell	Horror		Post Production Only; Collaboration Project with Tenebrous Films; Short Film
2011	In Search Of La Che	Mark D. Ferguson	Mockumentary	2014 American Online Film Awards (United States)	Feature Film
2011	The Tragic Meltdown of Pussy Ralph	Stu Russell	Drama		Short Film
2010	Butter Side Down	Keith Hennessy	Family		Collaboration Project with Bulby TV; Short Film

== Awards ==
Year	Nominated Work	Awards	Category	Result
2013	The Greyness of Autumn	British Filmmakers Alliance	Best British Film of the Month	Won
2015	The Greyness of Autumn	People of Passion Film Festival	Best Short Comedy Film	Won

== Other Productions ==
Year	Title	Notes
2014	No Blood No Sympathy	Live Event - Wrestling
2014	The Main Stay Trust	Corporate Documentary
2014	Maximum Impact 2014	Live Event - Wrestling
2014	All That Malarkey: Live at House for An Art Lover	Live Event - Music
2014	British Championship Wrestling: Live in Kilmarnock	Live Event - Wrestling
2013	Katana Contenders 2	Live Event - K-1 Kickboxing
2013	Maximum Impact 2013	Live Event - Wrestling
2013	Katana Contenders	Live Event - K-1 Kickboxing
2013	Katana 8 "Supernova"	Live Event - K-1 Kickboxing
2013	Breaking Limits 8	Live Event - Wrestling
2013	Katana 7 "Apocalypse"	Live Event - K-1 Kickboxing
2013	The Making of 'Tam O' Shanter - The Mornin Eftir	Corporate Documentary
2012	No Blood No Sympathy 10	Live Event - Wrestling
2012	Maximum Impact 2012	Live Event - Wrestling
2012	Katana 6 "Rebellion"	Live Event - K-1 Kickboxing
2012	Ardrossan Highland Games	Live Event - Sport
2012	Katana 5 "Rising Sun"	Live Event - K-1 Kickboxing
2011	The Marie Trust	Corporate Documentary
2011	Katana 4 "Bushido"	Live Event - K-1 Kickboxing
2011	Katana 3 "Warriors"	Live Event - K-1 Kickboxing
2011	Katana 2 "No Mercy"	Live Event - K-1 Kickboxing
2010	Katana 1	Live Event - K-1 Kickboxing

== See also ==
- Mark D. Ferguson
- Chris Quick
- In Search of La Che
- The Greyness of Autumn
