= Andy S. McEwan =

Scottish screenwriter and film director

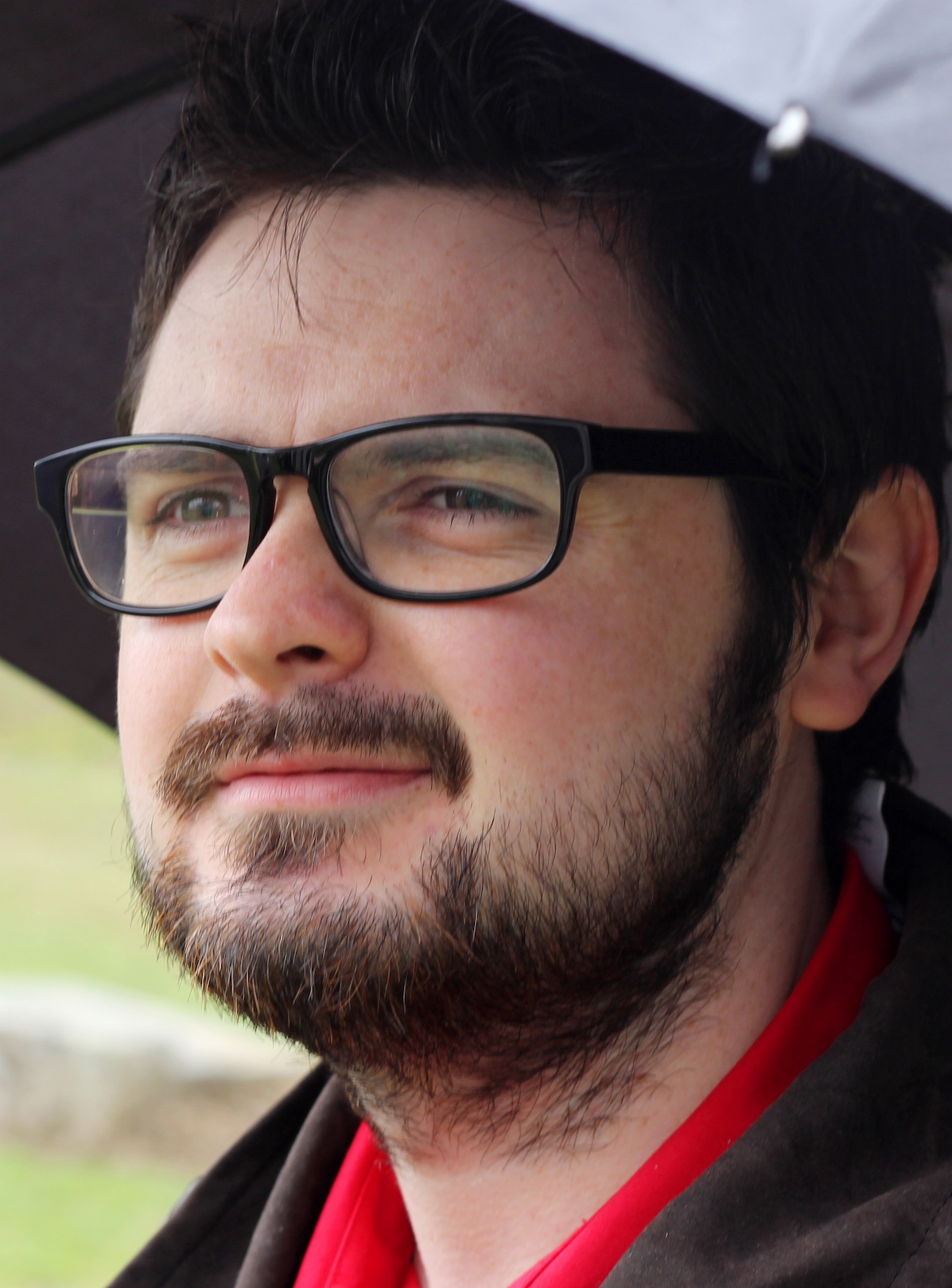
- Andy S. McEwan on the set of 'The Stranger'
- Born: 31 January 1985 (age 40); East Kilbride, Scotland
- Occupations: Screenwriter, film director
- Years active: 2009–present
- Notable work: Broken Record; The Greyness of Autumn; In Search of La Che
- Spouse: Carlyn McEwan-Crum (m. 2016; sep. 2023)

Andy S. McEwan is a Scottish screenwriter and film director.

== Life and career ==
Andy S. McEwan (born 31 January 1985) was born in East Kilbride in Scotland. After studying television production at the Glasgow Metropolitan College, he began working as a freelance screenwriter. In 2010, he teamed up with Mark D. Ferguson and Chris Quick to begin work on the feature film In Search of La Che in which he played a large part in the writing of the film. He also served as a producer, an actor and an assistant director. The film premiered at the Glasgow Film Theatre on 9 November 2011 but received mixed reviews from critics on both sides of the Atlantic. Duane Martin of Rogue Cinema said "As mockumentaries go, this one is a bit of a mixed bag. Some of the characters, and a lot of the story works quite well, but there are a couple of characters and bits of the story that either fall flat or just don’t work at all." Despite this, the film was selected to appear in the spring showcase of the 2014 American Online Film Awards.

In 2012, McEwan reunited with Chris Quick to co-write the short comedy film The Greyness of Autumn. The film followed the story of Danny McGuire, a depressed ostrich living in Glasgow. The film was well received with the films writing receiving high praise. Angie Quidim of 'That's My Entertainment' said "The comedic genius of the dialog from both Chris Quick and Andy S. McEwan address the social commentary about the human condition and the power of perception. Despite its low budget feel, the laughs contained in the dialog will only have you wanting more." Mark Bell of Film Threat in the United States said "How can you not enjoy lines like 'can his precious hands pleasure you in the way my beak can?' as delivered by an angry ostrich puppet?"

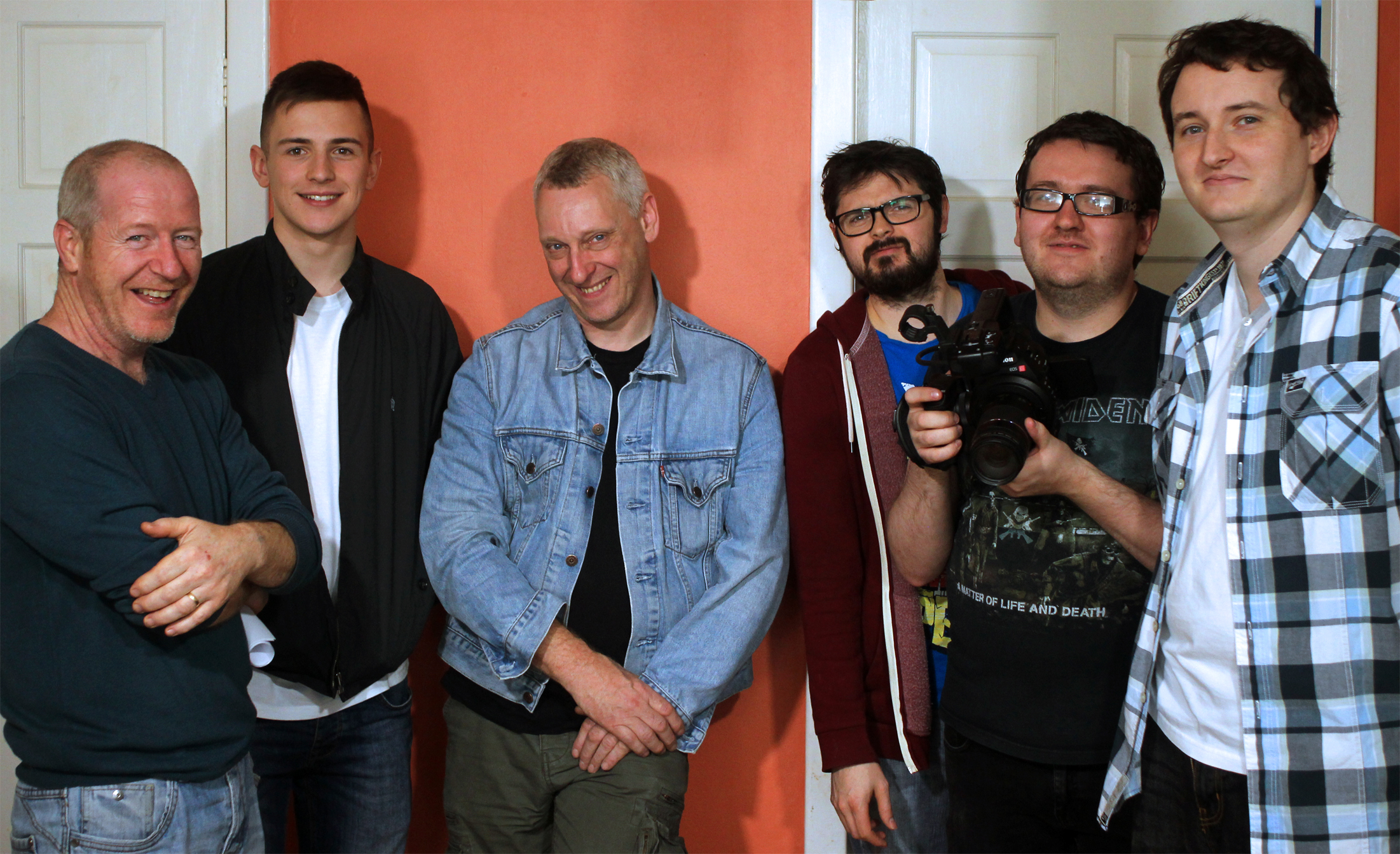
Cast and crew of Broken Record. (L-R) John Gaffney, Darren McColl, Steven Patrick, Andy S.McEwan, Paul Michael Egan, Chris Quick

2014 marked the directorial debut for McEwan when he directed the short film Broken Record which he wrote himself. Shot predominately in East Kilbride the film tells the story of Frasier and Tam, a couple of house clearance workers who stumble upon an old trunk full of old records. Convinced they have discovered a small treasure, the pair hatch a plan to steal the records and sell them to the highest bidder. The film was well received and was selected to appear in the 2014 edition of the Portobello Film Festival in London. Mark Bell of Film Threat wrote:

"Andy S. McEwan’s short film, Broken Record, gives us a delightfully crooked tale of a couple of knuckleheads thinking they’ve turned into criminal masterminds. While the film stays away from the madcap absurdist route, it’s nevertheless humorous to watch what happens when the dreams of treasure blind the duo to the reality of the situation; a reality that will have the final, cruel laugh."

In June, the film screened at the monthly Write Shoot Cut event in Edinburgh with McEwan taking part in a Q&A session alongside Chris Quick and Paul Michael Egan.

He is currently filming Autumn Never Dies, the sequel to his earlier film The Greyness of Autumn.

== Filmography ==
Year	Film	Credited as					Notes
Year	Film	Director	Producer	Writer	Actor	Role	Notes
2010	Little Green Bag				Yes	Pirate	
2011	The Tragic Meltdown of Pussy Ralph				Yes	Towel Boy	
2011	In Search of La Che		Yes	Yes	Yes	Lewis / Protester / Rioter / Blitzkrieg Follower; Nelson Sheffield / Whippy	Assistant Director
2012	Mr Cheval		Yes	Yes	Yes	Mr Cheval	
2012	Iustitia				Yes	Andy Junkie	
2012	The Greyness of Autumn		Yes	Yes	Yes	Office Worker	
2013	The Stranger				Yes	The Stranger	
2013	Such a Nice Guy				Yes	Nice Guy	
2013	Hero Ade				Yes	Iron Man	
2014	The Package				Yes	Delivery Driver	
2014	Broken Record	Yes	Yes	Yes			Directorial Debut
2014	Piracy				Yes	Harvey the film critic	
2014	Identity				Yes	Melvin / Nedhunter	
2014	Coalition	Yes	Yes	Yes	Yes	The Man	
2015	Stevie and Mike			Yes			
2015	Flux				Yes	Sam / Edworth 'Wild Beard' Kidd	
2015	Broadfoot's Magical Adventure		Yes	Yes	Yes	Carjacked Man	
2020	Autumn Never Dies		Yes	Yes		Yakob / Homeless Man / Judge Shark	
2024	Shortbread	Yes	Yes	Yes	Yes	Paul	

== Awards ==
Year	Nominated Work	Awards	Category	Result
2013	The Greyness of Autumn	British Filmmakers Alliance	Best British Film of the Month (Shared with Chris Quick and Mark D. Ferguson)	Won
2015	The Greyness of Autumn	People of Passion Film Festival	Best Short Comedy Film (Shared with Chris Quick and Mark D. Ferguson)	Won
2016	Broadfoot's Magical Adventure	The Scottish Short Film Festival	Best Costume	Won
2016	Broadfoot's Magical Adventure	Los Angeles Film Awards	Honorable Mention: Dark Comedy (Shared with Mark D. Ferguson and Chris Quick, Euan Bennet, Steven Patrick, Michael Cooke, Ashley Ford, Andy Clark and Jennifer Gemmell)	Won
2020	Autumn Never Dies	Top Indie Film Awards	Best Short (Shared with Chris Quick)	Won
2020	Autumn Never Dies	Top Indie Film Awards	Best Humour (Shared with Chris Quick)	Won
2020	Autumn Never Dies	Top Indie Film Awards	Best Writing (Shared with Chris Quick)	Nominated
2020	Autumn Never Dies	Top Indie Film Awards	Best Original Idea (Shared with Chris Quick)	Nominated
2020	Autumn Never Dies	Swindon Independent Film Festival	Best Comedy (Shared with Chris Quick)	Nominated
2020	Autumn Never Dies	The Scottish Short Film Festival	Best Script (Shared with Chris Quick)	Won
2020	Autumn Never Dies	Wales International Film Festival	Best Short Comedy (Shared with Chris Quick)	Nominated
2020	Autumn Never Dies	Wales International Film Festival	Jury's Special Prize: Short Comedy (Shared with Chris Quick)	Won
2020	Autumn Never Dies	US Hollywood International Golden Film Awards	Best Foreign Film (Shared with Chris Quick)	Nominated
2021	Autumn Never Dies	Twin Tiers International Film Festival	Best Comedy Short (Shared with Chris Quick)	Nominated
2021	Autumn Never Dies	Indy Film Library Awards	Special Commendation: Screenplay (Shared with Chris Quick)	Won
2021	Autumn Never Dies	Unrestricted View Film Festival	Best Long Short Film (Shared with Chris Quick)	Nominated
2021	Autumn Never Dies	Queen Palm Film Festival	Best Writer - Short Film (Shared with Chris Quick)	Nominated
2021	Autumn Never Dies	The Romford Film Festival	Best Short Film (Shared with Chris Quick)	Nominated
2021	Autumn Never Dies	The Romford Film Festival	Jury Prize (Shared with Chris Quick)	Won
2021	Autumn Never Dies	Reel Comedy Fest	Best Screenplay (Shared with Chris Quick)	Won
2021	Autumn Never Dies	Southern Shorts Awards	Best Puppetry (Shared with Chris Quick)	Won
2021	Autumn Never Dies	The HB Film Festival	Best Comedy (Shared with Chris Quick)	Nominated
2021	Autumn Never Dies	Underground Cinema	Best International Short Film (Shared with Chris Quick)	Nominated
2021	Autumn Never Dies	FFTG Awards	Best Writer (Shared with Chris Quick)	Won
2022	Autumn Never Dies	Scotland International Festival of Cinema	Best Screenplay Featurette (Shared with Chris Quick)	Nominated
2022	Autumn Never Dies	Scotland International Festival of Cinema	Best Ensemble Cast in a Featurette (Shared with All Cast)	Nominated
2022	Autumn Never Dies	Scotland International Festival of Cinema	Indie Spirit Award (Shared with Chris Quick)	Won
