= Chris Martin (Scottish actor) =

Scottish actor and writer

- Born: 28 October 1980 (age 45); Glasgow, Scotland
- Education: University of the West of Scotland
- Occupation: Actor / Writer
- Years active: 2014–present
- Notable work: River City; Autumn Never Dies; Open Mike; Regrets

Chris Martin is a Scottish actor and writer. He is best known for the role of Paul Brennan in River City and as Michael in Open Mike in which he was nominated for the Best Actor accolade at the 2016 British Academy Scotland New Talent Awards. He also appeared as Callaghan in the short film Autumn Never Dies.

Chris’ writing credits include Open Mike and Regrets with his third short film in pre-production as well as collaborating on several other forthcoming projects including a documentary based around Muay Thai.

== Filmography ==
Year	Film	Role	Director(s)	Notes
2014	K'Nibble	Newscaster	Andrew Dobbie	Short Film
2014	Bye	Dr. James Main	Andrew Dobbie; Tobias Erdmann	Short Film
2015	Open Mike	Michael	Tobias Erdmann	Short Film
2015	Flux	Marko / Highlander	Antony Scott	Feature Film
2016	River City	Paul Brennan	Jim Shields	TV series
2017	Devourer	Jack	Ricky Hughes	Short Film
2018	Regrets	N/A	AJ Sykes	Producer / Writer
2020	Autumn Never Dies	Agent Johnson	Chris Quick	Short Film

== Awards and nominations ==
Year	Nominated Work	Award	Category	Result
2016	Open Mike	British Academy Scotland New Talent Awards	Best Actor	Nominated
2016	Open Mike	Portsmouth International Film Festival	Best Actor	Won
2022	Autumn Never Dies	Scotland International Festival of Cinema	Best Ensemble Cast in a Featurette (Shared with All Cast)	Nominated
