= Suited Caribou Media =

Post-production company based in Glasgow, Scotland

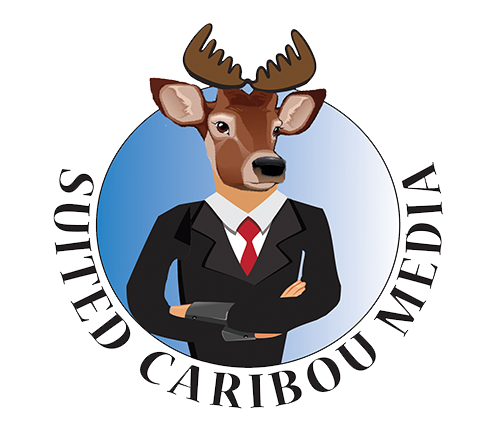
- Industry: Post production
- Founded: 30 June 2015
- Founder: Chris Quick
- Headquarters: Glasgow, Scotland
- Products: Offline editing Online editing Motion pictures Photography
- Website: Company website

Suited Caribou Media is a post-production company based in Glasgow, Scotland.

== History ==
Suited Caribou Media was launched on 30 June 2015 by Scottish film editor Chris Quick as an umbrella company to represent his freelance following the closure of Quick Off The Mark Productions.

In February 2016, it was given the joint task of taking over as production company for Autumn Never Dies alongside Pentagram Productions UK. On 3 April 2016, the company made its first announcement about the project when it published the cast line up for the film.

The company is possibly best known for its post-production work on Electric Faces which received a Best Writer nomination at the 2016 British Academy Scotland New Talent Awards for director Johnny Herbin. Writing for MovieScramble, John McArthur said:

"The film has a score for the entire eleven minute run time. The electronic soundscape work in tandem with the editing from Chris Quick to heighten the tension at the required moments without it being too obvious."

The spoilist website also added:

"Every frame has clearly been meticulously plan with the editing perfectly creating a heartbeat to the story as it builds to its conclusion.

In March 2016, photography work by Suited Caribou Media was printed in Digital Filmmaker Magazine in the United Kingdom. The six-page article about the short film Fanatic featured various photographs taken during production of cast and crew. On 18 June 2016, The National newspaper in Scotland also printed pictures from the companies collection in an article about the shows appearance at the 2016 television festival SeriesFest in Denver, USA.

== Filmography ==
Year	Title	Director	Genre	Production	Post Production
2015	Electric Faces	Johnny Herbin	Sci-Fi; Crime	No	Yes
2015	Fish Supper	Ray Crofter	Drama	No	Yes
2015	Mary's House	Steven Patrick	Drama / Mystery	No	Yes
2015	Dog Dayz	Madelyn Dwyer	Comedy	No	Yes
2018	Mountain	Johnny Herbin	War	No	Yes
2020	Autumn Never Dies	Chris Quick	Comedy	Yes	Yes
2023	Care & Repair	Michael Cooke	Comedy	No	Yes
2024	Shortbread	Andy S. McEwan	Comedy	No	Yes
2024	Cakes!	Johnny Herbin	Musical	No	Yes
2024	Curiosity	Michael Cooke	Horror	No	Yes
2024	The Fartist	Steve Johnson	Comedy	No	Yes
2024	Sealgair	Steve Johnson	Thriller	No	Yes

== See also ==
- Chris Quick
- Quick Off The Mark Productions
