= Darren Connell (comedian) =

Scottish stand-up comedian, podcaster and actor

- Born: 11 October 1987 (age 38); Glasgow, Scotland
- Occupations: comedian, actor
- Years active: 2014–present

Darren Connell is a Scottish stand-up comedian, podcaster and actor. He is possibly best known for playing the role of Bobby Muir in the television series Scot Squad.

== Life and career ==
Connell grew up in Springburn in Glasgow. He started performing stand up gigs whilst juggling a full-time job at a supermarket until fellow comedian Kevin Bridges convinced him to quit and do comedy full time. Since then, Connell has gone on to host many solo shows across the UK including an appearance at the 2016 Edinburgh Fringe Festival. Writing about his show No Filter, Jay Richardson of Chortle wrote:

"His off-stage naivety, which he channels into Bobby, makes Connell extremely likeable, as does his easy rapport with his audience and chunky, rather sadsack quality, extending him the credit for an occasional, more calculated, dark gag. Even if there aren't enough stories in this show yet, you trust in his accident-prone nature to deliver them soon."

In 2019, his show, Abandon All Hope played to a sell out audience at the 2019 edition of the Glasgow Comedy Festival.

Despite having very little acting experience, Connell was cast as Bobby in the BBC Scotland mockumentary series Scot Squad. The role earned him a best actor nomination at the 2015 British Academy Scotland New Talent Awards.

As of early 2019, he hosted the podcast The Darren Connell Show on Glasgow Live, which has featured guest appearances from Grado, Loki and Greg Hemphill.

In September 2021, he launched the podcast Straight White Whale with producer and co-host Paul Shields.

== Filmography ==
=== Television ===
Year	Film	Director(s)	Character
2014 – present	Scot Squad	Iain Davidson	Bobby Muir
2017	The Glasgow Trip	Jacob Bendod	Customer
2017	Trust Me	Amy Neil	Paul Longhurst

=== Film ===
Year	Film	Director(s)	Character
2020	Autumn Never Dies	Chris Quick	Alky Crow (voice)

== Awards and nominations ==
Year	Nominated Work	Award	Category	Result
2015	Scot Squad	British Academy Scotland New Talent Awards	Best Actor	Nominated
2022	Autumn Never Dies	Scotland International Festival of Cinema	Best Ensemble Cast in a Featurette (Shared with All Cast)	Nominated
