= Chris Quick =

Scottish filmmaker (born 1988)

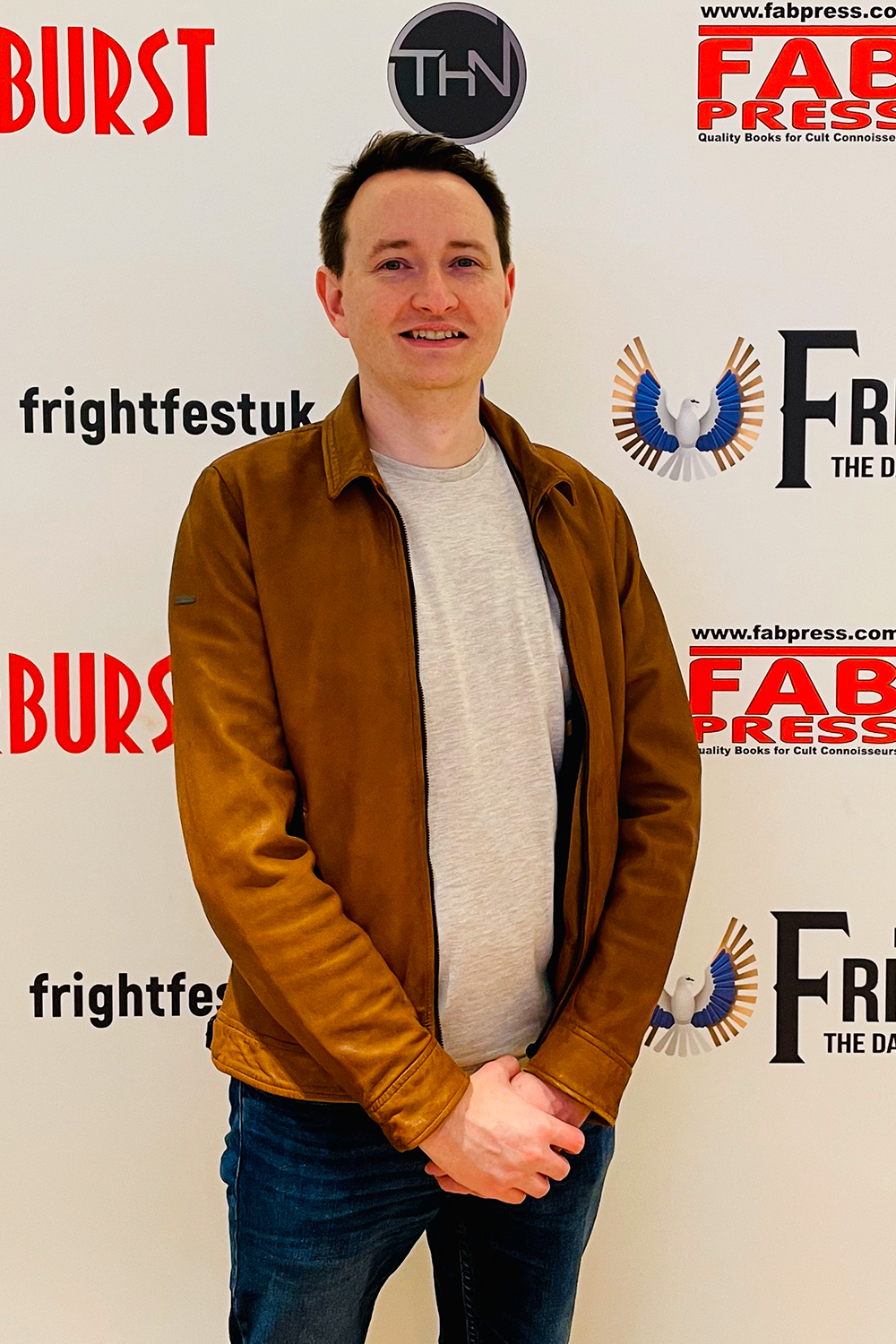
- Quick at Frightfest in 2024

Director of the Glasgow Filmmakers Alliance
- Incumbent
- Assumed office 1 July 2019
- Deputy: Gary McLellan
- Preceded by: Andrew O'Donnell

Deputy Director of the Glasgow Filmmakers Alliance
- In office 31 October 2011 – 30 June 2019
- Director: Andrew O'Donnell
- Preceded by: Position established
- Succeeded by: Gary McLellan

Personal details
- Born: 2 August 1988 (age 38) Glasgow, Scotland
- Party: Labour Party (2011–2015)
- Occupation: Film editor, film producer
- Known for: Autumn Never Dies; Mountain; The Greyness of Autumn; In Search of La Che
- Website: Official website

Chris Quick (born 2 August 1988) is a Scottish editor and producer of independent films. His editing credits includes Autumn Never Dies, In Search of La Che, Mountain and The Greyness of Autumn, which was his directorial debut. In July 2019, he became the director of the Glasgow Filmmakers Alliance.

== Career ==
=== Quick Off The Mark Productions (2009 to 2016) ===
Originally starting in theatre, Quick made the move to video editing in 2007 when he studied television production at the Glasgow Metropolitan College (now City of Glasgow College). There, he met Mark D. Ferguson and Andy S. McEwan and formed a close working relationship with the pair.

After graduating in 2009, he co-founded Quick Off The Mark Productions with Ferguson and began working in corporate advertising videos. In 2010, the pair were reunited with McEwan when they began development of what would become their first feature film, In Search of La Che. Starring Duncan Airlie James in his first leading role as an actor, the mockumentary follows John Tavish on his quest to track down fictional rock star Roxy La Che. English actor Steve Nallon also made a guest appearance in the film as former British Prime Minister Margaret Thatcher. The film premiered at the Glasgow Film Theatre on 9 November 2011 with the cast and crew in attendance as well as an unexpected appearance form Scottish actor Peter Mullan.

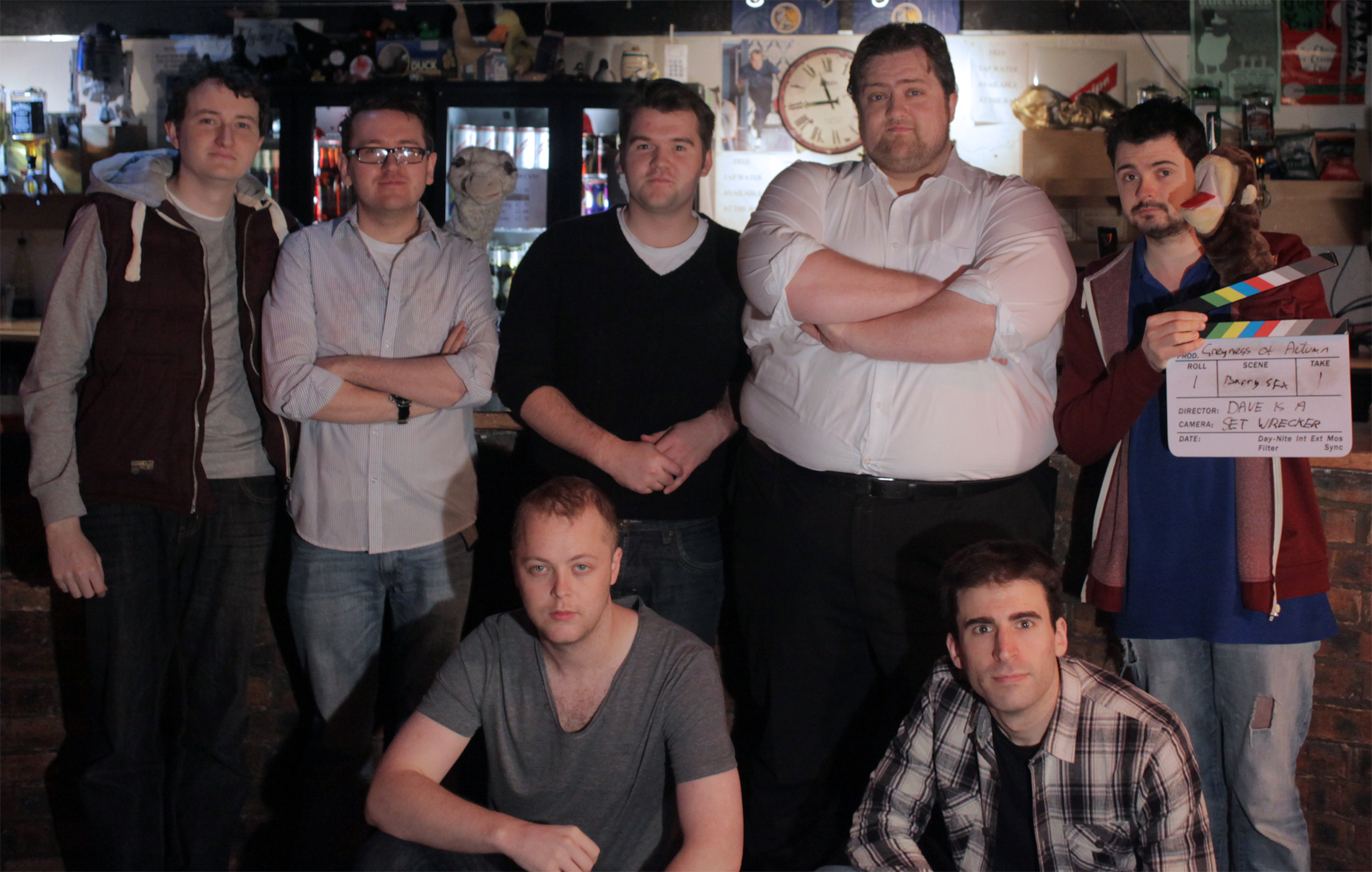
Cast and crew of The Greyness of Autumn. Top, L-R: Chris Quick, Paul Michael Egan, Andrew O'Donnell, Neil Francis, Andy S. McEwan. Bottom, L-R: David Craig, Mark D. Ferguson.

In 2012, Quick made his directorial debut with the short comedy The Greyness of Autumn, which he co-wrote with McEwan. The film, starring Duncan Airlie James again in the lead role, follows the story of Danny McGuire, a depressed ostrich living in Glasgow. The film received good reviews upon its release in both the United Kingdom and abroad. Canadian review site Pretty Clever Films wrote:

"Quick is alarmingly funny. The film serves up a copious amount of black comedy that has a great WTF-factor. The film is intriguing simply because it's so strange."

Throughout 2013, The Greyness of Autumn appeared at festivals in the United Kingdom including the Edinburgh Short Film Festival and Deep Fried Film Festival. It was screened in various countries including the United States, where it featured in the Big Little Comedy Festival. It was also shown at the Dublin Short Film & Music Festival in Ireland. In 2014, The Greyness of Autumn made an unexpected return to the festival circuit in 2014, appearing in the Southern Colorado Film Festival and Portobello Film Festival. In the same month, the film also made an appearance at the Barossa Film Festival in Australia after narrowly missing out in the selection process for the 2013 edition. 2015 saw the film return to Australia, when it received the Best Short Comedy accolade at the People of Passion film festival.

Quick returned to the director's chair in 2014 to direct a short children's film for a competition run by Vue Cinemas. The competition involved filmmakers from Glasgow creating three films from scripts written by children at a local school. The project was led by Steve Johnson of Futurist Films, with Quick directing the short film Minion Vs Minion and Matthew Cowan of Production Attic Ltd directing Princess Butterfly and Arianna.

After nearly seven years in business, it was announced on 14 October 2015 that Quick Off The Mark Productions would be closing due to Ferguson's decision to move to Canada. The company ceased trading on 19 February 2016 and was formally closed by Companies House on 7 June 2016.

=== Freelance career (2013–present) ===
In 2013, Quick began working outside of Quick Off The Mark Productions for the first time. He edited the short film Sectarian Secret Police for Partickular Films in Glasgow. The film, directed by Joseph Andrew Mclean, was shown alongside The Greyness of Autumn at the Loch Ness Film Festival in July 2013.

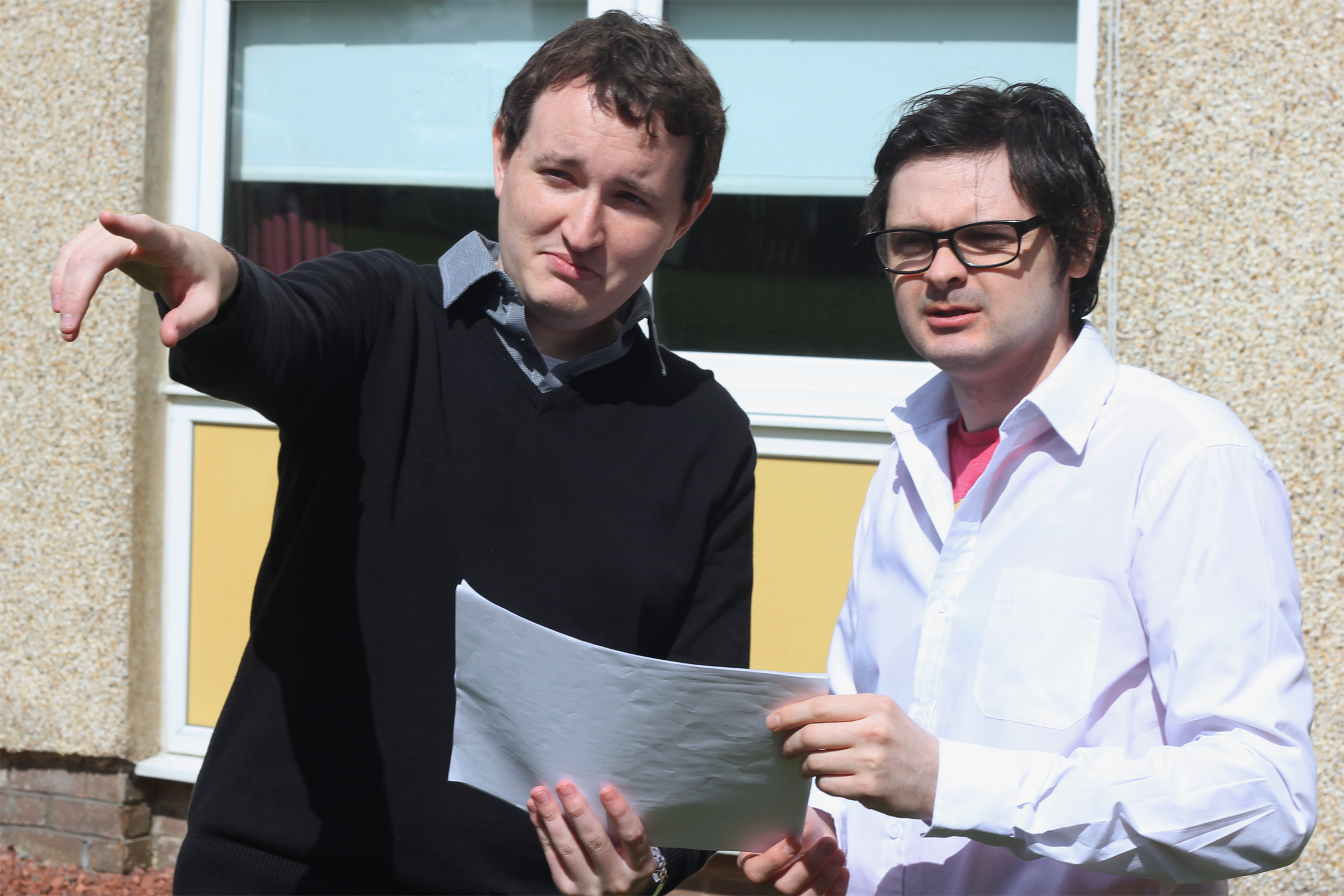
Quick with Andy S. McEwan on the set of Broken Record

In 2014, Quick was involved in two short films simultaneously. January saw filming begin on Glory Hunter. At the same time, he was piecing together the final edit of Broken Record, the directorial debut of Andy S. McEwan. Broken Record appeared at various film festivals, including the Portobello Film Festival in London.

Throughout 2014, he worked on the short sci-fi film Electric Faces, directed by Johnny Herbin. Quick was brought on board to produce the film, and was later offered the task of editing the film as well. The film tells the story of a recovering addict's plan to commit the perfect robbery which is thrown into chaos by a cantankerous bank guard and an increasingly unstable robot. Quick expressed his admiration for the work done by the cast and crew. He praised lead actor Euan Bennet for taking on a mammoth task so early in his acting training, and director of photography Darren Eggenschwiler for his expert knowledge in the field of cinematography. He stated that Johnny Herbin had "the makings of a great director." Herbin received a Best Writer nomination at the 2016 British Academy Scotland New Talent Awards.

When Quick Off The Mark Productions disbanded in 2016, Quick launched Suited Caribou Media, providing post-production and photography services to independent films across Scotland. His photography has appeared in the UK print publication Digital Filmmaker Magazine.

In 2017, Quick again teamed up with Johnny Herbin to work on the short war film Mountain. It was released in 2018 and earned Quick his first award for editing at the 2018 Dublin Independent Film Festival. He was later nominated three more times for Best Editor.

Quick's next big project was the sequel to The Greyness of Autumn. The film took many years to accomplish, with talks with Andy S. McEwan about a possible script starting in early 2014. In 2015, a script was finally agreed upon. A crowdfunding campaign raised £1,505 from 44 backers including former GamesMaster host Dominik Diamond. Filming began in 2016 with Steve Johnson as director of photography. The film was heavily delayed in post-production, but was released on World Puppetry Day in 2020. The film opened to positive reviews, with many praising its script and direction. Jolly Moel of Screen Critix wrote:

"Chris Quick directs the film simply with no bells, whistles or effects but he certainly knows how to direct a comedy."

The film received 29 award nominations, winning 16, making it Quick's most successful project. It landed him his first nomination for directing, from the Laugh or Die Comedy festival in the United States. At the Romford Film Festival, the film received commendation from the organisers, with festival director Spencer Hawken saying:

"I have not laughed so much in such a long time. This is a really really ridiculously funny film."

In an interview at the Unrestricted View Film Festival, Quick hinted that a possible television show based on Autumn Never Dies was being explored, and that Channel 4 was being targeted as a potential host for the series.

Quick returned in 2023 to produce and edit Care and Repair for his Autumn Never Dies co-star Michael Cooke, and later did the same for Cooke's second film, Curiosity. He also edited the short film Shortbread for Andy S. McEwan.

In 2024, Quick reunited with Johnny Herbin to produce and edit the short film Cakes!, which screened at the 2024 editions of FrightFest in London, Beyond Fest in Los Angeles and Motelx: Festival Internacional de Cinema de Terror de Lisboa in Portugal, where it was nominated for Best European Short.

== Glasgow Filmmakers Alliance ==
Quick co-founded the Glasgow Filmmakers Alliance with actor Andrew O'Donnell in October 2011. The non-profit organisation hosts an online database with the details of film industry professionals and companies operating in and around the city of Glasgow.

A supporter of independent film, Quick led a campaign to have the British Academy Scotland New Talent Awards recognised by IMDb, stating that "they represented the best of emerging Scottish talent". The campaign was successful, and the awards were introduced to the site later that year. He repeated this success with the inclusion of the Virgin Media Short Awards after the first double win by Scottish director John McPhail with his film Just Say Hi.

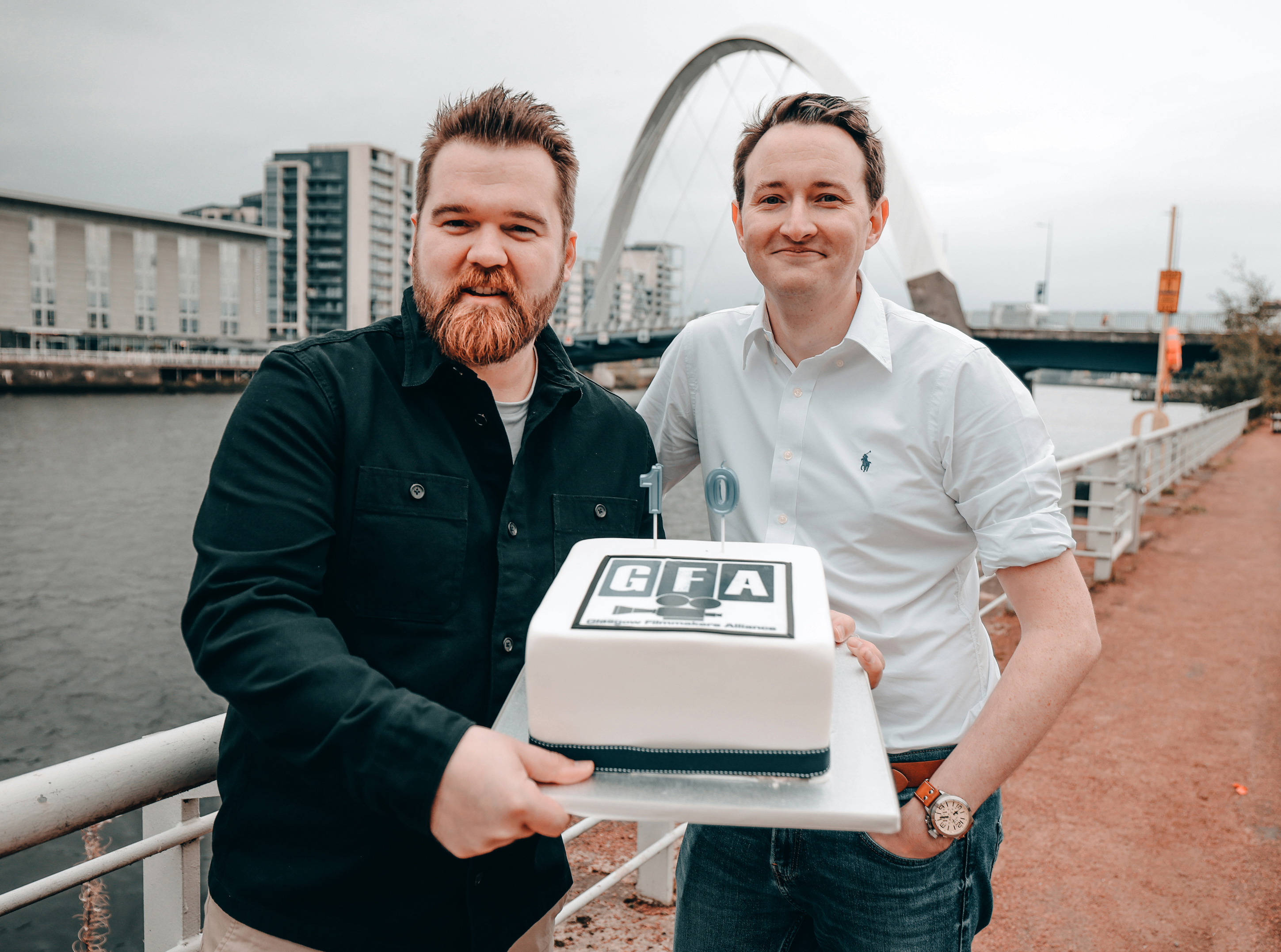
Quick reunited with Andrew O'Donnell in October 2021 to celebrate the 10th anniversary of the Glasgow Filmmakers Alliance.

In 2014, Quick and O'Donnell wrote an open letter on behalf of the independent filmmakers of Glasgow to the director of BAFTA Scotland, Jude MacLaverty. They asked the film body to include three new awards at the annual ceremony aimed at low-budget and independent filmmakers. On 28 October it was announced that the proposal would be placed on the agenda of the next Bafta Scotland Committee meeting in December 2014.

On 2 April 2015, the BAFTA Scotland committee released their response to the proposals put forward by the Glasgow Filmmakers Alliance.

In March 2017, Quick, along with other industry professionals, signed an open letter to the Arts Council, England, objecting to the organisation's decision not to renew the visa of American-born actor Tyler Collins.

On 25 April 2019, O'Donnell announced that he would be standing down as director of the Glasgow Filmmakers Alliance. In May, it was announced that Quick would take his place as director, with Gary McLellan taking over as deputy director.

== Personal life ==
Quick became a member of BAFTA Scotland in 2012.

He was a member of the British Labour Party from July 2011 to March 2015.

Together with Andy S. McEwan, he considered bidding to represent the United Kingdom at the 2014 Eurovision Song Contest as the puppet Nelson from The Greyness of Autumn.

He joined the Guild of British Film and Television Editors in December 2017.

Quick revealed on 23 May 2018 that he is gay. On 8 July 2026, he proposed to his partner Ryan at the top of the Wiener Riesenrad.

== Filmography ==
Year	Film	Credited as				Additional roles	Notes
Year	Film	Director	Film editor	Producer	Screenwriter	Additional roles	Notes
2009	Kilt Man		Yes				
2011	The Tragic Meltdown of Pussy Ralph		Yes				
2011	In Search of La Che		Yes	Yes	Yes	Actor – Wermit (voice); Puppeteer; Stills photographer	
2012	Mr Cheval		Yes	Yes	Yes	Stills photographer	
2012	And Then the Dark		Yes				
2012	The Greyness of Autumn	Yes	Yes	Yes	Yes	Actor – Nelson (voice); Puppeteer; Stills photographer	Directorial debut
2013	Such a Nice Guy			Yes		Actor – Employee	Associate producer
2013	Sectarian Secret Police		Yes				
2013	Dragoon			Yes			Executive producer
2013	Utopia: The Temple of Paradise		Yes				
2014	The Package			Yes			Associate producer
2014	Glory Hunter		Yes			Actor – Santana's Manager	
2014	Broken Record		Yes	Yes		Actor – Radio Announcer (voice); Stills photographer	
2014	Piracy					Stills photographer	
2014	Minion Vs Minion	Yes		Yes		Post-production advisor Puppeteer	Associate producer
2014	Passing Place					Stills photographer	
2014	Coalition	Yes	Yes	Yes	Yes		Co-director
2015	Fish Supper		Yes				
2015	Fanatic					Stills photographer Production assistant	
2015	Mary's House		Yes			Actor – The Boss	
2015	Devourer					Stills photographer	
2015	Dog Dayz		Yes			Stills photographer	
2015	Electric Faces		Yes	Yes		Stills photographer	
2015	Broadfoot's Magical Adventure		Yes	Yes	Yes		
2016	Miriam					Stills photographer	
2016	Round Habbit					Stills photographer	
2016	Flux					Stills photographer Assembly editor	
2018	Mountain		Yes	Yes		Stills photographer	
2019	Mia: A Rapture 2.0 Production					Stills photographer	
2020	Autumn Never Dies	Yes	Yes	Yes	Yes	Nelson (voice); Puppeteer	
2021	Custodian					Stills photographer	
2022	Imposter Syndrome					Assistant director	
2023	Care and Repair		Yes	Yes		Assistant director	
2024	Shortbread		Yes				
2024	Cakes!		Yes	Yes			
2024	Curiosity		Yes	Yes		Assistant director	
2024	The Fartist		Yes				
2024	Sealgair		Yes				
2025	Up/Down		Yes	Yes		Assistant director	

== Awards ==
Year	Nominated work	Awards	Category	Result
2015	The Greyness of Autumn	People of Passion Film Festival	Best Short Comedy Film (shared with Mark D. Ferguson and Andy S. McEwan)	Won
2016	Broadfoot's Magical Adventure	Los Angeles Film Awards	Honorable Mention: Dark Comedy (shared with Mark D. Ferguson and Andy S. McEwan, Euan Bennet, Steven Patrick, Michael Cooke, Ashley Ford, Andy Clark and Jennifer Gemmell)	Won
2017	Electric Faces	Festigious International Film Festival	Best Short (shared with Johnny Herbin)	Won
2018	Mountain	Feel The Reel International Film Festival	Best Editor	Nominated
2018	Mountain	Dublin Independent Film Festival	Best Editor	Won
2018	Mountain	Queen Palm International Film Festival	Best Editor	Nominated
2018	Mountain	Festival of Time	Best Editor	Nominated
2019	Mountain	I See You Awards	Best Editor	Nominated
2020	Autumn Never Dies	Top Indie Film Awards	Best Editor	Won
2020	Autumn Never Dies	Top Indie Film Awards	Best Short (shared with Andy S. McEwan)	Won
2020	Autumn Never Dies	Top Indie Film Awards	Best Humour (shared with Andy S. McEwan)	Won
2020	Autumn Never Dies	Top Indie Film Awards	Best Director	Nominated
2020	Autumn Never Dies	Top Indie Film Awards	Best Writing (shared with Andy S. McEwan)	Nominated
2020	Autumn Never Dies	Top Indie Film Awards	Best Original Idea (shared with Andy S. McEwan)	Nominated
2020	Autumn Never Dies	Alternative Film Festival	Best Long Short Film	Won
2020	Autumn Never Dies	Swindon Independent Film Festival	Best Comedy (shared with Andy S. McEwan)	Nominated
2020	Autumn Never Dies	The Scottish Short Film Festival	Best Script (shared with Andy S. McEwan)	Won
2020	Autumn Never Dies	Portobello Film Festival	Best Comedy	Nominated
2020	Autumn Never Dies	Wales International Film Festival	Best Short Comedy (shared with Andy S. McEwan)	Nominated
2020	Autumn Never Dies	Wales International Film Festival	Jury's Special Prize: Short Comedy (shared with Andy S. McEwan)	Won
2020	Autumn Never Dies	Dublin International Short Film & Music Festival	Best Comedy	Nominated
2020	Autumn Never Dies	US Hollywood International Golden Film Awards	Best Foreign Film (shared with Andy S. McEwan)	Nominated
2021	Autumn Never Dies	European Cinematography Awards	Best Comedy Film	Won
2021	Autumn Never Dies	Twin Tiers International Film Festival	Best Comedy Short (shared with Andy S. McEwan)	Nominated
2021	Autumn Never Dies	Indy Film Library Awards	Special Commendation: Screenplay (shared with Andy S. McEwan)	Won
2021	Autumn Never Dies	Laugh or Die Comedy Film Festival	Best Director	Nominated
2021	Autumn Never Dies	Unrestricted View Film Festival	Best Long Short Film (shared with Andy S. McEwan)	Nominated
2021	Autumn Never Dies	Queen Palm Film Festival	Best Supporting Actor - Short Film (Silver Award)	Won
2021	Autumn Never Dies	Queen Palm Film Festival	Best Writer - Short Film (shared with Andy S. McEwan)	Nominated
2021	Autumn Never Dies	The Romford Film Festival	Best Short Film (shared with Andy S. McEwan)	Nominated
2021	Autumn Never Dies	The Romford Film Festival	Jury Prize (shared with Andy S. McEwan)	Won
2021	Autumn Never Dies	Reel Comedy Fest	Best Screenplay (shared with Andy S. McEwan)	Won
2021	Autumn Never Dies	Southern Shorts Awards	Best Puppetry (shared with Andy S. McEwan)	Won
2021	Autumn Never Dies	The HB Film Festival	Best Comedy (shared with Andy S. McEwan)	Nominated
2021	Autumn Never Dies	Underground Cinema	Best International Short Film (shared with Andy S. McEwan)	Nominated
2021	Autumn Never Dies	FFTG Awards	Best Supporting Actor	Nominated
2021	Autumn Never Dies	FFTG Awards	Best Writer (shared with Andy S. McEwan)	Won
2022	Autumn Never Dies	Scotland International Festival of Cinema	Best Director	Nominated
2022	Autumn Never Dies	Scotland International Festival of Cinema	Best Screenplay Featurette (shared with Andy S. McEwan)	Nominated
2022	Autumn Never Dies	Scotland International Festival of Cinema	Best Ensemble Cast in a Featurette (shared with All Cast)	Nominated
2022	Autumn Never Dies	Scotland International Festival of Cinema	Indie Spirit Award (shared with Andy S. McEwan)	Won
2024	Cakes!	Swindon Independent Film Festival	Best Post Production (shared with Johnny Herbin & Oliver Lodge)	Won

Media offices
Preceded by Andrew O'Donnell	Director; Glasgow Filmmakers Alliance; 2019–present	Succeeded by Incumbent
Preceded by Office established	Deputy Director; Glasgow Filmmakers Alliance; 2011–2019	Succeeded by Gary McLellan
