= Mark D. Ferguson =

- Born: 13 June 1986 (age 39); Glasgow, Scotland
- Occupations: Film director, film producer
- Years active: 2009–present
- Notable work: Agley; The Greyness of Autumn; In Search of La Che

Mark D. Ferguson is a Scottish film director, screenwriter and camera operator. He is possibly best known for his directorial and camera work on the feature film In Search of La Che.

== Biography ==
Ferguson studied Television Production at the Glasgow Metropolitan College. After graduating, he co founded the production company Quick Off The Mark Productions with Chris Quick. In 2010, the pair teams up with Andy S. McEwan to write and produce their first feature film In Search of La Che which starred Duncan Airlie James in the leading role of John Tavish. The film premiered at the Glasgow Film Theatre on 9 November 2011. The film received mixed reviews from critics on both sides of the Atlantic. Duane Martin of Rogue Cinema said "As mockumentaries go, this one is a bit of a mixed bag. Some of the characters, and a lot of the story works quite well, but there are a couple of characters and bits of the story that either fall flat or just don't work at all." Nicholas Rapp of 'The Movie Banter' said "What director Mark D. Ferguson and Andy S. McEwan got right was the element of insecurity within the documentary style. Their funds were creatively utilized, which is commendable." The film was selected to appear in the spring showcase of the 2014 American Online Film Awards.

In 2012, Ferguson co wrote directed the short film Mr Cheval and was an associate producer on The Greyness of Autumn. In 2014, he shot for the first time in 4k resolution for the short family film Minion Vs Minon which was produced in association with Futurist Film Ltd for Vue Cinemas. In October of that year, Quick Off The Mark Productions celebrated its 5th birthday. He is currently working on the short film Agley.

On 14 October 2015, it was announced that Ferguson would be moving to Canada and that Quick Off The Mark Productions would close in February 2016.

== Filmography ==
Year	Film	Credited as					Role	Notes
Year	Film	Film director	Camera operator	Screenwriter	Film producer	Actor	Role	Notes
2009	The Wicker Man					Yes	Detective John Hammer	
2009	Kilt Man	Yes		Yes	Yes	Yes	Man with banana	Cameo appearance
2011	The Tragic Meltdown of Pussy Ralph		Yes			Yes	Cliff Turner	
2011	In Search of La Che	Yes	Yes	Yes	Yes	Yes	Mark	
2012	Mr Cheval	Yes	Yes	Yes	Yes			
2012	The Greyness of Autumn				Yes			Associate producer
2014	The Package		Yes					
2014	Minion Vs Minion		Yes		Yes			Associate producer
2015	Broadfoot's Magical Adventure	Yes	Yes	Yes	Yes			

== Awards ==
Year	Nominated Work	Awards	Category	Result
2013	The Greyness of Autumn	British Filmmakers Alliance	Best British Film of the Month (Shared with Chris Quick and Andy S. McEwan)	Won
2015	The Greyness of Autumn	People of Passion Film Festival	Best Short Comedy Film (Shared with Chris Quick and Andy S. McEwan)	Won
2016	Broadfoot's Magical Adventure	Los Angeles Film Awards	Honorable Mention: Dark Comedy (Shared with Chris Quick, Andy S. McEwan, Euan Bennet, Steven Patrick, Michael Cooke, Ashley Ford, Andy Clark and Jennifer Gemmell)	Won
