= Curiosity (2024 film) =

- Directed by: Michael Cooke
- Written by: Michael Cooke
- Produced by: Michael Cooke; Chris Quick
- Starring: Hunter Bishop; John Cooke; Jack Vize; Michael Cooke
- Cinematography: Kasparas Vidunas
- Edited by: Chris Quick
- Music by: Emily Frances Ippolito
- Production company: Michael Cooke Films
- Release date: 1 August 2024
- Running time: 12 minutes
- Country: United Kingdom
- Language: English
- Budget: £3,500

Curiosity is a 2024 horror short film directed by Michael Cooke. The film stars Hunter Bishop, John Cooke and Jack Vize, and explores the dangers that lie deep within the dark web.

== Plot ==
The film follows Kevin, a young man who discovers a video explaining how to access the dark web. Intrigued, he follows the instructions and begins exploring its hidden online spaces. His curiosity leads him to a disturbing livestream featuring a masked individual and a captive victim, exposing him to a world of extreme violence and exploitation. As Kevin continues watching, the distinction between his online activities and the real-world danger surrounding him begins to collapse.

== Cast ==
- Hunter Bishop as Kevin Rundell
- John Cooke as Compare
- Jack Vize as Jacks Facts
- Michael Cooke as Jackson Bogart

== Release and reception ==
The film was released on 01 August 2024 to positive reviews from critics. Film Threat wrote:

"Curiosity packs a lot of punch for a 10-minute, no-budget horror. Writer/director Cooke tells a simple story while adding a bit of technology and chills to create a cohesive package."

Indyred wrote:

"Tremendously well done from start to finish – "Curiosity" gets an easy four & a half stars out of five from me – Michael Cooke nailed this film & could definitely be the next Eli Roth or James Wan in the making."

== Fresh Meat competition ==
In July 2026, Curiosity was announced as a finalist of Fresh Meat, a horror anthology film initiative developed by the Youtube channel Dead Meat.

Out of 550 submissions, Curiosity made the final selection of 30 films from all over the world, and advanced to the public voting stage. Ultimately the film did not make it into the anthology movie, but did receive a screening on the Dead Meat Youtube channel on 18 October 2026.

== Awards ==
Year	Award	Category	Recipient(s)	Result
2024	Diabolical Horror Film Festival	Best Cinematography	Kasparas Vidunas	Won
2024	Diabolical Horror Film Festival	Best Sound	Scott Campbell, Ben Gurber	Nominated
2024	Diabolical Horror Film Festival	Best Short	Michael Cooke	Nominated
2024	Hollywood Horrorfest	Best International Short Thriller	Michael Cooke	Nominated
