= Autumn Never Dies =

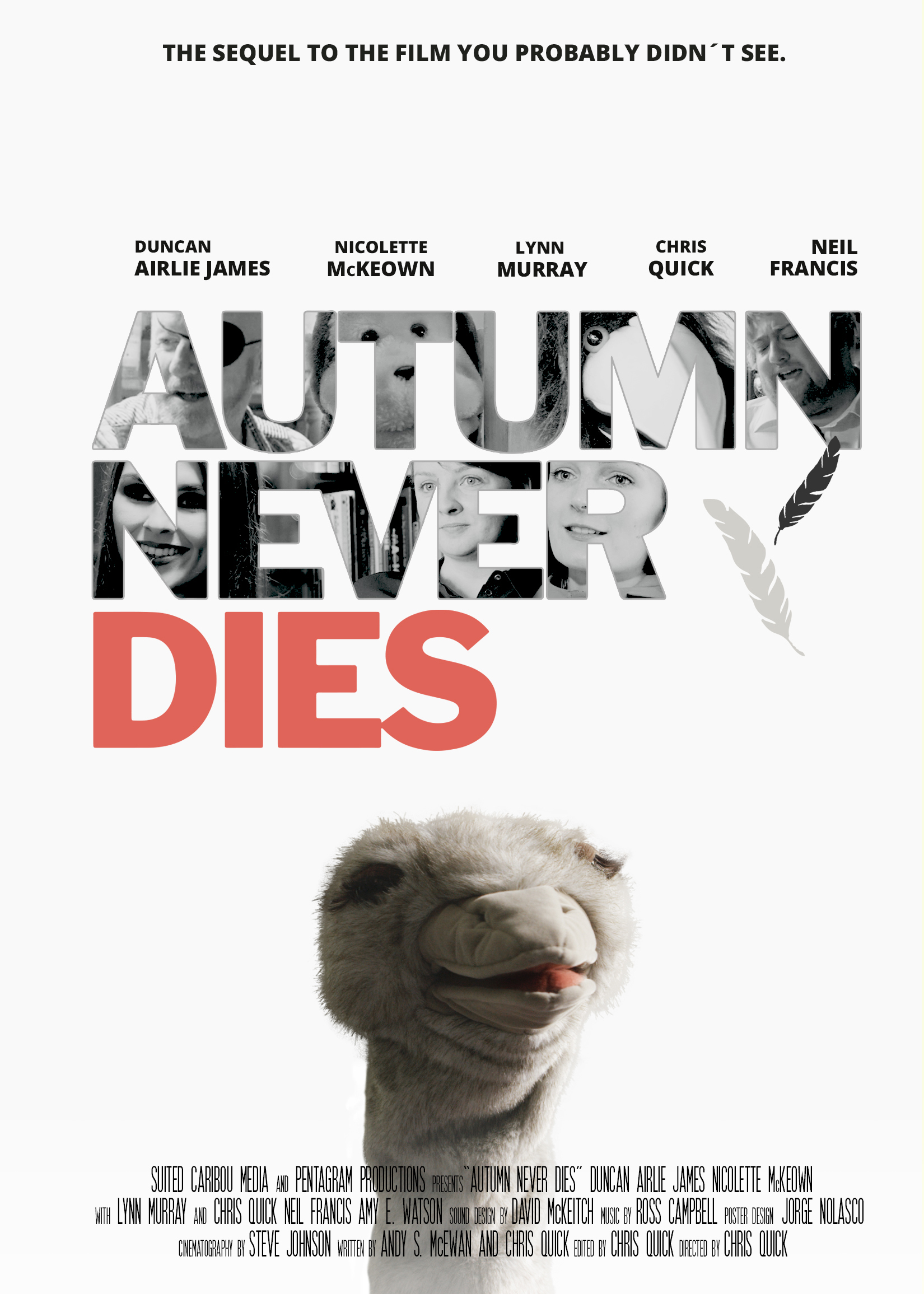
- Directed by: Chris Quick
- Written by: Andy S. McEwan; Chris Quick
- Produced by: Chris Quick; Andy S. McEwan
- Starring: Duncan Airlie James; Amy E Watson; Nicolette McKeown; Lynn Murray; Chris Quick; Neil Francis
- Cinematography: Steve Johnson
- Edited by: Chris Quick
- Music by: Ross Campbell
- Production companies: Suited Caribou Media; Pentagram Productions UK
- Release date: 21 March 2020
- Running time: 26 minutes
- Country: United Kingdom
- Language: English

Autumn Never Dies is a 2020 short comedy film directed by Chris Quick. It stars Duncan Airlie James and Nicollete McKeown, and is the sequel to 2012 short film The Greyness of Autumn. The film was written and produced by Andy S. McEwan and Chris Quick, and was released by Suited Caribou Media and Pentagram Productions UK.

== Plot ==
Puppets Danny and Nelson return in another whirlwind adventure in Autumn Never Dies, the sequel to the 2012 short film, The Greyness of Autumn. When a new love interest enters Danny's life, his past quickly comes back to haunt him, and he must choose a path in life that will truly make him happy.

== Main cast ==
- Duncan Airlie James as Danny McGuire (voice)
- Nicolette McKeown as Lizzie
- Lynn Murray as Dr Crawford
- Chris Quick as Nelson (voice)
- Neil Francis as Barry
- Amy E Watson as Katie
- Ray Crofter as Father Muldoon
- Alan Cuthbert as Mr Caribou (voice)
- John Gaffney as Black Eye Tam
- Jim Sweeney as Terrorist Leader
- Chris Martin as Callaghan / Agent Johnson
- Michael Cooke as Horse / Agent Myers
- Diane Brooks Webster as Natalie
- Darren Connell as Alky Crow

== Production ==
On 17 August 2015, a Kickstarter campaign was launched to raise funds for the production. The campaign raised £1,505 from 44 backers, including former GamesMaster host Dominik Diamond.

== Release and reception ==
The film was released on 21 March 2020 to mark World Puppetry Day.

Autumn Never Dies received highly positive reviews from critics. In the United Kingdom, Jolly Moel of ScreenCritix said:

"Autumn Never Dies would perfectly fit into a TV sitcom format and if Quick and his team can write a 6 part series around the lives of two sock puppets and their human counterparts then send it to a few of the independent cable channels he might just have a genuine cult hit on his hands."

In the United States, Indyred wrote:

"Autumn Never Dies" would be the perfect contender for a regular series. I know I'd watch it. Chris Quick, Andy S McEwan, and the entire cast and crew have put together a winner here for sure."

At the 2021 edition of the Romford Film Festival in London, the film received commendation from the organisers, with festival director Spencer Hawken saying:

"I have not laughed so much in such a long time. This is a really really ridiculously funny film."

== Awards ==
Year	Award	Country	Category	Recipient(s)	Result
2020	Top Indie Film Awards	Japan	Best Short	Andy S. McEwan, Chris Quick	Won
2020	Top Indie Film Awards	Japan	Best Humour	Andy S. McEwan, Chris Quick	Won
2020	Top Indie Film Awards	Japan	Best Editor	Chris Quick	Won
2020	Top Indie Film Awards	Japan	Best Sound	David McKeitch	Won
2020	Top Indie Film Awards	Japan	Best Director	Chris Quick	Nominated
2020	Top Indie Film Awards	Japan	Best Actor	Duncan Airlie James	Nominated
2020	Top Indie Film Awards	Japan	Best Actress	Nicolette McKewon	Nominated
2020	Top Indie Film Awards	Japan	Best Cinematography	Steve Johnson	Nominated
2020	Top Indie Film Awards	Japan	Best Writing	Andy S. McEwan, Chris Quick	Nominated
2020	Top Indie Film Awards	Japan	Best Music	Ross Campbell	Nominated
2020	Top Indie Film Awards	Japan	Best Original Idea	Andy S. McEwan, Chris Quick	Nominated
2020	Alternative Film Festival	Canada	Best Long Short Film	Chris Quick	Won
2020	Swindon Independent Film Festival	England	Best Comedy	Andy S. McEwan, Chris Quick	Nominated
2020	The Scottish Short Film Festival	Scotland	Best Script	Andy S. McEwan, Chris Quick	Won
2020	Portobello Film Festival	England	Best Comedy	Chris Quick	Nominated
2020	Wales International Film Festival	Wales	Best Short Comedy	Andy S. McEwan, Chris Quick	Nominated
2020	Wales International Film Festival	Wales	Jury's Special Prize: Short Comedy	Andy S. McEwan, Chris Quick	Won
2020	Dublin International Short Film & Music Festival	(Republic of Ireland) Ireland	Best Comedy	Chris Quick	Nominated
2020	US Hollywood International Golden Film Awards	United States	Best Outstanding Actor	Duncan Airlie James	Nominated
2020	US Hollywood International Golden Film Awards	United States	Best Actress	Nicolette McKeown	Won
2020	US Hollywood International Golden Film Awards	United States	Best Foreign Film	Andy S. McEwan, Chris Quick	Nominated
2021	Night of Comedy Shorts	Italy	Best Cinematography	Steve Johnson	Won
2021	European Cinematography Awards	Netherlands	Best Comedy Film	Chris Quick	Won
2021	Twin Tiers International Film Festival	United States	Best Comedy Short	Andy S. McEwan, Chris Quick	Nominated
2021	Indy Film Library Awards	Netherlands	Special Commendation: Screenplay	Andy S. McEwan, Chris Quick	Won
2021	Laugh or Die Comedy Film Festival	United States	Best Director	Chris Quick	Nominated
2021	Unrestricted View Film Festival	England	Best Long Short Film	Andy S. McEwan, Chris Quick	Nominated
2021	Queen Palm Film Festival	United States	Best Supporting Actor - Short Film (Silver Award)	Chris Quick	Won
2021	Queen Palm Film Festival	United States	Best Actress - Short Film	Nicolette McKeown	Nominated
2021	Queen Palm Film Festival	United States	Best Writer - Short Film	Andy S. McEwan, Chris Quick	Nominated
2021	Romford Film Festival	England	Best Short Film	Andy S. McEwan, Chris Quick	Nominated
2021	Romford Film Festival	England	Jury Prize	Andy S. McEwan, Chris Quick	Won
2021	Reel Comedy Fest	United States	Best Screenplay	Andy S. McEwan, Chris Quick	Won
2021	Southern Shorts Awards	United States	Best Puppetry	Andy S. McEwan, Chris Quick	Won
2021	The HB Film Festival	Scotland	Best Comedy	Andy S. McEwan, Chris Quick	Nominated
2021	Underground Cinema	(Republic of Ireland) Ireland	Best International Short Film	Andy S. McEwan, Chris Quick	Nominated
2021	FFTG Awards	United States	Best Supporting Actor	Chris Quick	Nominated
2021	FFTG Awards	United States	Best Writer	Andy S. McEwan, Chris Quick	Won
2022	Scotland International Festival of Cinema	Scotland	Best Featurette	Andy S. McEwan, Chris Quick	Nominated
2022	Scotland International Festival of Cinema	Scotland	Best Director	Chris Quick	Nominated
2022	Scotland International Festival of Cinema	Scotland	Best Actor in a Featurette	Duncan Airlie James	Nominated
2022	Scotland International Festival of Cinema	Scotland	Best Actress in a Featurette	Nicolette McKeown	Nominated
2022	Scotland International Festival of Cinema	Scotland	Juan Ruiz Anchia Award for Best Cinematography	Steve Johnson	Nominated
2022	Scotland International Festival of Cinema	Scotland	Best Screenplay Featurette	Andy S. McEwan, Chris Quick	Nominated
2022	Scotland International Festival of Cinema	Scotland	Alan Parsons Award for Best Original Score for a Featurette	Ross Campbell	Nominated
2022	Scotland International Festival of Cinema	Scotland	Best Ensemble Cast in a Featurette	All cast	Nominated
2022	Scotland International Festival of Cinema	Scotland	Indie Spirit Award	Andy S. McEwan, Chris Quick	Won
