= Duncan Airlie James =

Scottish kickboxer and actor

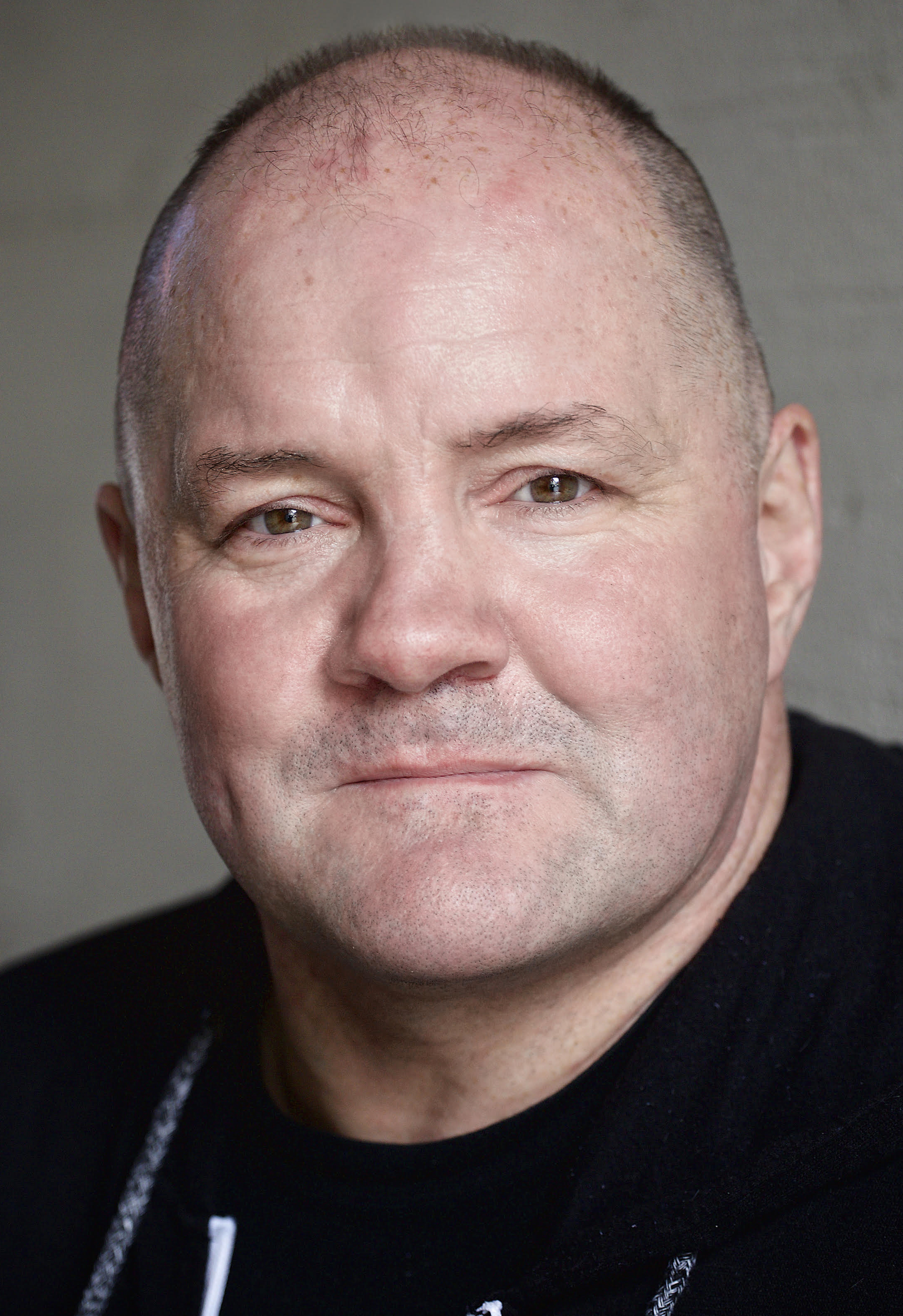
- Born: Duncan Campbell; 23 May 1961 (age 65); Glasgow, Lanarkshire, Scotland, UK
- Height: 5 ft 10 in (178 cm)
- Weight: 15 st 6 lb (98 kg)
- Division: Heavyweight
- Style: Kickboxing, Muay Thai
- Fighting out of: Glasgow, Scotland
- Team: Strikeforce Glasgow Domino’s Kirkintilloch
- Years active: 1993–2006

Kickboxing record
- Total: 48
- Wins: 32
- Losses: 14
- Draws: 2
- No contests: 0

Other information
- Occupation: Actor, former kickboxer
- Website: http://www.duncanairliejames.com/

Duncan Airlie James (born Duncan Campbell; 23 May 1961) is a Scottish retired kickboxer and actor best known for his roles in Tomb Raider and ID2: Shadwell Army. He was the first Scottish fighter to win a world Muay Thai title and fight in K-1.

== Early life ==
James was born Duncan Campbell. He was educated at the fee-paying Keil School, where he was a competitive rugby player. His martial arts background began when he took up Shotokan karate. He was also a drummer and played with a number of bands including Nazareth. He moved to Boston, Massachusetts in the US to pursue new musical avenues.

He is the older brother of Scottish composer Ross Campbell.

== Kickboxing career ==
When James returned to Scotland, he took up Muay Thai kickboxing in the late 1980s. In 1993, he won his first title, the World Kickboxing Association Commonwealth Light Heavyweight Championship. After successfully defending that title, he vacated it and moved up to the Cruiserweight division and later the Heavyweight division, where he won a number of other titles.

In February 1999, he made his K-1 debut against Japanese legend Musashi at K-1 Rising Sun '99 and lost via technical knockout after being knocked down three times in the third round. He fought twice more in Japan that year, drawing with Yoji Anjo and losing to karate master Nobuaki Kakuda.

James retired in 2006 with a record of 32 wins, 14 losses and 2 draws.

=== Titles and honours ===
Muay Thai

- WKA Commonwealth Super Light Heavyweight Champion (1993)
- ISKA World Super Cruiserweight Champion (1998)
- WKN World Heavyweight Champion (2001)
- WAKO World Heavyweight Champion (2003)
- WKF World Heavyweight Champion (2005)
- WPKA World Heavyweight Champion

Kickboxing

- WKO World Cruiserweight Champion (1995)
- WKA World Heavyweight Champion (2001)

=== Kickboxing record ===
32 wins, 14 losses, 2 draws
Date	Result	Opponent	Event	Method	Round	Time	Location	Notes
2006	Loss	(Czech Republic) Daniel Waciakowski		TKO (shoulder injury)				For WPKL and KL World Heavyweight Championships.
15 April 2006	Loss	(Canada) Giuseppe DiNatale	Colosseum 2	TKO (punches)			Winnipeg, Manitoba, Canada	For IKF World Heavyweight Muay Thai Championship.
May, 2005	Win	(Hungary) Tibor Nagy	WPKA/WKF	Decision (unanimous)	-	-	Glasgow, Scotland	Wins WPKA and WKF World Heavyweight Muay Thai Championships.
22 February 2004	Loss	(England) Chris Batcheldor	K-1 Battle of Britain 2004	Decision	3	3:00	Wolverhampton, England	
November, 2003	Win	(Italy) Angelo Grenata	WAKO	TKO	2	-	Palermo, Italy	Wins WAKO World Heavyweight Muay Thai Championship.
13 April 2003	Loss	(England) Phil Williams	K-1 World Grand Prix 2003 Preliminary UK	Decision	5	3:00	Birmingham, England	
5 April 2002	Loss	(Belarus) Sergei Ivanovich		Decision	3	1:53	Motherwell, Scotland	For WAKO and ISKA World Heavyweight Muay Thai Championships.
30 June 2001	Win	(France) Stephane Reveillon	World Kickboxing Network	KO	1	-	Belfast, Northern Ireland	Wins World Kickboxing Network World Heavyweight Muay Thai Championship.
April, 2001	Win			KO	1		Worcester, England	Wins WKA International Super Heavyweight Championship.
16 April 2000	Loss	(England) John Wyatt	K-1 UK Battle of Britain 2000	TKO	2	2:00	Birmingham, England	
6 June 1999	Loss	(Japan) Nobuaki Kakuda	K-1 Survival '99	Decision (unanimous)	5	3:00	Sapporo, Japan	
15 May 1999	Loss	(France) Jerome Turcan	Strikeforce	Decision	5	3:00	San Jose, California, United States	
22 March 1999	Draw	(Japan) Yoji Anjo	K-1 The Challenge '99	Decision	5	3:00	Tokyo, Japan	
3 February 1999	Loss	(Japan) Musashi	K-1 Rising Sun '99	TKO (3 knockdowns)	2	2:52	Tokyo, Japan	
16 August 1998	Loss	(England) Chris Wright		KO	2	2:04	St. Helens, England	Loss I.K.F Pro Muay Thai Cruiserweight World Title.
June, 1998	Win	(France) Christophe de Tholomaise		Decision			Bangor, Northern Ireland	Wins ISKA World Super Cruiserweight Muay Thai Championship.
1997	Win	(England) Paul Senior	WKA: Quest	KO	-	-	Birmingham, England	Wins WKA: Quest Cruiserweight tournament.
September, 1995	Win	(Netherlands) Hassan Babchi		KO	1	-	Glasgow, Scotland	Wins WKO Cruiserweight World Championship.
9 October 1993	Win	(England) Lee Hasdell	WKA	TKO (cut)	-	-	England	Wins WKA Light Heavyweight Commonwealth Muay Thai Championship.

== Acting ==
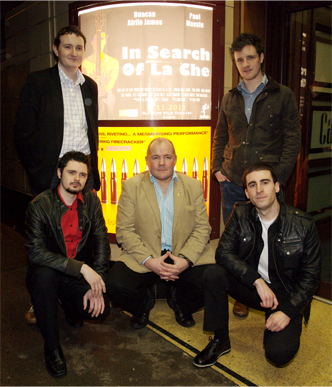
James (centre) at the premiere of In Search of La Che

When he retired from the world of kickboxing, James retrained as an actor. After appearing in a number of short films and a cameo appearance in the film Perfect Sense, he landed his first leading role as John Tavish in the Scottish feature film In Search of La Che. Whilst the film itself received mixed reviews on both sides of the Atlantic, critics applauded James' performance.

2012 saw James star in many varied short films, including The Priest With Two Guns, directed by Rodney Reynolds. The film centres around Father O'Reilly who is troubled when he discovers his brother is in debt to a local money lender. The film won a grand jury prize at the 2014 Amsterdam Film Festival.

Also in 2012, James lent his voice to one of his most recognised roles to date in the short comedy film The Greyness of Autumn. He voiced the character of Danny McGuire, an ostrich living in Glasgow whose life is suddenly turned upside down when he loses his job and his girlfriend in the same day. The film enjoyed great success in the United States, Ireland and the United Kingdom, where it featured in the 2014 edition of the Portobello Film Festival. James' performance was widely praised, with John McArthur of MovieScramble writing, "The hook at the start of the film is the voice of Danny. A deep, resonant and very individual vocal draws you in immediately."

In 2013, James played the role of Officer White opposite Jack O'Connell in Starred Up, a feature film directed by David Mackenzie. Itwon three awards at the 2014 British Academy Scotland Awards, including Best Feature Film.

In 2015, James starred in the leading role of Major Doug Bormann in Fanatic. He was reunited with Luke Aherne, who directed the web series Frank.

== Filmography ==
Year	Title	Director	Role	Notes
2009	Perfect Sense	David Mackenzie	Gym Fighter	
2010	Civilisation	Nicholas Vafio	Harry	
2010	Wrath of a Suffragette	Seth Ward / Kev Bagnall	Gerry	
2010	Godforsaken	Sarah Harlow	Ed	
2011	Lisa Deserves Better	Paul Allison	Daniel	
2011	The Juice	Phil Thompson	Frankie Boy	
2011	Brathair	Eve Leonard	Steven	
2011	In Search of La Che	Mark D. Ferguson	John Tavish	First leading role
2011	Fate Waits	Ben Macgregor	Mark Syllka	
2011	Got It	Dean Howard	Big Al	
2011	Snagged	Mark Brown	Ziggy	
2012	Iustitia	Dave Craig	Iustitia Omnibus	
2012	Violation	Peter Hardy / Charlie Parker	Commander Grier	
2012	Dust	Paul MacAdam	Thommo	
2012	Loan	Ruahdri Hunter	Gerry	
2012	The Priest with Two Guns	Rodney Reynolds	Father O'Reilly	
2012	The Greyness of Autumn	Chris Quick	Danny McGuire	Voice
2013	Starred Up	David Mackenzie	Officer White	
2013	Jab, Cross, Hook	Shaun Sutton	Tam McLean	
2013	Unsuitable	Naomi Phillips	Jimmy	
2013	Fleshmarket Close	Eve Leonard	Duncan	
2014	Glory Hunter	Craig Maclachlan	Jerry Gallagher	
2014	Mitchum	Jemma Sutherland	Detective Inspector Mitchum	TV pilot
2014	K'Nibble	Andrew Dobbie	Gregg McLaren	
2014	Frank	Luke Aherne	Jim	Web series
2014	Con	Laura Briggs	Tom	
2014	Tanner Park	Ian Hendry	Iggy	
2014	Two Smoking Barrels	Asib Akram	Frank Vincent	
2014	A Quiet Day	Martin Heron	Joe	
2015	Prescription R	Andrew Dobbie	Robert "Boab" Baxter	
2015	Fanatic	Luke Aherne	Major Doug Bormann	
2016	Directions	Oliver Greenall	Robert	
2016	ID2: Shadwell Army	Joel Novoa	Hunt	
2016	Flux	Anthony Scott	Boris	
2016	Essex Spacebin	David Hollinshead	Gangster	
2016	The Victorious	Chris Anstey	Captain Bernard Gregory	
2016	Ground Below	Toby Saunders	Mitch	
2017	Locked In	Pavel Shepan	Brian	
2018	Frank	Luke Aherne	Jim	
2018	Synced	Devon Avery	Skin Head Colin	
2018	Outlaw King	David Mackenzie	Beaumont	
2018	Tomb Raider	Roar Uthaug	Terry	
2018	Wild is the North	Hayley McInline	Wadard	
2020	Autumn Never Dies	Chris Quick	Danny McGuire / The Chief	
2020	Jingle Jangle	David E. Talbert	Constable Carruthers	
2020	A Song Still Inside	James Hall, Edward Lovelace	Foreman Brown / Husband	
2021	Web Crawler	Paul J. Lane	Alfie Trespass	
2021	Opal	Kirsty Mclean	Father	
2021	Wild is the North	Hayley McInline	Wadard	
2021	Go Home	Razan Madhoon	Guard	
2022	Because We Are Too Many	Eve Leonard	Uncle John	

== Awards ==
Year	Nominated work	Awards	Category	Result
2019	The Victorious	I Am Film Festival	Best Showreel Scene Actor	Nominated
2020	Autumn Never Dies	Top Indie Film Awards	Best Actor	Nominated
2020	Autumn Never Dies	US Hollywood International Golden Film Awards	Best Outstanding Actor	Nominated
2022	Autumn Never Dies	Scotland International Festival of Cinema	Best Actor in a Featurette	Nominated
2022	Autumn Never Dies	Scotland International Festival of Cinema	Best Ensemble Cast in a Featurette (Shared with All Cast)	Nominated
