= Gary McLellan =

Scottish Filmmaker

Deputy Director of the Glasgow Filmmakers Alliance
- In office 1 July 2019 – 31 December 2021
- Preceded by: Chris Quick

Personal details
- Education: SAE Institute
- Occupation: Filmmaker

Gary McLellan is a Scottish filmmaker and former student of the SAE Institute in Glasgow. In July 2019, he became the deputy director of the Glasgow Filmmakers Alliance following the promotion of Chris Quick to director of the organisation. On 31 December 2021, McLellan stood down as deputy director.

== Filmography ==
Year	Film	Credited as			Notes
Year	Film	Director	Producer	Actor	Notes
	Thursdays Son	Yes	Yes		
2018	The Vanishing			Yes	Bones
2019	Hard Boiled	Yes			
2022	Angry Young Men				Production Assistant

== See also ==
- Glasgow Filmmakers Alliance
- SAE Institute

Media offices
Preceded by Chris Quick	Deputy Director; Glasgow Filmmakers Alliance; 2019–2021	Succeeded by Vacant
