= 2016 British Academy Scotland New Talent Awards =

- Date: 14 April 2016
- Site: Drygate Brewery
- Hosted by: Muriel Gray

The 2016 British Academy Scotland New Talent Awards took place on 14 April 2016 at the Drygate Brewery. Presented by BAFTA Scotland, the accolades honour the best upcoming talent in the field of film and television in Scotland. The nominees were announced on 15 March 2016. The ceremony was hosted by Muriel Gray. British director Danny Boyle made a surprise guest appearance at the event to present the accolade for Best New Work.

== Winners and nominees ==
Winners are listed first and highlighted in boldface.

Best Actor	Best Actress
**Daniel Cameron - I Am Me**: Christopher Martin - Open Mike; Nathan McHallam - Crowman	**Sarah Miele – Grimm Street**: Lily Graham - Take Your Partners; Claire Sheerin – Perfect Strangers
Best Drama	Best Entertainment
**Hula**: Lucid; Starfish	**Paperclip**: James Morrison Versus; Last Exit To Ricklesburgh
Best Writer	Best Editor
**Michal Wdowiak – Yogi**: Johnny Herbin - Electric Faces; Charlotte Wells - Tuesday	**Michal Wdowiak - Yogi**: Jonathon Bulter - Open Mike; Wayne Mazadza - Microcosm
Best Factual	Best Camera / Photography
**The Third Dad – Theresa Moerman Ib**: Dear Peter – Scott Willis, Josh Sabin; Knox - Murdo Macleod, Philip Todd	**Kris Kubik - Dipper from the Water of Leith**: Charlie Rose – Grout Pray; Mihail Ursu – No Place Like Home
Best Sound	Best Composer
**Gaby Yanez – Lemuria**: Donald Dawson - Bomber Boys: Prisoners of Time; Sean Hall - The Legend of Hammerfall	**Atzi Muramatsu - The Violinist**: Yoann Mylonakis – Lemuria; Tommy Reilly – The Beholder
Best Design	Best Animation
**Cara Roxburgh - Tuesday**: Lola-Blanche Higgins - Grout Pray; Janine Koppe - Blue Hour	**The Armadillo and the Earwig - Benjamin Cresswell**: The Last Day - Muqing Shu, Dongjian Ji, Terry Peng; Nina & Flick - Vera Babida, Robert Duncan

=== Special Award for New Work ===
Kris Kubik - Dipper from the Water of Leith

== See also ==
- 2015 British Academy Scotland Awards
