= Steve Nallon =

British actor, writer and voice artist (born 1960)

- Born: 8 December 1960 (age 65); Leeds, UK
- Occupations: Actor, writer, voice artist, impressionist

Steve Nallon (born 8 November 1960) is a British actor, writer, voice artist and impressionist. Nallon began his career as a stand-up performer on the northern club circuit in the 1970s.

He is known for his work as a voice artist on the satirical puppet show Spitting Image and for impersonating Margaret Thatcher on television throughout her time as Prime Minister of the UK (1979–1990). In his career Steve Nallon has performed a number of roles and characters as an actor and as a voice artist in theatre, film, television and radio.

== Early life ==
Nallon was born on 8 November 1960, in Leeds. His father was a church caretaker who had a long history of mental health issues. His mother died in 1970 when Steve was nine years old. Because of his father's mental instability it became necessary for Nallon and his sister to move in with their maternal grandparents. Nallon later described his early years as "at times a tough and sometimes rocky childhood." After passing his 11-plus Nallon attended St. Michael's College, a Jesuit school in Leeds. Whilst still at school, he developed a comedy act and performed from the age of 16 in local working men's clubs in Yorkshire and the North.

In 1979, Nallon began studying Drama and English at the University of Birmingham.

== Career ==
Nallon worked as a stand-up comedian on the northern club circuit in the 1970s. After taking a degree in English and Drama he had a short time in repertory theatre at Theatr Clwyd (1983) before becoming a founding member of the Spitting Image team in 1984. The series aired on the ITV network for twelve years from 1984 to 1996 and featured puppet caricatures of celebrities. Although Nallon became well known for providing the voice of Margaret Thatcher on the show, he also voiced many of the show's other characters, including Roy Hattersley, The Queen Mother, Alan Bennett, David Attenborough, Harold Wilson, Bruce Forsyth, Robert Runcie, Edward Heath, Shirley Williams, David Frost and Malcolm Rifkind.

As an actor, Nallon has performed in several musicals including as Narrator in The Rocky Horror Show at Leicester Haymarket Theatre and as Jacque in Carnival as part of a staged reading at the Barbican. On film, he appeared as the family doctor in The Girl With Brains in Her Feet, a film about a talented teenage athlete who struggles to come to terms with the traumas of life. In 2015, he appeared as Professor Richards in the film 51 Degrees North.

As a voice artist and puppeteer, Nallon has performed in various TV puppet series including Cats' Eyes (as Jimmy) BBC Two, The House of Gristle (as the mother) BBC One, Crazy Cottage (as Vera, the cuckoo) ITV, What's Up Doc? (as Cassie) ITV, The Spooks of Bottle Bay (as Lady Dingledale, Lily, and Daffy Spook) ITV and Dan and Dusty (as Dusty) ITV.

As an established impersonator and impressionist Nallon has worked on various TV shows. In 2003 he was interviewed for the BBC One history of the comic impressionist Who Did You Do? presented by Ricky Gervais. Nallon featured on the BBC's tribute to the art and craft of the impressionist, Night of a Thousand Faces (2001), and he guest starred on Alistair McGowan's Big Impression series (2001) and The Impressionable Jon Culshaw series (2004). During the 1980s, Steve worked with Rory Bremner on several series including Now Something Else and The Rory Bremner Show. In 1985, he also appeared with Mike Yarwood on his final TV series for ITV. More recently Nallon voiced David Cameron on Harry Hill's TV Burp. Other voice artist credits include the video game Overlord and the mobile app Headcaster (2016) as David Cameron and Jeremy Corbyn.

Nallon continues to perform in the guise of Margaret Thatcher. In 2011, he provided the voice of Thatcher for the film In Search of La Che, and in 2015 was cast as Thatcher in Jonathan Maitland's play Dead Sheep. Nallon has provided the voice of Margaret Thatcher since 2011 in the BBC Radio Four series UK Confidential which examines Government Cabinet papers released under the 30-year rule. During Margaret Thatcher's term in office Nallon appeared as Thatcher in The New Statesman with Rik Mayall. In 2016, voiced Thatcher for the national tour of the theatre dance show Coal created by Gary Clarke which included a section on the miners' strike of 1985.

Nallon has also worked as a writer. In 1989, Nallon co-wrote I, Margaret with Tom Holt, a spoof autobiography of Baroness Thatcher, published by Macmillan. In 1999, Nallon co-wrote The Ghost of Number Ten and The Nallon Tapes for BBC Radio Four. He performed all the voices in The Nallon Tapes, and in The Ghost of Number Ten he played the multi-voiced computer. Nallon has made contributions to New Statesman and the magazine Musical Stages.

In 2022, Nallon's young adult fiction novel The Time That Never Was (ISBN 978-1-910022-61-0), the first in THE SWIDGERS book series, was published by Luath Press. Destination Time Travel (ISBN 978-1-80425-101-0), co-written with Dick Fiddy, archivist at the British Film Institute, was published in 2023 by Luath Press. Destination Time Travel is a look at the story tropes of time travel tales, exploring time travel plots, story devices, time paradoxes, causal loops, time guardians and time windows. The book was published to coincide with the Destination Time Travel season at the British Film Institute in October and November 2023.

Nallon has written and performed in three one-man shows. In 2002, Nallon wrote and appeared in The Big Odyssey, a theatrical adaptation of Homer's Odyssey, which was staged at the Assembly Rooms as part of the Edinburgh Fringe Festival. The show had a nationwide tour in 2003. Also in 2003 Nallon wrote Steve Nallon's Christmas Carol, a theatrical adaptation of Charles Dickens' A Christmas Carol, which he performed the Birmingham Repertory Theatre and in 2004 Nallon wrote and starred in Steve Nallon's Adventure's in Wonderland, a theatrical adaptation of Lewis Carroll's famous books. This show was staged at fringe festivals in Buxton and Edinburgh.

Nallon played Ada/Roy in a 2013 national tour of Cissie and Ada: An Hysterical Rectomy, a stage show based upon the characters played by Les Dawson and Roy Barraclough. The show is also a character study of Dawson.

In 2014, Nallon appeared as Dame Trott in Jack and the Beanstalk at the Buxton Opera House.

In 2015, Nallon voiced various characters in the pantomime section of Clementine's Seasonal Spectacular, a puppet show which combined live puppets and video projection, which was staged at the Rosemary Branch theatre in Islington. These included an impersonation of Beryl Reid as the Fairy Godmother and Peter Lorre as Coldfinger, a parody of the 007 villain.
