= Portobello Film Festival =

- Location: London, England
- Founded: 1996
- Awards: Golden Boot, Trellick
- Website: http://www.portobellofilmfestival.com/

The Portobello Film Festival is an independent international film festival based in London, which annually premiers over 700 new films, including features, shorts, documentaries, music films, and animation. Additionally, workshops and talks with top film directors (such as Stephen Frears and John Maybury) are also featured. Admission to the three-week-long festival is free of charge.

== Origins ==
The Film Festival was created in 1996 as a reaction to the state of the British film industry, which was perceived as declining, to provide a forum for new film-makers and give exposure to movies on different formats. Many previously obscure directors have been gained recognition in the industry after debuting at the festival, including Shane Meadows and Guy Ritchie. The festival was dubbed "West London’s favourite pop-up" by Time Out London

== Dr. Martens Golden Boot Award ==
On the last day of the festival, a Golden Boot award is presented to the best new independent film or video, sponsored by Dr. Martens.
