= Graham Hughes (director) =

Scottish film director

- Born: Glasgow, Scotland
- Occupation: Film director
- Years active: 2011–present
- Notable work: Death of a Vlogger; A Practical Guide to a Spectacular Suicide; Falling for Fitzgerald; The Big Slick

Graham Hughes is a Scottish filmmaker best known for his acclaimed found footage feature films Death of a Vlogger (2019) and Hostile Dimensions (2023).

== Life and career ==
Born in Kirkintilloch, Hughes graduated in 2009 from Stirling University with a degree in Film and Media studies. Together with childhood friends Graeme McGeagh and Keith Grantham, Hughes began writing what would become his first film The Big Slick. The feature-length comedy film, which also starred the trio in acting roles, tells the story of six young guys whose efforts to spend a quiet night in, quickly spiral out of control. The film was a critical success and was chosen to open the 2012 Loch Ness film festival. In March 2011, it was announced that Hughes, McGeagh and Grantham had been nominated for a British Academy Scotland New Talent Award for best achievement in writing. Hosted by Kaye Adams, the 2011 British Academy Scotland New Talent Awards took place at the Glasgow Film Theatre on 11 March and despite strong competition, the trio struck gold by taking home the Best Writing accolade.

Following the success of The Big Slick, Hughes was invited to co-produce the short romantic comedy Falling for Fitzgerald by Amy Hawes. The film centres around Melanie (played by Lynn Murray) in her pursuit over her unobtainable best friend, Fitzgerald. Actress Lynn Murray went on to pick up the Best Acting Performance accolade at the 2012 British Academy Scotland New Talent Awards.

In late 2012, Hughes reunited with McGeagh and Grantham to pen their next feature film, A Practical Guide to A Spectacular Suicide. The film, starring McGeagh in the leading role, tells the story of Tom, a troubled man whose string of suicide attempts leads him to plan what he dubs will be his own 'spectacular suicide'. After failing to secure funding from the Scottish arts body Creative Scotland the trio turned to the public and sourced the budget for the film through a crowd funding channel. Raising over £3000 for the production, filming began in 2013 and was completed in just 13 days. The film was released in 2014 and quickly became an international hit. On the festival circuit, the film had its American premiere at the Cinequest Film Festival in California, and in the UK the film was shown for the first time at the Edinburgh International Film Festival where Hughes was nominated for the Michael Powell Award for Best British Film. The film was further decorated with 2 nominations at the 2014 British Academy Scotland New Talent Awards for Best Film and for Best Acting Performance for Graeme McGeagh. In September 2014, Hughes was invited as a special guest to take part in the British & Irish Film season at the Ciné Utopia in Limpertsberg, Luxembourg.

In 2018, Hughes began work on his third feature film, supernatural horror Death of a Vlogger. The film was completed early 2019 and premiered at FrightFest London in summer of that year. The film went on to be long-listed for a BIFA Discovery award. In March 2020, Death of a Vlogger was programmed for an encore FrightFest screening, as part of their strand at Glasgow Film Festival, the first time for this to happen in the festivals history. The film has been received positively from audiences and critics, with Rafael Motamayor of /Film giving it 9 out of 10 and calling it "A twisted story of warped perceptions, megalomania, the victims in the middle of media manipulation and our own obsession with online cruelty that results in a breath of fresh air in an overcrowded genre."

== Filmography ==
Year	Film	Credited as						Notes
Year	Film	Director	Writer	Producer	Editor	Actor	Role	Notes
2011	The Big Slick	Yes	Yes	Yes	Yes	Yes	Alex	Directorial Debut
2011	Falling for Fitzgerald			Yes				Co Producer
2014	A Practical Guide to a Spectacular Suicide	Yes	Yes	Yes	Yes			
2014	Epic Wrap Battle	Yes	Yes	Yes				
2015	Christmas Eve of the Dead	Yes	Yes	Yes		Yes	Zombie #4	
2019	Death of a Vlogger	Yes	Yes	Yes	Yes	Yes	Graham	
2020	On the Moon	Yes	Yes	Yes	Yes			
2023	Hostile Dimensions	Yes	Yes	Yes	Yes	Yes	Not Brian	produced with Evrim Ersoy

== Awards ==
Year	Nominated Work	Awards	Category	Result
2011	The Big Slick	British Academy Scotland New Talent Awards	Best Writer (Shared with Graeme McGeagh and Keith Grantham)	Won
2014	A Practical Guide to a Spectacular Suicide	British Academy Scotland New Talent Awards	Best Film	Nominated
2014	A Practical Guide to a Spectacular Suicide	Cinequest San Jose Film Festival	New Vision Award (Director)	Nominated
2014	A Practical Guide to a Spectacular Suicide	Edinburgh International Film Festival	Michael Powell Award for Best British Feature Film	Nominated
2019	Death of a Vlogger	Unrestricted View Horror Film Festival	Love Horror Award	Won
2019	Death of a Vlogger	BIFA	Discovery Award	Long-listed
2019	Death of a Vlogger	Molins Horror Film Festival	Best Film	Won
2023	Hostile Dimensions	Molins Horror Film Festival	Best Screenplay	Won
2023	Hostile Dimensions	Imagine Film Festival	Best Feature	Nominated
