= Glasgow Filmmakers Alliance =

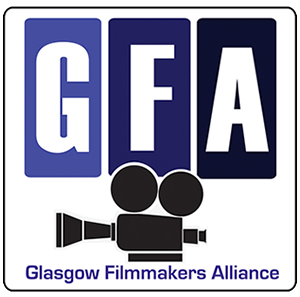
- GFA Logo
- Abbreviation: GFA
- Formation: 2011
- Type: Non Profit Organisation
- Region served: Glasgow, Scotland
- Director: Chris Quick
- Deputy Director: Vacant
- Website: glasowfilm.co.uk

The Glasgow Filmmakers Alliance (GFA) is an online directory listing individuals and companies who are associated with film and television production in and around the city of Glasgow in Scotland. It was founded in 2011 by Scottish actor Andrew O'Donnell and Chris Quick, a Scottish film editor. Their motto is "Whatever the weather, we stand together".

== History ==
The idea of the directory came about during the filming of In Search of La Che when Quick felt there was no central place to find professional talent both in front and behind the camera. Soon after filming finished, he discussed the idea with O'Donnell and the pair launched what would become the Glasgow Filmmakers Alliance on 31 October 2011.

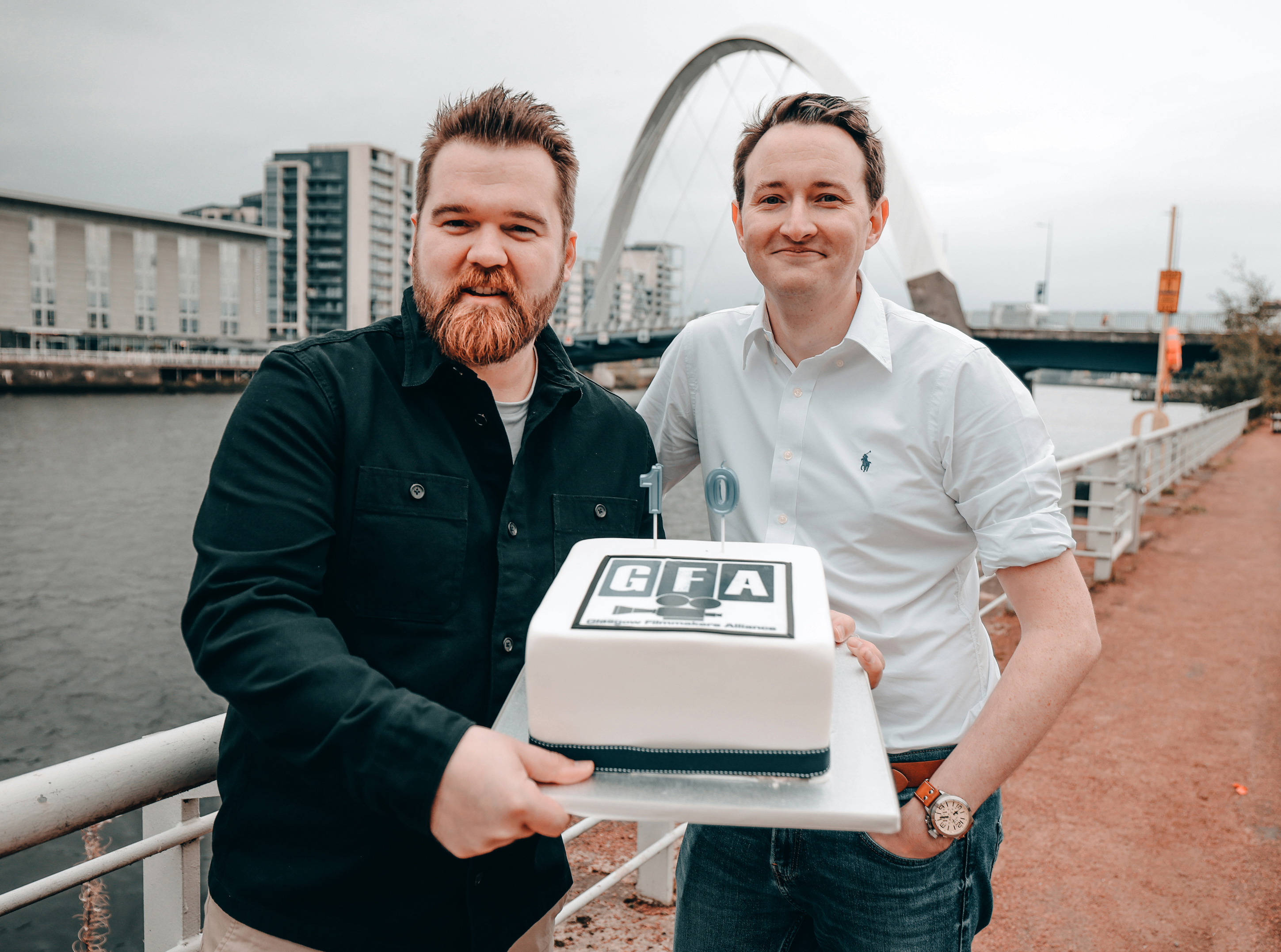
Andrew O'Donnell reunited with Chris Quick in October 2021 to celebrate the 10th anniversary of the Glasgow Filmmakers Alliance.

In 2012, the alliance was invited by Stephen Paton of Production Attic to form what would become the Glasgow Creative Network which hosts networking events for media professionals in Glasgow.

A supporter of independent film, Quick led a campaign to get the British Academy Scotland New Talent Awards recognised by IMDB stating that 'they represented the best of emerging Scottish talent'. The campaign was successful and the awards were introduced to the site later that year. He later repeated this success with the inclusion of the Virgin Media Short Awards after the first double win by Scottish director John McPhail.

In 2014, Quick and O'Donnell wrote an open letter on behalf of the independent filmmakers of Glasgow to the director of BAFTA Scotland, Jude MacLaverty. In the letter, the pair asked the film body to consider a proposal of including three new awards at the annual ceremony aimed at low budget / independent filmmakers. On 28 October it was announced that the proposal would be placed on the agenda of the next Bafta Scotland Committee meeting in December 2014.

On 2 April 2015, the BAFTA Scotland committee released their response to the proposals put forward by the Glasgow Filmmakers Alliance.

In March 2017, O'Donnell and Quick both signed the open letter to the Arts Council, England, objecting to the organisations decision not to renew the visa for American born actor Tyler Collins.

In May 2019, O'Donnell announced his departure from the organisation and was succeeded by Quick with Gary McLellan taking on the role of deputy.

On 31 December 2021, McLellan stood down as Deputy Director.

== Film funding ==
The alliance has financially contributed small amounts to various films in and around Glasgow. Below is a list of some projects it has supported.

- A Fire Within
- Bad Blood
- Boys Night
- Bridge
- Bunny
- By The Bay
- Camp Abercorn (Note: American project but starred Glasgow actor Declan Michael Laird)
- Crime
- Custodian
- Exodus 21:24
- Fertility Daze
- Fractured Minds
- Frank
- In The Fall
- Killing Me Softly With Her Love
- Murphy's Birthday
- Premature
- Promenade
- Ribbons
- Sundown
- The Naiads
- The Outsider
- A Practical Guide To A Spectacular Suicide
- Tellurian
- The Gaelic King
- The River Runs Red
- Turning Tide
- Wait
- Wild Is The North
- Wonderland

== Directors & Deputy Directors ==
=== Directors ===
No.	Image	Name	Tenure	Duration
1		Andrew O'Donnell	31 October 2011 - 30 June 2019	7 years, 242 days
2		Chris Quick	1 July 2019 - Incumbent	7 years, 72 days

=== Deputy Directors ===
No.	Image	Name	Tenure	Duration
1		Chris Quick	31 October 2011 - 30 June 2019	7 years, 242 days
2		Gary McLellan	1 July 2019 - 31 December 2021	2 years, 183 days
