= Andy O'Donnell =

Andy O'Donnell may refer to:

- Andy O'Donnell (footballer) (1885–1965), Australian rules footballer
- Andy O'Donnell (basketball) (born 1925), American basketball player

== See also ==
- Andrew O'Donnell, Scottish actor and co-founder of the Glasgow Filmmakers Alliance
