= Hostile Dimensions =

2023 found footage film by Graham Hughes

- Official poster
- Directed by: Graham Hughes
- Written by: Graham Hughes
- Produced by: Evrim Ersoy, Graham Hughes
- Edited by: Graham Hughes
- Release date: 26 August 2023 (FrightFest)
- Running time: 80 minutes
- Country: UK
- Language: English

Hostile Dimensions is a 2023 found footage sci-fi horror feature film directed and written by Graham Hughes, about two documentary filmmakers who travel through alternate dimensions to uncover the truth about a graffiti artist who has vanished.

Hostile Dimensions was named by Rotten Tomatoes one of the "Top 100 Best Found Footage Movies".

== Plot ==
The film follows documentary filmmakers Sam and Ash as they investigate the disappearance of graffiti artist Emily, who vanishes after encountering a freestanding door in an abandoned building. Footage of her disappearance, recorded by her friend Brian, is later posted online. Sam urges Ash to help locate the door in the hope of finding Emily, though Ash is initially hesitant. After visiting Emily’s home on the Isle of Bute and finding signs of her sudden absence, including unopened mail and a note expressing concern for her well-being, Ash becomes convinced that Emily has truly disappeared. The pair locate the door and move it into Sam’s flat to investigate further.

They interview Brian, who confirms that Emily disappeared after interacting with the door and warns them against further involvement. He compares the door to hazardous sites such as nuclear waste storage, explaining that such locations are designed to deter human interaction through warnings and ominous design. Despite his warnings, Sam and Ash proceed with their investigation.

When they open the door, it reveals anomalous and shifting phenomena rather than a normal interior space. Initially, the door appears to contain a mirror reflecting the room, but subsequent interactions produce increasingly surreal occurrences, including the appearance of Sam’s deceased mother and a talking dog. The two begin documenting their findings and formulating theories about the door’s nature, ranging from psychological effects to alternate dimensions.

To test the environment beyond the door, they send a remote-controlled car equipped with a camera through it, discovering what appears to be an abandoned indoor playground. Believing the area to be safe, they enter the space themselves, using a doorstop to prevent the door from closing. Inside, they encounter signs directing them deeper into the area, eventually leading to a large panda mascot that animates and pursues them with hostile, tentacle-like appendages. They narrowly escape and barricade the door.

Seeking further understanding, Sam and Ash consult a professor named Innis, who suggests that similar phenomena have appeared in online folklore and obscure recordings. He introduces the concept of “wolf doors,” theorized gateways to other planes of existence possibly connected to ancient practices or rituals. He also suggests that some groups may believe human sacrifices are required to maintain stability between worlds. Innis agrees to assist them.

Innis demonstrates that the door’s output may be influenced by thought, prompting Ash to name their favorite animal before opening it. The resulting environment reflects this input, featuring surreal elements such as a flying humpback whale. After returning to the flat, the group relaxes, but later that night the door opens on its own and a distressed Emily emerges. They contact Brian, but when he arrives, Emily realizes he is an impostor. The man subdues them and abducts Ash through the door.

Sam, Emily, and Innis regroup and determine that the impostor has replaced the real Brian. Sam and Emily enter the door to search for Ash, arriving in a coastal area containing multiple similar doors. As they explore various environments, including a maze-like urban ruin and a church-like structure containing another version of Emily, they encounter increasingly dangerous and surreal entities. Meanwhile, Innis travels to Brian’s flat to locate the real Brian.

At the flat, Innis discovers video evidence revealing that the impostor orchestrated Emily’s disappearance and has been using the doors to manipulate and abduct individuals. He finds the real Brian trapped in a looping spatial anomaly beneath the floor and frees him. Brian explains that the impostor can create new portals by drawing door outlines, allowing him to spread the phenomenon widely.

On the beach, Sam confronts the impostor while Emily continues searching for Ash through another door. After a pursuit across multiple shifting environments, Sam creates a doorway herself, apparently defeating the impostor. She returns to the beach and reunites with Emily and Ash, where the impostor reappears and attempts to assert control over the situation. Moments later, he is struck by lightning and disappears. Following this, the surrounding environment begins to collapse as the remaining doors are destroyed.

As the survivors attempt to leave before the exit is destroyed, Sam refuses to return, choosing instead to remain within the alternate realities in pursuit of an ideal world. Emily and Ash exit the door and return to reality, where they reunite with Innis. The door is revealed to have become inert.

Seven months later, Ash records that Sam remains missing and that investigations into the events are ongoing. They reveal that they have learned how to create similar doors. Alongside Emily, Brian, and Innis, they open a newly constructed door and address an unseen presence. The entity that appears is the same talking dog encountered earlier, which asks if they are ready to begin.

== Main Cast ==
- Annabel Logan as Sam
- Joma West as Ash
- Paddy Kondracki as Innis
- Josie Rogers as Emily
- Stephen Beavis as Brian
- Graham Hughes as Not Brian

== Production ==
Director/writer Graham Hughes came up with the movie while developing a larger film project with Blue Finch, the sales company of Hostile Dimensions, as a means to pave the way for the bigger project.

He initially intended to do it in a way similar to his previous film, Death of a Vlogger, keeping the mockumentary format and using the same cast and crew, as well as trying to shoot most of the movie in his flat.

Yet Hughes also wanted it to be different from Death of a Vlogger, so he looked for ways to expand it, and so the idea of a portal to other worlds came into being, and everything spiralled from there.

== Release ==
The movie premiered on August 26, 2023 at FrightFest in London, followed by the North American premiere on October 4th, 2023 at Beyond Fest in Los Angeles. It also screened in 2023 at MOTELx Horror Film Festival in Portugal, Trieste Science+Fiction Festival in Italy, Imagine Film Festival in Netherlands, Night Visions in Finland, Molins Horror Film Festival in Spain, and in 2024 at Panic Fest in the US and Octopus Film Festival in Poland.

It was released commercially by Dark Sky Films for streaming in North America on August 23, 2024.

== Reception ==
=== Critical response ===
On Rotten Tomatoes the movie holds an 86% approval rating based on 14 reviews. It has garnered positive reviews for its inventive approach to the found footage genre. Leslie Felperin of The Guardian described the film as having “wit and a few fun ideas,” noting its ability to entertain despite budget constraints. Elisabeth Vincentelli from The New York Times appreciated the film’s exploration of “the multiple planes of existence that are revealed behind the various so-called wolf doors.” Megan Williams lauded it as “yet another enjoyable delight from Graham Hughes,” highlighting the director’s consistent delivery of engaging content. Dolores Quintana of Nightmarish Conjurings praised the movie as “an original found footage gem that glories in the horror of suggestion and existential crisis with humor and the sensitive gutsiness of its leads.” Kat Hughes from The Hollywood News commended the film, stating, “It’s another solid hit for Scottish director Graham Hughes,” and emphasizing its blend of science fiction elements with unexpected scares. Anton Bitel of SciFiNow described it as “scary, funny sci-fi on a budget,” noting its ability to conjure surreal, otherworldly realms while grounding the narrative in everyday Scottish life. Overall, critics have recognized Hostile Dimensions for its clever storytelling, effective use of the found footage format, and Hughes’ distinctive directorial style.

=== Awards and nominations ===
Event (year)	Award	Recipient	Result	Ref.
Molins Horror Film Festival (2024)	Best Screenplay	Graham Hughes	Won	
Imagine Film Festival (2024)	Best Feature	Graham Hughes	Nominated	

== See also ==
- Multiverse
- Everything Everywhere All at Once
