= Anna and the Apocalypse =

2017 film by John McPhail

- Theatrical release poster
- Directed by: John McPhail
- Screenplay by: Alan McDonald; Ryan McHenry
- Based on: "Zombie Musical" (short film) by Ryan McHenry
- Produced by: Naysun Alae-Carew; Nicholas Crum; Tracy Jarvis
- Starring: Ella Hunt; Malcolm Cumming; Sarah Swire; Christopher Leveaux; Marli Siu; Ben Wiggins; Mark Benton; Paul Kaye
- Cinematography: Sara Deane
- Edited by: Mark Hermida
- Music by: Roddy Hart; Tommy Reilly
- Production companies: Blazing Griffin; Parkhouse Pictures; Constellation Creatives; Creative Scotland
- Distributed by: Vertigo Releasing
- Release dates: 22 September 2017 (Fantastic Fest); 30 November 2018 (United Kingdom)
- Running time: 98 minutes
- Country: United Kingdom
- Language: English
- Box office: $673,523

Anna and the Apocalypse is a 2017 British Christmas musical zombie film directed by John McPhail from a screenplay by Alan McDonald and Ryan McHenry, based on McHenry's 2010 BAFTA-nominated short Zombie Musical. It stars an ensemble cast of largely unknown young talent, including Ella Hunt, Malcolm Cumming, Sarah Swire, Christopher Leveaux, Marli Siu and Ben Wiggins with Mark Benton and Paul Kaye.

The film premiered at Fantastic Fest on 22 September 2017. It was released in the United Kingdom by Vertigo Releasing and the United States by Orion Pictures on 30 November 2018 to generally positive reviews from critics, commending the performances, musical numbers and characterisation.

== Plot ==
It is Christmastime in Little Haven, Scotland, and Anna Shepherd is about to finish school. She plans to travel for a year before going to university, much to the displeasure of her widower father, Tony. Her friends are dealing with their own issues: her best friend John, an artist, is secretly in love with her, budding filmmaker Chris is struggling with a class assignment, and transfer student Steph, whose girlfriend has left her during the holiday break, is trying to get her social justice reporting past the tyrannical vice principal Mr. Savage. Nick, Anna's one-night stand, is also making her life difficult. On the night of the school Christmas show, in which Chris's girlfriend Lisa is performing, Anna and John work in the local bowling alley, and Chris and Steph go to the homeless shelter to film Steph's story. During this time, a zombie infection starts spreading.

The following day, Anna and John leave for the school, completely oblivious to the zombie chaos around them. When they encounter a zombie dressed as a snowman, Anna decapitates him with a seesaw. At the school, a group of adults, including Chris's grandmother, Mr. Savage, Tony and Lisa, are taking refuge. Tony and Mr. Savage argue about whether to save the other survivors outside or lock the doors and stay inside the school, with Mr. Savage winning the argument with a sudden military broadcast. Figuring it will be too dangerous to go home or to school, Anna and John go to the bowling alley, where they meet Steph and Chris, who have taken shelter there. Steph discovers an army evacuation is coming to the school, so the group plans to go there once it is safe. Steph kills the zombified janitor, which alerts a group of zombified bowlers to break in. The group kills them all after a bloody fight, and they realise that getting to their loved ones will be difficult.

The next morning, Anna, Steph, John and Chris wake up to find that the army has been zombified and no evacuation is coming. Regardless, they set off to the school to see if their loved ones are still alive. Nick—immensely enjoying the carnage—and his friends rescue the group from a horde of zombies and join them on their way to the school. Anna tells John that she still plans to travel despite everything that has happened. She also notes that he is her "best friend", implying she knows about his feelings but does not reciprocate. At the school, Savage fights to maintain authority as the others plan their evacuation.

The students are ambushed by zombies, which kill Nick's friends and bite John; he gets Anna to safety but sacrifices himself to distract the zombies. The survivors reach the school, where Savage has let the zombies in as a last-ditch measure of control. Anna and Nick split off to search for Tony while Steph and Chris look for his family and Steph's car keys. A group of zombies separates Nick and Anna. Chris finds Lisa, but his grandmother has already died of a heart attack. Steph, Chris and Lisa find the car keys in Savage's office, but Chris and Lisa are bitten while trying to escape.

Anna finds Savage in the auditorium, where he is using Tony as bait for the zombies. Anna frees Tony, but the two men fight. Savage falls to the zombies, and Tony reveals he's been bitten. Nick arrives in time for Anna to bid her father goodbye. They prepare for one last stand before Steph rescues them in her car. Anna finally leaves Little Haven to look for a safe place.

== Cast ==
- Ella Hunt as Anna
- Malcolm Cumming as John
- Sarah Swire as Steph
- Christopher Leveaux as Chris
- Ben Wiggins as Nick
- Marli Siu as Lisa
- Mark Benton as Tony
- Paul Kaye as Arthur Savage
- Calum Cormack as Zombie Santa
- Euan Bennet as Jake
- Sean Connor as Graham
- John Winchester as Tibbsy
- Janet Lawson as Mrs Hinzmann
- Kirsty Strain as Ms. Wright
- Jackie Bird as herself

== Production ==
=== Development ===
We were all up and coming, and we’d all essentially made these careers ourselves. So there was a hunger amongst all of us before Ryan got sick that this was a project we were all just really in love with. And after he got sick and we lost him, there was a feeling of unfinished business. We wanted closure from it, but really what we had to do was work out a way of acknowledging what Ryan had brought to it, his original idea and the concept we’d all wanted to bring to fruition, but also find a way forward.

— Screenwriter Alan McDonald on the development of the film following Ryan McHenry's death.

In 2009, whilst attending Edinburgh College of Art, Ryan McHenry came up with the idea for a 'zombie musical' short film, taking inspiration from High School Musical. In 2010, McHenry wrote and directed the short film in Dumfries High School, with his friends Naysun Alae-Carew as producer and Ryan Clachrie as production designer. In 2011, the short film titled Zombie Musical won Best Producer (Short Form) for Alaw-Carew at the British Academy Scotland New Talent Awards and received two additional nominations, including Best Director (McHenry) and Best Original Music (Toby Mottershead). Black Camel, a Glasgow-based production company, expressed interest in developing a feature-length film based on the short, with McHenry directing and Alae-Carew producing. McHenry was also hired to co-write the screenplay with Alan McDonald.

In 2013, development was halted when McHenry was diagnosed with osteosarcoma. After entering remission, he returned to work on the project with McDonald, now titled Anna and the Apocalypse. In May 2015, McHenry died from cancer, though Alae-Carew and McDonald continued to develop the project. The film was dedicated to McHenry, who died two years before the film's release.

=== Writing ===
By 2016, John McPhail had taken over as director with McDonald as sole screenwriter, though McHenry received credit as co-writer. McPhail was at first concerned about joining as director before production. In an interview with Entertainment Weekly, he said, "They’d all been doing this together and all of a sudden here I come in. I was nervous about it, but they welcomed me with open arms, they really, really did and that made everything nice and easy". Following McHenry's death, the initial draft of the film's script had a darker, cynical tone, which McDonald believed was due to McHenry's death. "The reason that draft was so dark was because I missed my friend... I guess, in the story that we were always telling and what ultimately became Ryan's story. Finding a way for us all to rediscover the joy of it was what I think kept us on target and ultimately created the movie that we’ve made now."

=== Music ===
In 2014, Roddy Hart was hired to write the film's songs, in collaboration with Tommy Reilly.

=== Filming ===
Principal photography took place over five weeks between 16 January and 22 February 2017 in and around the Inverclyde area near Glasgow. Production was primarily based at the former building of St. Stephen's High School at Southfield Avenue, Port Glasgow. The film was produced by Blazing Griffin Pictures, Black Camel Pictures, Parkhouse Pictures and Creative Scotland.

=== Inspirations ===
Director John McPhail said that Anna and the Apocalypse was influenced by the films West Side Story (1961), The Rocky Horror Picture Show (1975) and The Breakfast Club (1985), as well as the Buffy the Vampire Slayer musical episode "Once More, with Feeling". McPhail also said that the film includes "nods" to the zombie films Night of the Living Dead (1968), Dawn of the Dead (1978), The Evil Dead (1981), The Happiness of the Katakuris (2001) and Shaun of the Dead (2004). The crop tops and short shorts seen in the film were inspired by the costume design in the slasher film Sleepaway Camp (1983).

=== Soundtrack ===
A soundtrack consisting of 13 songs from the film was released on 23 November 2018.

The deleted song, "Which Side Are You On?", is featured only on the vinyl release and director's cut. Another deleted song, "Some Things Will Never Change", is present in the bonus features of the Blu-ray release.

Anna and the Apocalypse (Original Motion Picture Soundtrack)
No.	Title	Artist(s)	Length
1.	"Christmas Means Nothing Without You"	Shonagh Murray	3:17
2.	"Break Away"	Ella Hunt, Sarah Swire and Malcolm Cumming	3:59
3.	"Hollywood Ending"	Cast from Anna and the Apocalypse	3:32
4.	"The Fish Wrap"	Roddy Hart, Tommy Reilly and John McPhail	0:39
5.	"It's That Time of Year"	Marli Siu	2:48
6.	"Turning My Life Around"	Ella Hunt and Malcolm Cumming	3:50
7.	"Human Voice"	Cast from Anna and the Apocalypse	3:53
8.	"Soldier at War"	Ben Wiggins	3:10
9.	"Nothing's Gonna Stop Me Now"	Paul Kaye	2:48
10.	"Give Them a Show"	Ella Hunt and Paul Kaye	2:54
11.	"I Will Believe"	Ella Hunt and Mark Benton	3:43
12.	"What a Time to Be Alive"	Ryan Joseph Burns	2:09
13.	"What a Time to Be Alive (Orchestral Version)"	Cast from Anna and the Apocalypse	1:59

== Release ==
Anna and the Apocalypse had its world premiere in the Fantastic Fest on 22 September 2017. On 5 October 2017, the film held its European premiere at Sitges Film Festival in Catalonia, Spain.

On 10 January 2018, it was picked up for North and Latin American theatrical distribution by Orion Pictures. In the United States, the film received a limited theatrical release on 30 November 2018, with a nationwide expansion on 7 December.

=== Home media ===
The US theatrical release (93 minutes) was only given a digital release on 12 February 2019. It was made available on Hulu on 13 November 2019.

The film was released on region 2 DVD on 8 April 2019 by Vertigo Releasing through Kaleidoscope Home Entertainment. Second Sight Films released it in a region-free two-disc Blu-ray on 2 December 2019. Both the UK theatrical release (97 minutes) and the director's cut (108 minutes) are included in the set, the latter containing roughly ten minutes of footage absent from the theatrical version.

== Reception ==
=== Box office ===
In the United States and Canada, the film debuted to $52,588 from five cinemas, an average of $10,518.

=== Critical response ===
On review aggregator Rotten Tomatoes, the film holds an approval rating of 77% based on 127 reviews, with an average rating of 6.7/10. The website's critical consensus reads, "Anna and the Apocalypse finds fresh brains and a lot of heart in the crowded zombie genre—not to mention a fun genre mashup populated by rootable characters." On Metacritic, the film has a weighted average score of 63 out of 100, based on 26 critics, indicating "generally favourable reviews".

Dread Central gave it 5 out of 5 stars, saying that it's "not just a great movie but a great musical as well."

=== Accolades ===
Year	Awards	Category	Recipients	Result
2017	Rondo Hatton Classic Horror Awards	Best Independent Film	John McPhail	Nominated
2018	Edinburgh International Film Festival	Audience Award	John McPhail	Nominated
2018	British Academy Scotland Awards	Best Actress: Film	Ella Hunt	Nominated
2018	British Academy Scotland Awards	Best Feature Film	Naysun Alae-Carew, Nicholas Crum, Tracy Jarvis John McPhail, Alan McDonald	Nominated
2018	Toronto After Dark Film Festival			
2018	Toronto After Dark Film Festival	Best Feature Film: Gold	Anna and the Apocalypse	Won
2018	Toronto After Dark Film Festival	Best Ensemble Cast	Anna and the Apocalypse	Won
2018	Toronto After Dark Film Festival	Best Comedy	Anna and the Apocalypse	Won
2018	Toronto After Dark Film Festival	Best Music	Anna and the Apocalypse	Won
2018	Toronto After Dark Film Festival	Best Title Sequence	Anna and the Apocalypse	Won

== See also ==
- List of Christmas films
