= Chris Gayne =

- Born: Glasgow, Scotland
- Education: Edinburgh College of Art
- Occupation: Sound designer
- Years active: 2009–present

Chris Gayne is a Scottish BAFTA nominated sound designer, who studied at the Edinburgh College of Art. He is possibly best known for his work on the short film Anna which earned him a nomination for the best sound accolade at the 2015 British Academy Scotland New Talent Awards. He also worked on the film Tide which received a nomination in the best actor category at the same ceremony.

== Filmography ==
Year	Film	Director(s)	Notes
2007	The German Beer Munch	Jan Tipsy	Self
2008	Jan Hammered	S Fleeto	Self
2009	Kilt Man	Mark D. Ferguson	Assistant
2012	Across the Green	Maria Saarniit	Producer
2012	The Golden Chain	Ema Culik	Boom Operator
2012	Flashbulb	Kieran Gosney	Boom Operator
2013	ILGU: Smell Your Desire	Yulia Maximova	Boom Operator / Sound Mixer
2014	En tierra extraña	Iciar Bollain	Sound Recordist
2014	Anna	Christian McDonald	Sound Designer
2015	Tide	Gordon Napier	Boom Operator
2015	Astral	Chris Mul	Sound Recordist

== Awards and nominations ==
Year	Nominated Work	Award	Category	Result
2015	Anna	British Academy Scotland New Talent Awards	Best Sound	Nominated
