= Graham Fitzpatrick =

- Born: Edinburgh, Scotland
- Occupations: Film director, screenwriter
- Years active: 1999–present
- Notable work: Colours; Mum's Birthday

Graham Fitzpatrick is a Scottish film director and screenwriter.

== Biography ==
Graham Fitzpatrick was raised in the Edinburgh's Royston housing scheme, attending Ainslie Park High School and Broughton High School. His YTS traineeship at film workshop Pilton Video offered a basic grounding in film, documentary and drama, working across over sixty productions, including arts and charity films, short films, TV documentaries, mainly as an editor.

After directing several short films with Scottish Screen and BBC Scotland funding, Fitzpatrick studied screenwriting at Screen Academy Scotland developing the script for his first short film as writer and director. Entitled Mum's Birthday, the film tells the tale of Alex, a man who must overcome heartbreak to save his relationship with son Stephen on his wife's birthday.

As with previous work, non-professional actors were used in roles close to their everyday lives alongside professional actors. Young people from Edinburgh's care homes and housing schemes shared the screen with professionals such as Tam Dean Burn. Shot in December 2009 with financial backing from Creative Scotland, the film premiered at the Filmhouse in Edinburgh the following year. The film won Best Actor and Ensemble cast awards at Hollywood Reel Film Festival and Fitzpatrick was nominated in the 2011 British Academy Scotland New Talent Awards writer category.

In 2014, Fitzpatrick made another short film Colours, about an incarcerated gay teenager trying to survive behind bars, working in Scotland's HM Prison Polmont, with inmates given acting roles.

The film was shown at film festivals including Interfilm Berlin, Uppsala International Film Festival and Glasgow Film Festival. The British Film Institute included it in its top 11 films to see at the 11th London Short Film Festival. It also won Best UK Short award at East End Film Festival, and was nominated in the Best Short Film category at the 2014 British Academy Scotland Awards. Fitzpatrick of the nomination that "It is an incredible achievement for everyone involved in the film. I am personally delighted that Colours has been recognised in this way, it is a testament to the hard work put in by the entire team."

He is currently the creative manager of Screen Education Edinburgh. and working on his first feature film 'Make Her Proud'.

== Filmography ==
Year	Film	Credited as				Notes
Year	Film	director	screenWriter	Producer	Film Editor	Notes
1999	Happy Ever After				Yes	
2003	Then and Now				Yes	TV movie documentary
2006	Yesterday's News	Yes		Yes	Yes	Short Film
2007	Stolen Christmas	Yes		Yes	Yes	Short Film
2009	My Shadowlands			Yes		Short Film
2010	Mum's Birthday	Yes	Yes		Yes	Short Film
2010	Girl TM			Yes		Short
2012	Pen 2 Paper			Yes		TV movie documentary Executive Producer
2012	Our World			Yes		TV movie documentary Executive Producer
2012	Friendships			Yes		TV movie documentary Executive Producer
2013	Your Paintings			Yes		TV movie documentary Executive Producer
2013	Maths in Action	Yes	Yes	Yes		TV movie documentary Executive Producer
2013	Colours	Yes	Yes		Yes	Short Film
2015	The Still Heart Beating			Yes		Short Film; Associate Producer
2015	Concrete & Flowers	Yes	Yes	Yes		Short Film; Executive Producer

== Awards ==
Year	Nominated Work	Award	Category	Result
2010	Mum's Birthday	Los Angeles Movie Awards	Honorable Mention	
2011	Mum's Birthday	British Academy Scotland New Talent Awards	Best Writer	Nominated
2014	Colours	British Academy Scotland Awards	Best Short Film	Nominated
2014	Colours	Berlin Interfilm Festival	International Competition Award	Nominated
2014	Colours	East End Film Festival	Best UK Short Film	Won
2014	Colours	Glasgow Film Festival	Bill Douglas Award for International Short Film	Nominated
2014	Colours	Glasgow Film Festival	Scottish Short Film Award	Nominated
2014	Colours	Hollywood Reel Independent Film Festival	Award of Excellence	Won
2014	Colours	London Short Film Festival	Best Short Film	Nominated
2014	Colours	Tabor Film Festival	Best Fiction Film	Nominated
