= 2015 British Academy Scotland New Talent Awards =

- Date: 9 April 2015
- Site: The Arches (Glasgow); Scotland
- Hosted by: Muriel Gray

The 2015 British Academy Scotland New Talent Awards were held on 9 April 2015 at The Arches (Glasgow). Presented by BAFTA Scotland, the accolades honour the best upcoming talent in the field of film and television in Scotland. The nominees were announced on 24 March 2015. The ceremony was hosted by Muriel Gray.

== Winners and nominees ==
Winners are listed first and highlighted in boldface.

Best Actor	Best Actress
**Nick Ikunda - Happy Together**: Lewis Baxter - Tide; Darren Connell - Scot Squad	**Hannah Ord - Last Night in Edinburgh**: Georgia Raymond – A Love Divided; Ashley Smith – Scot Squad
Best Drama	Best Entertainment
**Patata Tortilla**: Last Night in Edinburgh; The Scribbler	**The Wee 'Hings**: The Cyclist; Middle Man
Best Writer	Best Editor
**Ben Sharrock - Patata Tortilla**: Gillian Park – Flotsam'; James Price - Dropping Off Michael	**Benjamin Cook - The Scribbler**: Ally Bhatia - Waitress; Artur Zaremba -Our Father
Best Factual	Best Camera / Photography
**Marty Goes To Hollywood – Martyn Robertson, Ian Bustard**: After The Crash - Tomasz Motyka; Late Night in Glasgow – Kurosh Kani, Dayna Baptie, Louise Dawson	**Steven Cameron Ferguson - Sick**: Ian Forbes – Seahorse; Andrew O'Connor – The Still Heart Beating
Best Sound	Best Composer
**Kevin Walls – Identical**: Richy Carey - Phonic Imagery; Chris Gayne – Anna	**Richy Carey - Lichtspiel: Opus I**: Amin Keshmiri – The Scribbler; Alia E. Torrie – When the Tide Comes In
Best Design	Best Animation
**Anthony Devine - Boat**: Marina Maclean - Waitress; Frances Collier - Whistle My Lad	**Domestic Appliances - Lewis Firth Bolton**: Mitigating Circumstances - Kieran Duncan, Tom Paxton, Steph Flynn, Phillip Vaughan; Separate Lives - Mayra Hernandez Rios, Jared Taylor, Aleksandra Kovač
Best Game
**Seek - Vimarsh Raina, Amy Stevens, Jessica Hider, Christopher Dickson**: Leila And The Little Folk - Bruce Lomond; Revenant - Stuart Tait, Ellen Brown, Mark Thompson, Vince Finlayson

=== Special Award for New Work ===
Steven Cameron Ferguson - Sick

== See also ==
- 2015 British Academy Scotland Awards
