= Kevin Walls =

Scottish film director

- Education: Glasgow School of Art
- Occupation: Film Director
- Years active: 2014–present

Kevin Walls is a Scottish film director. He graduated from the Glasgow School of Art and is probably best known for the short film Identical in which he won the Best Sound accolade at the 2015 edition of the British Academy Scotland New Talent Awards.

== Filmography ==
Year	Film	Credited as				Additional Roles	Notes
Year	Film	Director	Cinematographer	ScreenWriter	Sound	Additional Roles	Notes
2014	Identical	Yes		Yes	Yes	Producer	Short Film
2016	Rex Raven				Yes		Short Film
2016	Nine Iron				Yes		Short Film
2017	Confessions of the Paparazzi				Yes		TV movie documentary
2017	Money for Nothing				Yes		TV series
2017	No Song to Sing				Yes		Short
2017	Celebrity Money for Nothing				Yes		TV series
2018	Coffee Coffee		Yes				Short Film
2019	Death of a Vlogger		Yes				Feature Film
2019	When Abbie Met Emmy	Yes					Short Film
2021	The Found Footage Phenomenon		Yes				Documentary Feature

== Awards and nominations ==
Year	Nominated Work	Award	Category	Result
2015	Identical	British Academy Scotland New Talent Awards	Best Sound	Won
