= Andrew Lanni =

- Born: Kirkwall, Orkney, Scotland
- Education: Royal Conservatoire of Scotland
- Occupation: Film producer
- Years active: 2010–present
- Notable work: Where Do We Go From Here?; Just Say Hi; V for Visa

Andrew Lanni is a Scottish Film producer from Kirkwall in Orkney. He has also worked on various films as an assistant director.

== Life and career ==
Andrew Lanni studied Digital Film & Television at the Royal Conservatoire of Scotland. During his time here, he worked as a producer on the film The Taxidermist which was later nominated for the Best Fiction accolade at the 2012 British Academy Scotland New Talent Awards. It also was nominated again for the Best Fiction accolade at the student awards ceremony run by the Royal Television Society.

In 2013, he was reunited with his fellow students John McPhail and Tyler Collins for the short film Notes in which Lanni was the producer. Together with McPhail, the pair pulled in a lot of favour from friends and family in order to gain equipment, locations and crew to make the film. Notes was the first part of a trilogy of short comedy films with V for Visa and Doug & Steve's Big Holy Adventure completing the series in the same year. The films were positively received by critics with V for Visa being selected to have its North American premiere at Robert De Niro's TriBeCa Film Centre in New York as part of the Bootleg Film Festival. The film went on to win the Best film accolade at the festival.

During the filming of the comedy trilogy, Lanni agreed to produce a short 3 minute film called Just Say Hi to enter into the 2013 edition of the Virgin Media Shorts Competition. The film, written and directed by McPhail, tells the story of a blossoming romance between a boy and a girl who meet every morning at a bus stop. The film made it through to the top 13 out of a short list of 250 films. Lanni and the production team were presented with the awards at a ceremony in London where they picked up 2 out of the 3 awards of the evening which included £5,000 in film funding with mentoring from the British Film Institute and a voucher for £5,000 to spend on Nikon Equipment. The film was later picked up by the Très Court International Film Festival where it was screened in over 100 cities in 23 countries.

In 2014, Lanni reunited with McPhail once again to produce the feature film Where Do We Go From Here?. The film, which raised £10,630 on Indegogo, was filmed in just 16 days. In 2015, the film entered the festival circuit and was screened in late October at the Sydney Indie Film Festival where it was nominated for 7 awards. The film picked up three awards at the festival for Best Score, Best Supporting Actress and Best Film. In the same year, Lanni was hired as the second assistant director for the film Con Men which was written and directed by R. Paul Wilson.

== Filmography ==
Year	Film	Credited as		Notes
Year	Film	Producer	Assistant Director	Notes
2010	Paperskin	Yes		Executive Producer
2011	I Alive	Yes		
2011	The Taxidermist	Yes		
2013	Waterloo Road		Yes	Third Assistant Director; 1 episode
2013	Tipping in the Breeze	Yes		
2013	Notes	Yes		
2013	Just Say Hi	Yes	Yes	Assistant Director
2013	V for Visa	Yes	Yes	Assistant Director
2015	Con Men		Yes	Second Assistant Director
2015	Stalactites		Yes	Second Assistant Director
2015	Where Do We Go From Here?	Yes	Yes	Second Assistant Director

== Awards ==
Year	Nominated Work	Awards	Category	Result
2012	The Taxidermist	British Academy Scotland New Talent Awards	Best Fiction (Shared with Charlotte Carden)	Nominated
2014	The Taxidermist	Royal Television Society	Best Fiction (Shared with Charlotte Carden)	Nominated
2015	Where Do We Go From Here?	Sydney Indie Film Festival	Best Film (Shared with John McPhail and Lauren Lamarr)	Won
