= The Greyness of Autumn =

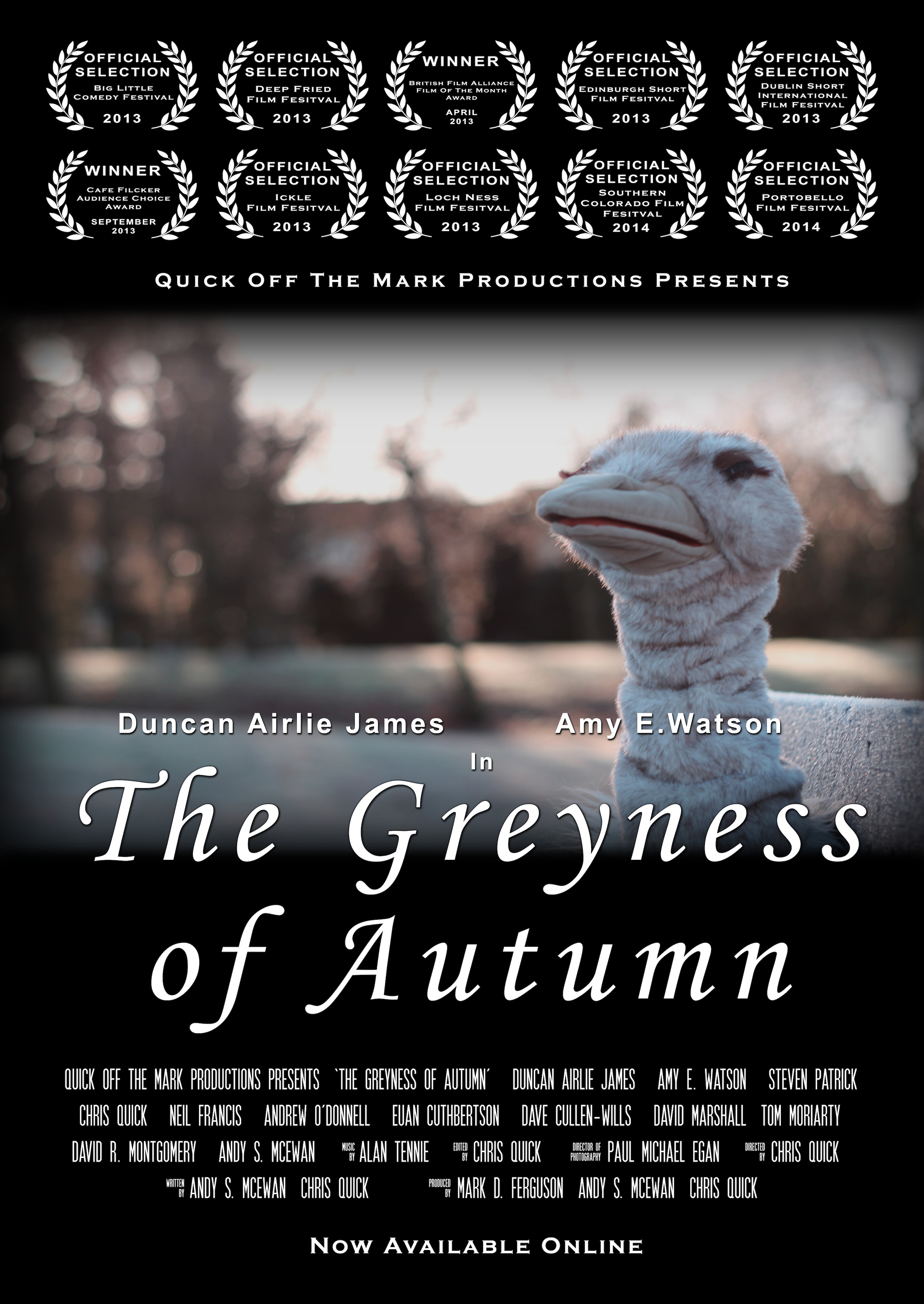
- Directed by: Chris Quick
- Written by: Chris Quick; Andy S. McEwan
- Produced by: Chris Quick; Mark D. Ferguson; Andy S. McEwan
- Starring: Duncan Airlie James; Amy E Watson; Steven Patrick; Chris Quick; Neil Francis
- Cinematography: Paul Michael Egan
- Edited by: Chris Quick
- Music by: Alan Tennie
- Production company: Quick Off The Mark Productions
- Release date: 28 December 2012
- Running time: 14 minutes
- Country: United Kingdom
- Language: English

The Greyness of Autumn is a short black comedy film following the life of Danny McGuire, an ostrich living in Glasgow. The film was produced by Quick Off The Mark Productions and marked the directorial debut for Chris Quick.

== Plot ==
Danny McGuire is an ostrich who works for a call centre selling loft insulation. His life seems to be relatively stable with a decent job and a girlfriend of many years. However, on the first day of autumn, Dannys life is turned upside down when he learns that his job is being outsourced to India. That very same night, his girlfriend tells him that she has met another man and is leaving him. Distraught by the events of the day, Danny turns to his flatmate Nelson (a cornflake eating monkey) at the local pub but their conversation is cut short when a fight breaks about between the pub landlord Barry and Nelson. Danny slips away unnoticed from the bar and heads home to drown his sorrows. Upon his way home, Danny unexpectedly walks into the path of a mugger who holds him at knifepoint demanding his shoes. Despite attempts to inform the mugger that he has no shoes, Danny is knocked out by a punch to the face.

After reflecting on recent events over a bottle of whiskey, Danny soon comes to realise that he can't escape the vicious cycle known as 'The Greyness of Autumn' and realises that society will never accept him for being different and that Danny could only be free if he ended his life.

== Main cast ==
- Duncan Airlie James as Danny McGuire (Voice)
- Amy E Watson as Katie
- Steven Patrick as Mr Jenkins
- Chris Quick as Nelson (Voice)
- Neil Francis as Barry
- Andrew O'Donnell as Jimmy Guinness
- Euan Cuthbertson as The Interviewer
- Dave Cullen-Wills as The Mugger
- Tom Moriarty as Mr Harrison
- David R. Montgomery as The Restaurant Manager
- David Marshall as Kyle
- Andy S. McEwan as The Office Worker

== Release and reception ==
The film was released on 28 December 2012 and had its first public screening in April 2013 at the Centre for Contemporary Arts in Glasgow where it was shown alongside The Priest with Two Guns by Rodney Reynolds. Both films coincidentally had Duncan Airlie James in the leading role.

Throughout 2013, the film appeared at a number of festivals in the United Kingdom including the Edinburgh Short Film Festival and the Deep Fried Film Festival. Internationally, the film was screened in various countries including the United States where it featured in the Big Little Comedy Festival. It was also shown at the Dublin Short Film & Music Festival in Ireland.

The Greyness of Autumn received highly positive reviews from critics. In the United Kingdom, MovieScramble said:

"The fact that there are more than a few memorable moments in the film is a testament to the quality of the writing. A very nicely paced, bone dry comedy that is a splendid way to spend fourteen minutes."

The London Film Review and ScreenCritix both gave the film 4 out of 5 stars with Edmond Guy adding:

"The director did a fantastic job of bringing human elements to a prop. A feat in itself."

Internationally, the film received high praise with Mark Bell of Film Threat in the United States saying:

"The Greyness of Autumn is an odd duck of a film. On the one hand, it is a bleak, dry, downward spiral for Danny. On the other hand, it’s all that, but it’s happening to an ostrich puppet. Which is what makes this entertaining, honestly, because if it was just another dramatic story about a guy whose life goes to shit, it wouldn’t be that interesting".

Canadian review site Pretty Clever Films wrote:

"Quick is alarmingly funny. The film serves up a copious amount of black comedy that has a great WTF-factor. The film is intriguing simply because it’s so strange."

In 2014, the film returned to the festival circuit appearing in the Southern Colorado Film Festival and the Portobello Film Festival. In November, the film screened at the Barossa Film Festival in South Australia. In 2015, the film returned to Australia for the People of Passion Festival where it picked up the Best Short Comedy accolade.

== Awards ==
Year	Awards	Category	Recipient(s)	Result
2013	British Filmmakers Alliance	Best British Film of the Month	Chris Quick, Andy S. McEwan, Mark D. Ferguson	Won
2015	People of Passion Film Festival	Best Short Comedy Film	Chris Quick, Andy S. McEwan, Mark D. Ferguson	Won

== Eurovision ==
In 2013, the producers of the film considered a bid for the character Nelson to represent the United Kingdom at the 2014 edition of the Eurovision Song Contest. A support page was launched on Facebook but eventually no song materialised and the bid was abandoned.

== Autumn Never Dies ==
On 12 December 2014, it was announced on the website of Quick Off The Mark Productions that writing had begun on a possible sequel to The Greyness of Autumn entitled Autumn Never Dies. A crowd funding campaign was launched on Kickstarter on 17 August 2015 to raise funds for the production and lasted for 30 days. The campaign successfully raised £1,505 from 44 backers including former Gamesmaster host Dominik Diamond. The film released in 2020.
