= Naysun Alae-Carew =

Scottish film producer

- Occupation: Film producer
- Years active: 2009–present
- Notable work: Anna and the Apocalypse; Zombie Musical

Naysun Alae-Carew is a Scottish film producer and editor. He is best known for the film, Anna and the Apocalypse which was nominated for the Best Feature Film accolade at the 2018 British Academy Scotland Awards. The film was based on the short film Zombie Musical which earned him the Beat Producer: Short Form accolade at the 2011 British Academy Scotland New Talent Awards. He is a company director of Blazing Griffin which makes independent film and video games including the remastered version of The Ship. He attended St Joseph's College in Dumfries

== Filmography ==
Year	Film	Credited as		Additional roles	Notes
Year	Film	Film editor	Producer	Additional roles	Notes
2009	Time, Care and Attention	Yes	Yes	Director, writer	
2010	Join the Dots			Second assistant director	
2011	Dead Ringer			Cinematography	B Camera
2011	Zombie Musical	Yes	Yes		
2012	One Night in Sutherland Hill	Yes	Yes		
2012	Outpost: Black Sun			Assistant to the producers	
2013	Outpost: Rise of the Spetsnaz	Yes		Assistant to the producers	
2013	Sunshine on Leith			Assistant to the producers	
2013	Toast	Yes			
2014	Hole	Yes	Yes		
2015	City	Yes	Yes		
2017	Anna and the Apocalypse		Yes		
2017	Exodus 21:24		Yes		
2017	Natalie		Yes		Executive producer
2022	Book of Love		Yes		
2023	Dear David		Yes		

== Awards and nominations ==
Year	Nominated Work	Award	Category	Result
2011	Zombie Musical	British Academy Scotland New Talent Awards	Best Producer: Short Form	Won
2018	Anna and the Apocalypse	British Academy Scotland Awards	Best Feature Film (Shared with Nicholas Crum, Tracy Jarvis John McPhail and Alan McDonald)	Nominated

== See also ==
- Anna and the Apocalypse
