= Graeme McGeagh =

Scottish screenwriter and actor

- Born: Kirkintilloch, Scotland
- Occupations: Screenwriter, actor
- Years active: 2011–present
- Notable work: A Practical Guide to a Spectacular Suicide; The Big Slick

Graeme McGeagh is a Scottish screenwriter and actor. He is possibly best known for co-writing and playing the leading role of Tom Collins in the film A Practical Guide to a Spectacular Suicide.

== Life and career ==
Born in Kirkintilloch in Scotland, McGeagh formed a close film partnership with childhood friends Graham Hughes and Keith Grantham. In 2011, the trio writing their first film The Big Slick. The feature-length comedy film, which also starred the trio in acting roles, tells the story of six young guys whose efforts to spend a quiet night in, quickly spiral out of control. The film was an overwhelming success and earned McGeagh, Hughes and Grantham a nomination for best achievement in writing at the 2011 British Academy Scotland New Talent Awards. The trio were triumphant and took home the accolade at the ceremony which was held at the Glasgow Film Theatre on 11 March 2011.

Following the success of The Big Slick, McGeagh reunited with Hughes and Grantham in 2013 to write their next feature film. Work began later that year on A Practical Guide to a Spectacular Suicide, a story about a man named Tom Collins whose string of suicide attempts leads him to plan what he dubs will be his own 'spectacular suicide'. With the film written, McGeagh was approached to play the lead role which he accepted. Director Graham Hughes, later said 'I think he's a talent—and was the right guy for the part.'

The film was later released in 2014 and was well received both at home and abroad. Its first festival appearance was at the Cinequest Film Festival in California, and in the UK the film premiered at the Edinburgh International Film Festival. A Practical Guide to a Spectacular Suicide earned McGeagh a 2nd Bafta nomination at the 2014 British Academy Scotland New Talent Awards for Best Acting Performance.

== Filmography ==
Year	Film	Credited as				Notes
Year	Film	Writer	Producer	Actor	Role	Notes
2011	The Big Slick	Yes	Yes	Yes	Gavin	Feature Film; Debut as Writer, Actor & Producer
2014	A Practical Guide to a Spectacular Suicide	Yes	Yes	Yes	Tom Collins	Feature Film
2015	Christmas Eve of the Dead	Yes				

== Awards ==
Year	Nominated Work	Awards	Category	Result
2011	The Big Slick	British Academy Scotland New Talent Awards	Best Writer (Shared with Graham Hughes and Keith Grantham)	Won
2014	A Practical Guide to a Spectacular Suicide	British Academy Scotland New Talent Awards	Best Actor	Nominated
