= Ainslie Park High School =

Former secondary school in Scotland

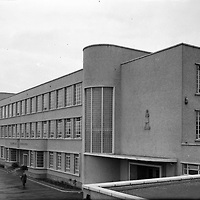
- main entrance area

Location
- 347A Pilton Avenue; East Pilton, Edinburgh; 55°58′18.13″N 3°14′10.79″W

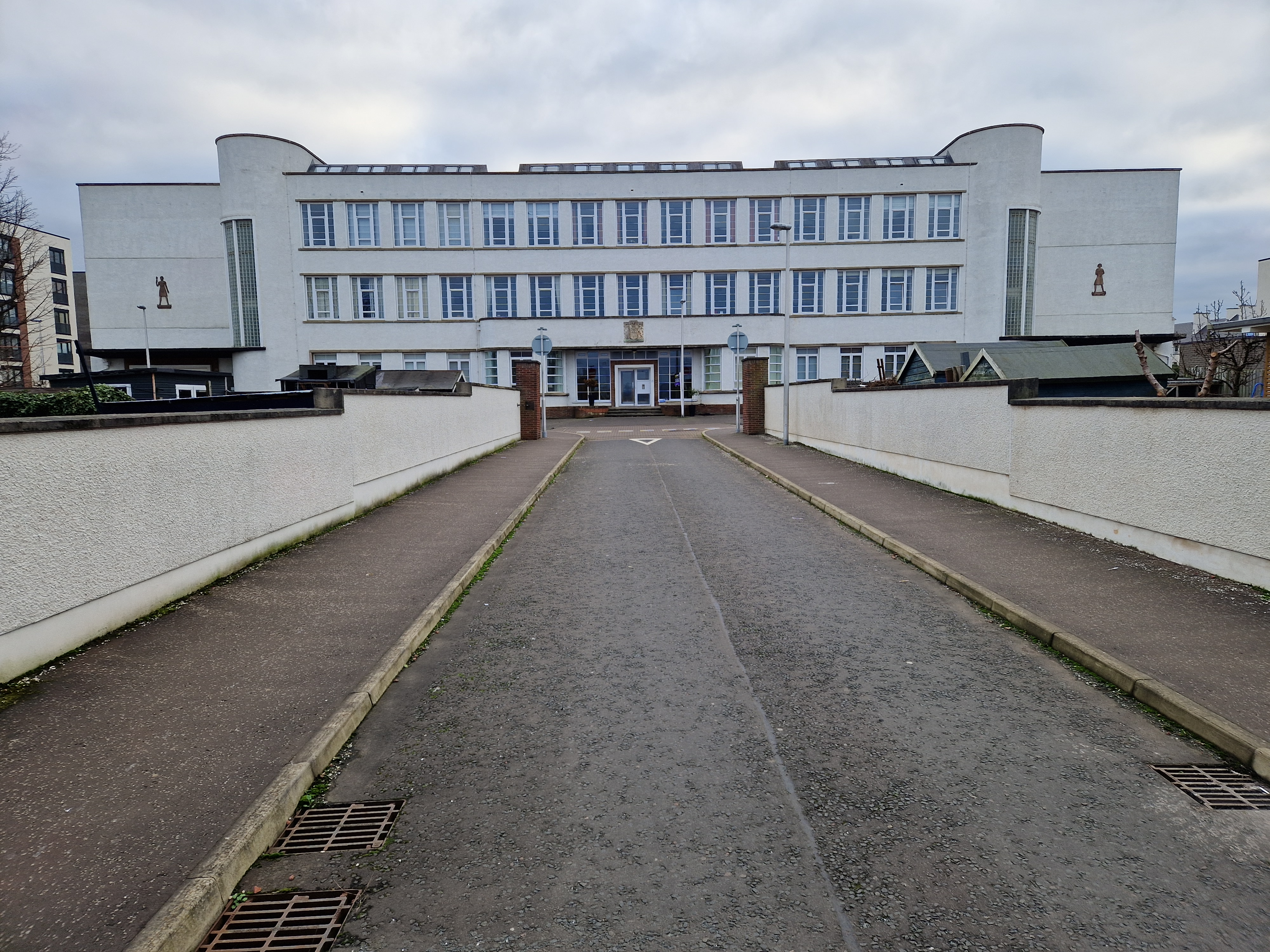
Remains of the school in 2025

Ainslie Park High School was a state secondary school in East Pilton, Edinburgh, Scotland. The building was deemed surplus to requirements and in the 2000s it was converted into housing with the facade retained.

== History ==
The school was designed by James Stewart Johnston in the mid-1930s, but building work was delayed until after World War II and construction started in 1949. The school was originally to be called Pilton Intermediate School. From its opening in 1948 until 1965 it was a junior secondary school, meaning pupils left at the end of their third academic year. If they wished to sit O-grade examinations they had to move on to another school. The 1965/66 academic year saw the school attain senior secondary status, thereby allowing pupils to remain into fourth year to sit O-grade exams. The school subsequently expanded the academic syllabus to offer Higher examinations. The school colours were red and gold and the badge was a golden dolphin on a red background.

The first headmaster was Norman Murchison, who was also a well known commentator on post-war education; in 1968 he delivered the 14th Charles Russell memorial lecture on the subject of 'Some social aspects of modern education'. He was also involved in numerous other debates, including on the propensity for young Scots to go abroad after the war and on the delinquency level of children in early 1950. He was made the first Citizen Of The Year for the City of Edinburgh, and a lecture theatre was named in his honour at the University of Edinburgh's King's Buildings campus. He retired in June 1968 and was succeeded by Norman Chalmers.

The opening of Craigroyston Community High School and the falling birth rate since the late 1960s meant that Ainslie Park was no longer viable as a secondary school, and the building became the North Campus for Edinburgh's Telford College. The axe finally fell on Ainslie Park in 1991.

A full planning application to develop the site was submitted by Miller Homes on 21 March 2007 and was granted by the City of Edinburgh Council. The main building was the original building designed by J.S. Johnston in the 1930s' Art Deco style and was listed under category B. It was to be converted into flats while the rest was to be new build, but Miller Homes successfully appealed under test d: The repair of the building is not economically viable, and the old main building was demolished; only its façade has been retained.

The building was deemed surplus to requirements and in the 2000s it was converted into housing with the facade retained.

=== 1971 tragedy ===
On 21–22 November 1971 five members of a mountaineering club at Ainslie Park School and an 18-year-old trainee instructor from Newcastle-under-Lyme died in a blizzard while trying to walk from Cairn Gorm to Corrour Bothy. A party of 14 children led by 23-year-old Ben Beattie, who was Ainslie Park's outdoor instructor, and his 21-year-old girlfriend Catherine Davidson, set out for Lagganlia to be met by a local instructor called Sheila Sutherland. The party then split into two with Beattie taking one group and Davidson and Sutherland taking the other. The latter group of six children struggled to reach their destination (the Corrour Bothy) and decided to settle for the night in a snow hole. Only two members of the party survived — instructor Catherine Davidson and pupil Raymond Leslie. The members of the party who died were: Sheila Sunderland the local instructor, Carol Bertram (aged 16), Susan Byrne (15), Lorraine Dick (15), William Kerr (15) and Diane Dudgeon (15). As of 2021 it stands as the UK's worst mountaineering disaster.

Such was the public concern that on 23 November 1971, the day after the Cairngorm Plateau disaster, Gordon Campbell, the Secretary of State for Scotland announced in the House of Commons that the Lord Advocate had decided to institute a public inquiry under the Fatal Accidents and Sudden Deaths Inquiry (Scotland) Act 1906.

== Notable alumni ==
- Ron Brown MP
- Frank Doran MP
- Irvine Welsh, writer
- Bert Jansch, musician
- David Rennie, footballer
- Willie Stevenson, footballer
- Graham Fitzpatrick film director, screenwriter

== Notable former teachers ==
- Terry Christie, football manager
