= A Practical Guide to a Spectacular Suicide =

- Directed by: Graham Hughes
- Written by: Keith Grantham; Graham Hughes; Graeme McGeagh
- Produced by: Graeme McGeagh; Kirsty Hutton; Graham Hughes; Keith Grantham
- Starring: Graeme McGeagh; Patrick O'Brien; Annabel Logan; Ray Crofter; Amanda Marment; Mandy Bhari; Alan Robertson Snr
- Cinematography: Steven Donnelly
- Edited by: Graham Hughes
- Release date: 2014
- Running time: 83 minutes
- Country: Scotland
- Language: English

A Practical Guide to a Spectacular Suicide is a 2014 Scottish micro-budget dark comedy film by Graham Hughes. It centres on Tom (Graeme McGeagh), a young man who is determined to kill himself. The film was nominated for awards at the Edinburgh International Film Festival and by BAFTA Scotland in 2014.

== Plot ==
After a number of suicide attempts, Tom comes to the conclusion that he must research and plan for a "spectacular" attempt at ending his life. Having been ordered into counselling by a judge following a previous attempt on his life, Tom meets fellow patient Eve (Annabel Logan) and acerbic therapist Dr Watson (Patrick O’Brien), as well as the grumpy Mr Neilsen (Ray Crofter), who Tom has been ordered to help as part of a community service order. As he plans for his spectacular suicide, Tom forms relationships with Eve, Dr Watson and Mr Neilsen, leading him to examine and question his motives for wanting to end his own life.

== Production ==
A Practical Guide to a Spectacular Suicide was shot over 12 days and cost £3,000 to make, raised through crowdfunding. It was filmed in and around Glasgow, Stirling and Ayrshire in Scotland.

== Release ==
The film had its world premiere at Cinequest Film Festival in 2014, followed by a UK premiere at the Edinburgh International Film Festival later that year.

Year	Film Festival	Award	Achievement
2014	BAFTA Scotland New Talent	Fiction (Graham Hughes/Kirsty Hutton)	Nominated
2014	BAFTA Scotland New Talent	Actor (Graeme McGeagh)	Nominated
2014	Cinequest Film Festival	Best Director	Nominated
2014	Deep Fried Film Festival	Best Comedy	Won
2014	Edinburgh International Film Festival	Best British Feature	Nominated
