= Book of Love (2022 film) =

Film by Analeine Cal y Mayor

- UK release poster
- Directed by: Analeine Cal y Mayor
- Written by: David Quantick; Analeine Cal y Mayor
- Produced by: Michael Knowles; Naysun Alae-Carew; Allan Niblo; Richard Alan Reid; Nick Spicer; Maxime Cottray
- Starring: Sam Claflin; Verónica Echegui; Horacio Villalobos; Fernando Becerril; Ruy Gaytan; Horacio García Rojas; Lucy Punch
- Cinematography: Gerardo Barroso Alcalá
- Edited by: Berny McGurk; Mark Thornton
- Music by: Ian Livingstone
- Production companies: XYZ Films; Vertigo Films; Sky; North of Watford; Blazing Griffin; BuzzFeed Studios
- Distributed by: Amazon Prime Video (United States); Sky Cinema (United Kingdom); Zima Entertainment (Mexico)
- Release dates: 6 January 2022 (Ukraine and United Arab Emirates); 4 February 2022 (United States); 12 February 2022 (United Kingdom); 21 April 2022 (Mexico)
- Running time: 106 minutes
- Countries: United States; United Kingdom; Mexico
- Languages: English; Spanish
- Box office: $398,976

Book of Love is a 2022 romantic comedy film directed by Analeine Cal y Mayor, who co-wrote the screenplay with David Quantick. It stars Sam Claflin and Verónica Echegui. An international co-production of the United States, the United Kingdom and Mexico, the film was released in the United States on Amazon Prime Video on 4 February 2022, in the United Kingdom on Sky Cinema on 12 February and theatrically in Mexico on 21 April.

== Plot ==
Henry Copper is a traditional, uptight English author of romance stories, that focus on love, but are restrained in terms of passion. His one published novel is not selling, and he is somewhat at a loss as what to do. However, his publisher Jen contacts him to tell him that his book is now in fact selling—in one country, Mexico, and that he needs to go there to push the book on a three-city book signing tour.

Quickly getting his things together, he flies the next day to be met by the translator of the book, Maria, who takes him on a tour in her car with the Mexican publisher Pedro and her son and grandfather. Henry attends the first book signing, which is incredibly popular, but Henry is confused about people's reactions, and because everyone is talking about sex. Despite her best efforts to mislead him, including mistranslating people's conversation to tone down the content, Henry finds out that Maria has not just translated the book; she has re-written it completely, transforming it into a passionate sexy romance novel, which is why it is so popular.

Henry is distressed, but has to continue with the book tour. As time goes by, he comes to grip with the fact the book is in fact better with her contribution, while she has to deal with the fact that his name is also contributing to the book's success. A romance grows between the two, though Antonio, Maria's ex, tries to interfere. The publisher contacts Henry and tells him that he has 10 weeks to complete a new book, and he needs to work with Maria.

The two work together, and eventually have a romantic night together. However, after some interference from Antonio, Henry becomes jealous and returns to England. Henry eventually realizes he loves Maria, and returns to a book signing event in Mexico. He has arranged for both their names to be on the cover, so that now she is billed as co-author. At the book signing event, despite some unsuccessful interference from the passionate Antonio, Henry reveals his true feelings for her, and their relationship is re-kindled. The film finishes with Maria becoming an author in her own right, now writing her own novels, although they are still together.

== Cast ==
- Sam Claflin as Henry Copper
- Verónica Echegui as Maria Rodríguez
- Lucy Punch as Jen
- Horacio García Rojas as Antonio
- Horacio Villalobos as Pedro
- Laura de Ita as Rosa
- Fernando Becerril as Max Rodríguez
- Ruy Gaytan as host
- Giovani Florido as Miguel
- Remmie Milner as bookshop owner

== Production ==
In February 2021, it was announced that Sam Claflin and Verónica Echegui would star in the romantic comedy film Book of Love, with Analeine Cal y Mayor directing from a script by David Quantick. The film was produced by Michael Knowles for North of Watford Films, Naysun Alae-Carew for Blazing Griffin, Allan Niblo for Vertigo Films, Nick Spicer and Maxime Cottray for XYZ Films, and Richard Alan Reid for BuzzFeed Studios.

Principal photography took place from March to April 2021 in San Cristóbal de las Casas, Palenque and Tuxtla Gutiérrez, in the Mexican state of Chiapas, amid the COVID-19 pandemic. Filming was originally set to take place in the Canary Islands, Spain, but due to COVID-19 travel restrictions, Claflin and the British producers were unable to enter the country, so production relocated to Mexico.

== Release ==
Book of Love was first released theatrically in Ukraine and the United Arab Emirates on 6 January 2022. The film was released in the United States and Canada on Amazon Prime Video on 4 February 2022, and in the United Kingdom on Sky Cinema on 12 February. In Mexico, it was released theatrically on 21 April 2022 by Zima Entertainment.

== Reception ==
On the review aggregator website Rotten Tomatoes, the film holds an approval rating of 50% based on 42 reviews, with an average rating of 5.4/10. The website's critics consensus reads, "The sweet promise of Book of Love's fun premise is left frustratingly unfulfilled, although it may be fluffy enough to tickle the fancies of undemanding rom-com fans." Metacritic, which uses a weighted average, assigned the film a score of 44 out of 100, based on 5 critics, indicating "mixed or average" reviews.

Tara Bennett of Paste rated the film 7.9 out of 10 and wrote that "it's the charming chemistry of Sam Claflin and Verónica Echegui that makes director Analeine Cal y Mayor's work a sweet confection to enjoy", dubbing the film "a surprising mix of sweet and salty, silly and sincere, that earns those coveted rom-com sighs." Tomris Laffly of Variety stated, "While Analeine Cal y Mayor's amiable romp doesn't master the screwball language, it still worthily celebrates the art of sex and romance through a charming tale of opposites". James Croot of Stuff opined, "What could have been a cringeworthy cross-cultural comedy is actually a surprisingly entertaining romp", adding that "Claflin and Echegui winningly sell the premise and punchlines."

Gary Goldstein of the Los Angeles Times praised the performances of Claflin and Echegui and wrote, "Despite being often preposterous, the cross-cultural comedy Book of Love is an entertaining watch. Just don't scratch even the slightest bit beneath its glossy, super-contrived surface." James Verniere of the Boston Herald graded the film a B+ and stated, "It's not Bridget Jones's Diary. But it's more exotic, and it's better than that cloying piece of nonsense Me Before You (2016) that Claflin made with Emilia Clarke."

Christy Lemire of RogerEbert.com awarded the film one-and-a-half out of four stars, criticising the lack of chemistry between Claflin and Echegui and stating, "The film is clearly sweet and well-intentioned, but [...] Analeine Cal y Mayor has trouble transcending the confines of her meager budget, which leaves Book of Love looking and sounding distractingly chintzy." Natalia Winkelman of The New York Times criticised Claflin's performance and commented that "there is something tired and clichéd about a Mexican woman's being deputed to help a British fuddy-duddy embrace narrative spice." Rating the film one out of five stars, Benjamin Lee of The Guardian concluded, "Romantic comedies are expected to be contrived and far-fetched – it's a genre that allows for a lot of exceptions – but they really shouldn't be this dull."

In October 2022, Book of Love won the Imagen Award for Best Primetime Program – Special or Movie.
