= Notes (film) =

- Film poster
- Directed by: John McPhail
- Written by: John McPhail; Calum Weir
- Produced by: John McPhail; Andrew Lanni
- Starring: EmmaClaire Brightlyn; Tyler Collins; Lynn Murray; Jim Sweeney
- Cinematography: Calum Weir
- Edited by: Stuart Doherty
- Music by: Tyler Collins
- Production company: Worrying Drake Productions
- Release date: 7 June 2013
- Running time: 10 minutes
- Country: United Kingdom
- Language: English

Notes is a short romantic comedy film about a pair of roommates whose relationship develops through a series of post it notes. Notes marked the first installment of a trilogy of short films by Worrying Drake Productions. The film was also the directorial debut for John McPhail.

== Plot ==
Adam (Tyler Collin) has just moved into a new flat with Abi (EmmaClaire Brightlyn) who is a nurse. The pair have never met and as a result of their conflicting sleep patterns the pair communicate via post it notes. What starts off as a complaint over their preferred types of coffee soon develops into flirtatious messages.

== Main cast ==
- EmmaClaire Brightlyn as Abi
- Tyler Collins as Adam
- Ailsa Courtney as the Cleaner
- Lynn Murray as Gemma
- Dawn Robertson as Sarah
- Jim Sweeney as the Landlord

== Release and reception ==
Notes was released on 7 June 2013 and was positively received by critics. Thomas Simpson of MovieScramble wrote:

"In less than 10 minutes, McPhail has achieved what many feature films can not. A touching romance with a genuine humour to stop it from being too schmaltzy."

The film went on to appear in many domestic and international film festivals and picked up the Best Film accolade at the Edinburgh Bootleg Film Festival, as well as the audience award at the Palme Dewar festival in Aberfeldy.

== Awards ==
| Year | Awards | Category | Recipient(s) | Result |
|---|---|---|---|---|
| 2013 | Bootleg Film Festival Edinburgh | Best Scottish Film | John McPhail | Won |
| 2013 | We Like 'Em Short Film Festival | Best Actor | Tyler Collins | Won |
| 2013 | Roughcut | Audience Choice Award | John McPhail, Andrew Lanni | Won |
| 2013 | Aberfeldy Film Festival | Palme-Dewar Audience Choice Award | John McPhail, Andrew Lanni | Won |
| 2014 | Ayr International Film Festival | Best Director | John McPhail | Won |
| 2014 | Ayr International Film Festival | Audience Choice Award | John McPhail, Andrew Lanni | Won |
| 2015 | Fife Indiependent Film Expo | Best Editing | Stuart Doherty | Won |
