= Just Say Hi =

- Directed by: John McPhail
- Written by: John McPhail
- Produced by: Andrew Lanni
- Starring: Tyler Collins; Natalie Wallace; John McPhail; John Young
- Cinematography: John Young
- Edited by: John McPhail
- Production company: Worrying Drake Productions
- Release date: 1 July 2013
- Running time: 3 minutes
- Country: United Kingdom
- Language: English

Just Say Hi is a short 2013 British romantic comedy film about a blossoming romance between a boy and a girl who meet every morning at a bus stop.

== Main cast ==
- Tyler Collins as the Boy
- Natalie Wallace as the Girl
- John McPhail as Norbert
- John Young as Wonder Woman

== Release and reception ==
Just Say Hi was released on 1 July 2013 and was positively received by critics. Amber Wilkinson of Eye for Film wrote:

"Even in this limited environment, McPhail finds unexpected ways to generate comedy while also giving the girl and the boy distinctive characters, which is no mean feat considering there is only one line of dialogue."

Robbie Collins of the Daily Telegraph described the film as:

"One of the sweetest payoffs I’ve seen in any rom-com this year."

The film's first festival encounter was the Virgin Media Short competition run by Virgin Media. The film made it through to the final where it competed with 12 other short films which were judged by a panel which included actor David Tennant, Shane Meadows and film critic James King. The film was a hit with the judges and the audience at home winning 2 out of the 3 awards available making McPhail the only director in the competition's history to win multiple awards. The production team were presented with the awards at a ceremony in London which included £5,000 in film funding with mentoring from the British Film Institute and a voucher for £5,000 to spend on Nikon Equipment.

In 2014, the film was featured in the Très Court International Film Festival in which it was screened in over 100 cities in 23 countries.

The film went on to appear in many domestic and international festivals including the Bradford International Film Festival, the Shärt International Comedy Film Festival and the Aberfeldy Film Festival where it picked up the Palme-Dewar Audience Choice Award.

== Awards ==
Year	Awards	Category	Recipient(s)	Result
2013	Virgin Media Shorts Awards	TiVo Award	John McPhail	Won
2013	Virgin Media Shorts Awards	Nikon People's Choice Award	John McPhail	Won
2014	The Scottish Short Film Festival	Audience Choice Award	John McPhail, Andrew Lanni	Won
2014	Aberfeldy Film Festival	Palme-Dewar Audience Choice Award	John McPhail, Andrew Lanni	Won
2015	Loch Ness Film Festival	Best Micro Short	John McPhail, Andrew Lanni	Won
