= Jim Sweeney (actor) =

Scottish actor (born 1956)

- Born: 8 August 1956 (age 69); Scotland
- Occupation: Actor
- Years active: 2005–present
- Notable work: The Groundsman; Outlander; The Wee Man; The Angels' Share

Jim Sweeney (born 8 August 1956) is a Scottish actor. Over the years, Sweeney has starred in a variety of productions for both film and television. Starting with a small role in River City, he later went on to play Mick Turner in The Crews opposite actors such as David Hayman. In film he has appeared in The Angels Share and The Wee Man as well as a variety of short films. In 2013, he took part in a tribute video to Quentin Tarintino's Reservoir Dogs to mark the 21st birthday of the film. The film recreated the opening scene of the original picture with Sweeney playing the role of Joe Cabot. The film was shot in Glasgow and was directed by Colin Ross Smith. Recently, Sweeney has starred in the starred in the Outlander television series and the short film The Groundsman, which was nominated for the 'Best Fiction' accolade at the 2014 British Academy Scotland New Talent Awards.

== Filmography ==
Year(s)	Title	Role	Notes
2005	The Perfect Candidate	Mr Walker	Short Film
2005	Bottle	Neighbour	Short Film
2006	The Loft	Adrian	Short Film
2006	Darkness	Vladimir	Short Film
2006	You're Fired	Police Chief Sidings	Feature Film
2007	The Whipping Game	Lu Lu	TV series
2009	Idol of Evil	Gordon Tessio	Feature Film
2009	River City	Ernie Simpson	TV series (1 episode)
2009	Running in Traffic	Steadmans Worker	Feature Film
2009	Mission X	John McBride	Feature Film
2011	Gameboyz	Brian	Short Film
2011	The Crews	Mick Turner	TV series (6 episodes)
2011	Coffee	Jack	Short Film
2012	The Angels Share	Policeman	Feature Film
2012	The Bench	Edward Oakes	Feature Film
2013	The Wee Man	Gordon Ross	Feature Film
2013	Notes	Landlord	Short Film
2013	The Groundsman	board member No. 1	Short Film
2013	V for Visa	Stacey's Dad	Short Film
2013	Zombie Resurrection	Mac	Feature Film
2013	Crime Lord	Logan MacKenzie	Video Short
2014	How Do I Get Up There?	Various	TV movie
2015	Outlander	Andrew MacDonald	TV series (1 episode)
2015	Sunset Song	Preacher	Feature Film
2015	The Fairy Flag	Raghnall	Feature Film
2015	The Arrival of Harvey Di Maria	Victor	Short Film
2015	Plan Z	Bill's Dad (voice)	Feature Film
2015	Where Do We Go From Here?	Jim Lockhart	Feature Film
2015	The Wake Up	Simon	Short Film ( In Pre Production)
2016	Tommy's Honour	Mr. Murray	Feature Film
2017	Birds in the Sky	George Cain	Short Film
2017	Isolani	Brian Ross	Feature Film
2018	Inside Out	Derek	Feature Film
2019	Schemers	Father Vetriannio	Feature Film
2020	Autumn Never Dies	Terrorist leader	Short Film
2020	The Punishment	Michael's Boss	Short Film

== Awards ==
Year	Nominated Work	Awards	Category	Result
2022	Autumn Never Dies	Scotland International Festival of Cinema	Best Ensemble Cast in a Featurette (Shared with All Cast)	Nominated

== See also ==
- The Groundsman
