= V for Visa =

- Film poster
- Directed by: John McPhail
- Written by: John McPhail; Andrew Lanni
- Produced by: Andrew Lanni
- Starring: Tyler Collins; Natalie Wallace
- Cinematography: Calum Weir
- Edited by: Stuart Doherty
- Music by: Tyler Collins
- Production company: Worrying Drake Productions
- Release date: 26 August 2013
- Running time: 13 minutes
- Country: United Kingdom
- Language: English

V for Visa is a short dark romantic comedy film about an American who is facing deportation from Scotland. His only solution is to marry someone and quick. V for Visa is the second installment of a trilogy of short films by Worrying Drake Productions.

== Plot ==
Brad (Tyler Collins) is an American musician facing deportation from Scotland when his visa application is rejected. Without any other conceivable alternative, he has to marry someone to stay in the country and asks his band's stalker Stacey (Natalie Wallace) if she would go along with his plan. However, after the ceremony, it becomes clear that Stacey is not as she seems and already has plans for the newly wed couple.

== Main cast ==
- Tyler Collins as Brad
- Natalie Wallace as Stacey
- Emma Claire Brightlyn as the Visa Lady
- Jack Nelson as Scott
- Francis Carroll as Dav
- Pol McGowan as Derek
- Jim Sweeney as the Stacey's Dad
- Jackie McPhail as Stacey's Mum
- Lauren Lamarr as the Minister
- John Gaffney as Homeless Man 1
- Joe Cassidy as Homeless Man 2

== Release ==
V for Visa was released on 26 August 2013 and had its North American premiere at the Robert De Niro's Tribeca Film Centre as part of the Bootleg Film Festival in New York where McPhail picked up the Best Director accolade.

== Awards ==
Year	Awards	Category	Recipient(s)	Result
2013	Bootleg Film Festival New York	Best Director	John McPhail	Won
2014	Blue Whiskey Independent Film Festival	Best Editor	Stuart Doherty	Won
2014	We Like 'Em Short Film Festival	Best Actress	Natalie Wallace	Won
