= Tyler Collins (actor) =

American actor

- Born: Anchorage, Alaska, U.S.
- Education: Royal Conservatoire of Scotland
- Occupations: Actor, composer
- Years active: 2010–present
- Notable work: Where Do We Go from Here?; Just Say Hi; V for Visa

Tyler Collins is an American actor and composer from Anchorage, Alaska. He is possibly best known for his role as the Boy in Just Say Hi and as James in Where Do We Go from Here? in which he was nominated for the Best Actor accolade at the 2015 Sydney Indie Film Festival in Australia. He later went on to win the Best Score award at the same event for his composition work on the film.

== Early life and film career ==
Collins was born in Anchorage in Alaska. His father was a musician who was drafted into the army during the Vietnam War and was given the option of serving in South East Asia or Alaska. His mother was from Connecticut but moved to Anchorage with her family when she was twelve years old. Collins studied at Interlochen Arts Academy, having been awarded a scholarship. It was whilst studying acting at the school that he learned about the Royal Conservatoire of Scotland after a deputation from staff members of the institution. Whilst studying stage acting at the Conservatoire he met and formed a close working relationship with John McPhail and Andrew Lanni.

Upon leaving the conservatoire, Collins starred in a number of short films including Dear Mom, where he was reunited with McPhail who was the cinematographer on the film. He also made an appearance in the BBC television series River City as Luke. In 2013, Collins was invite to play the lead role of Adam in the short film Notes about a pair of roommates whose relationship develops through a series of post it notes. The film was warmly received by critics with Thomas Simpson of MovieScramble writing:

The casting is excellent as the two leads breathe life into their roles. The actors are also naturally likeable which helped me care whether they get together or not.

Collins performance was later rewarded with the Best Actor accolade at the 2013 edition of the We Like 'Em Short Film Festival in Oregon.

In the summer of 2013, Collins was invited to play the lead role of the Boy in Just Say Hi. The film, about a blossoming romance between a boy and a girl who meet every morning at a bus stop, was made for the 2013 edition of the Virgin Media Short Awards. Making it through to the finals, the film went on to win 2 out of the 3 awards at a prestigious awards ceremony in London attended by Collins and the production team. The film was featured in the Très Court International Film Festival in which it was screened in over 100 cities in 23 countries.

In 2015, Collins took on his biggest role to date as the leading character of James in the feature film Where Do We Go From Here?. Shot in just 16 days, the film centres around the newly instated Nurse Jen of the 'Easy Love Care Home' who questions why the 25-year-old James is living and working in the care home. Determined to take his elderly fiends on one last adventure, James finds the only medical cover they can get is with the one person who doesn't want to be around old people. The film appeared at the 2015 edition of the Sydney Indie Film Festival where it was nominated for 7 awards with Collins receiving nominations for Best Actor and for Best Score as the films composer. Collins later went on to win the Best Score accolade.

== Stage career ==
Collins has enjoyed a wide variety of success on the stage. In 2015, he played the role of Parker in The Real Hoosewives Fae Glesga which played at the Pavilion Theatre in Glasgow. In the same year, he worked as a musician in the play Last Dream (On Earth) which was produced in association with the National Theatre of Scotland. The play won Collins the Best Music and Sound award from the Critics Awards for Theatre in Scotland.

He has also been a regular favourite amongst Pantomimes in Scotland since making his first appearance in 2013 in a production of Pinocchio in Dunfermline. The following year he returned to Dunfermline's Carnegie Hall playing the role of Numpty in an adaptation of Snow White. Writing about the performance, the Dumfermline Press Newspaper wrote:

A true hit with the audience was the loveable lanky dope Numpty performed by American actor Tyler Collins. The 6ft-something Numpty by name numpty by nature sent the kids and adults into giggles with his faultless Fife accent and gags.

Collins appeared as Mischievous Marvin in Santa Claus Is Coming To Town at the Pavilion Theatre in December 2015.

== Filmography ==
=== Film and television ===
Year	Film	Credited as		Role	Notes
Year	Film	Actor	Composer	Role	Notes
2010	Dear Mom	Yes		Randy Wiggam	
2012	Pouncer	Yes		Rusty Beence	
2012	Speaker with a Hat On	Yes		The Speaker	(voice)
2013	Notes	Yes	Yes	Adam	
2013	Just Say Hi	Yes		Boy	
2013	River City	Yes		Luke	TV series
2013	V for Visa	Yes	Yes	Brad	Writer
2015	Where Do We Go from Here?	Yes	Yes	James	
2016	Outlander	Yes		Private Max Lucas	

=== Stage ===
- Sea, and Land, and Sky (2010)
- Pinocchio (2013)
- Snow White (2014)
- Last Dream (On Earth) (2015)
- The Real Hoosewives Fae Glesga (2015)
- Wee Fat Glesga Wedding (2015)
- Santa Claus Is Coming To Town (2015)
- Aladdin (2019)

== Awards ==
Year	Nominated Work	Awards	Category	Result
2013	Notes	We Like 'Em Short Film Festival	Best Actor	Won
2015	Where Do We Go From Here?	Sydney Indie Film Festival	Best Score	Won
2015	Where Do We Go From Here?	Sydney Indie Film Festival	Best Actor	Nominated
2015	Last Dream (On Earth)	Critics Awards for Theatre in Scotland	Best Music and Sound Award	Won
2016	The Two Meter EP	Akademie Music Awards	Best Alternative Rock / Live EP	Won
2016	Where Do We Go From Here?	Blue Whiskey Independent Film Festival	Best Original Score	Won
2016	Where Do We Go From Here?	Blue Whiskey Independent Film Festival	Best Actor	Won
