= Ryan McHenry =

Scottish film director (1987–2015)

- Born: 13 December 1987; Dumfries, Scotland
- Died: 2 May 2015 (aged 27); Dumfries, Scotland
- Education: Edinburgh College of Art
- Occupation: Film director
- Years active: 2008–2015
- Notable work: Zombie Musical; Toast; Ryan Gosling Won't Eat His Cereal; Anna and the Apocalypse

Ryan McHenry (13 December 1987 – 2 May 2015) was a Scottish film director best known for the film Zombie Musical in which he received a nomination for the Best Director accolade at the 2011 British Academy Scotland New Talent Awards.

Zombie Musical would be adapted by McHenry and Alan McDonald into the 2017 feature film Anna and the Apocalypse, which would ultimately be released after McHenry's death.

== Life and career ==
Ryan McHenry was born in Dumfries in Scotland. In 2011 he wrote and directed the film Zombie Musical. The film, which was a joint adventure between Haphazard Media and Black Camel Pictures tells the story of Anna who starts at a new school in a small Scottish town. She is forced to deal with a zombie outbreak set to catchy songs. The film was a critical success and earned McHenry a nomination at the 2011 British Academy Scotland New Talent Awards.

In 2013, McHenry created the video series Ryan Gosling Won't Eat His Cereal. The series which started on Vine centred on a gimmick where McHenry attempted to feed cereal to a shot of Ryan Gosling on screen. Just before the spoon reached his mouth the actor would turn away as if he was rejecting the food. The videos became an internet sensation and McHenry went from having 8 followers to over 200,000 on his channel. The series also attracted attention from Entertainment Online and the Huffington Post. Gosling acknowledged the video series in April 2015, tweeting "I actually love cereal."

In late 2013, McHenry started experiencing a painful lump in his leg and consulted a doctor who diagnosed it as osteosarcoma that had spread to his lungs. He announced the news on his Twitter page with an upbeat spin saying

"I got told yesterday that I have cancer. I would just like to let you all know I'm staying positive and I'm going to fight it. Fuck Cancer."

During his chemotherapy sessions, McHenry continued to tweet and often turned to his followers for support and inspiration. On one occasion he called upon his followers to photoshop a selfie he had taken on his hospital bed. He was overwhelmed by the creative response of his followers.

== Death ==
After initial signs that McHenry had beaten cancer, he returned to work in July 2014 after a long course of chemotherapy. The cancer returned, and he died on 2 May 2015. Two days before his death he had tweeted, in his typical deadpan humour:

“Yesterday was my 10,000th day alive on this Earth and not one of you got me a card or anything..."

Upon the news of his death, Vine tweeted their own tribute to McHenry saying:

“Your creativity brightened many lives. Thank you. You'll be missed"

On 5 May, Gosling created his own Vine channel to post a tribute to McHenry. The clip showed Gosling pouring a bowl of cereal, saluting the camera with his spoon then proceeding to eat the cereal.

== Filmography ==
Year	Film	Credited as					Notes
Year	Film	Director	Camera Team	Writer	Actor	Role	Notes
2008	The Dead Outside				Yes	Dead & Background Dying	Production Assistant
2009	Time, Care and Attention		Yes				Director of Photography
2010	Buskers		Yes				Director of Photography
2011	Zombie Musical	Yes		Yes			Directoral Debut
2012	Outpost: Black Sun		Yes				Camera Trainee
2013	Toast	Yes		Yes			
2013	Outpost: Rise of the Spetsnaz		Yes		Yes	Nazi	Second assistant camera: b-camera
2013	Timelock		Yes		Yes	Armed Policeman	Second assistant camera
2013	Sunshine on Leith		Yes				EPK Director
2017	Anna and the Apocalypse			Yes		Co-writer (with Alan McDonald), based on McHenry's 2010 short film Zombie Musical	Released posthumously

== Awards ==
Year	Nominated Work	Awards	Category	Result
2011	Zombie Musical	British Academy Scotland New Talent Awards	Best Director	Nominated
2014	N/A	Shorty Awards	UK Category	Won
