= John McPhail (director) =

Scottish film director and screenwriter

- Born: Glasgow, Scotland
- Education: Royal Conservatoire of Scotland
- Occupations: Film director, screenwriter
- Years active: 2008–present
- Notable work: Anna and the Apocalypse; Where Do We Go From Here?; Just Say Hi; Notes

John McPhail is a Scottish film director and screenwriter.

== Life and career ==
McPhail studied Cinematography at the Royal Conservatoire of Scotland. During his time there, he met and formed a close working relationship with Tyler Collins and Andrew Lanni. After graduating from the Conservatoire, he worked on the BBC television series Waterloo Road and was assistant camera operator on the film Up There by Zam Salim.

In 2013, he formed his own production company Worrying Drake Productions and produced a trilogy of short films with Collins and Lanni to produce a trilogy of short comedy films; Notes was a romantic comedy about a pair of roommates whose relationship develops through a series of post it notes. V for Visa and Doug & Steve's Big Holy Adventure completed the comedy trilogy. V for Visa had its North American premiere at Robert De Niro's TriBeCa Film Centre in New York as part of the Bootleg Film Festival. The film went on to win the Best Director accolade at the festival.

His short three-minute film Just Say Hi, about a blossoming romance between a boy and a girl who meet every morning at a bus stop, made it through to the top 13 out of a short list of 250 films in the Virgin Media Shorts competition. Judge Robbie Collin of the Daily Telegraph said that Just Say Hi was:

"One of the sweetest payoffs I’ve seen in any rom-com this year."

The film won two out of the three awards available at the festival, making McPhail the first director in the competition's history to win multiple awards. The film was later picked up by the Très Court International Film Festival, where it was screened in more than 100 cities in 23 countries. McPhail launched a crowdfunding campaign to help fund his first feature film Where Do We Go From Here?, raising £10,630 in two months. Production began in the summer of 2014 with McPhail directing the film in 16 days in various location across Scotland including Falkirk, Alloa, Coatbridge, Glasgow and Loch Lomond. Speaking of his experience filming the feature to Impulse Magazine, McPhail said:

"It was the single best experience of my life. I didn’t eat or sleep for two and a bit weeks but I wouldn’t have changed it for the world."

The film was shown at the Cluj Comedy Film Festival in Romania, which McPhail attended along with producer Lauren Lamarr. In late October 2015, the film was screened at the Sydney Indie Film Festival, where it was nominated for seven awards. Unable to attend the awards ceremony, McPhail was represented by a friend who happened to be travelling around Australia at the time. The film picked up three awards at the festival for Best Score, Best Supporting Actress and Best Film.

In 2016, McPhail met with Nicholas Crum and Naysun Alae-Carew of Blazing Griffin about the possibility of directing their feature length musical film, Anna and the Apocalypse. The film based on the short film Zombie Musical by the late writer Ryan McHenry, tells the story of Anna and her school mates in their bid to survive a sudden zombie apocalypse t descends on their town in the run up to Christmas. A horror fan with John Carpenter considered as one of his biggest film influences, McPhail accepted the offer and filming began later that year in Greenock in Scotland.

Anna and the Apocalypse had its world premiere at Fantastic Fest on September 22, 2017 with many of the films cast and crew in attendance. The film had its UK premiere as part of the 2018 Edinburgh International Film Festival and was listed as one of the top 5 must see films at the festival by the Scotsman Newspaper. Anna and the Apocalypse was amongst the nominees at the 2018 British Academy Scotland Awards. for Best Feature Film, and best actress for Ella Hunt.

== Filmography ==
=== Film ===
| Year | Film | Credited as | | | | Additional Roles | Notes |
| Year | Film | Director | ScreenWriter | Camera | Film Editor | Additional Roles | Notes |
|---|---|---|---|---|---|---|---|
| 2008 | Battlestar Galactica: By Your Command | | | Yes | | | |
| 2010 | Wiped | | | Yes | | | |
| 2010 | Dear Mom | | | Yes | | | |
| 2010 | I Love Luci | | | Yes | | | Daily Camera Trainee |
| 2012 | Up There | | | Yes | | Assistant Camera | |
| 2013 | Notes | Yes | Yes | | | Producer | |
| 2013 | V for Visa | Yes | Yes | | | | |
| 2013 | Just Say Hi | Yes | Yes | | Yes | Actor - Norbert | |
| 2014 | Take It Back and Start All Over | Yes | | | | | First Assistant Director |
| 2014 | Broken Record | | | | | Colourist | |
| 2015 | Where Do We Go From Here? | Yes | Yes | | Yes | Executive Producer; Actor - Dog Poo Man | |
| 2015 | Aviatrix | Yes | | | | | Assistant Director |
| 2017 | Anna and the Apocalypse | Yes | | | | | |
| 2023 | Dear David | Yes | | | | | |
| 2025 | Grow | Yes | | | | | |

=== Television ===
| Year | Title | Director | Role | Notes |
|---|---|---|---|---|
| 2012–2013 | Waterloo Road | Various | Assistant Camera | 6 Episodes |
| 2015 | Metalhedz | Himself | Director | 1 Episode |
| 2016 | The Crews | Colin Ross Smith | Cinematographer | 10 Episodes |

== Awards ==
| Year | Nominated Work | Awards | Category | Result |
|---|---|---|---|---|
| 2013 | Just Say Hi | Virgin Media Short Awards | The TiVo Award | Won |
| 2013 | Just Say Hi | Virgin Media Short Awards | The Nikon People's Choice Award | Won |
| 2013 | Notes | Bootleg Film Festival Edinburgh | Best Scottish Film | Won |
| 2013 | Notes | Roughcut | Audience Choice Award | Won |
| 2013 | Notes | Aberfeldy Film Festival | Palme-Dewar Audience Choice Award | Won |
| 2014 | Notes | Ayr International Film Festival | Best Director | Won |
| 2014 | Notes | Ayr International Film Festival | Audience Choice Award | Won |
| 2014 | V for Visa | Bootleg Film Festival NYC | Best Director | Won |
| 2014 | Just Say Hi | The Scottish Short Film Festival | Audience Choice Award | Won |
| 2014 | Just Say Hi | Aberfeldy Film Festival | Palme-Dewar Audience Choice Award | Won |
| 2015 | Where Do We Go From Here? | Sydney Indie Film Festival | Best Film (Shared with Andrew Lanni and Lauren Lamarr) | Won |
| 2015 | Where Do We Go From Here? | Sydney Indie Film Festival | Best Editing | Nominated |
| 2015 | Just Say Hi | Loch Ness Film Festival | Best Micro Short | Won |
| 2016 | Where Do We Go From Here? | Bay Street Film Festival | People's Choice Award | Won |
| 2016 | Where Do We Go From Here? | Blue Whiskey Independent Film Festival | Best Director | Won |
| 2016 | Where Do We Go From Here? | Blow-Up Chicago International Arthouse Film Fest | Best Comedy (Shared with Andrew Lanni and Lauren Lamarr) | Won |
| 2017 | Anna and the Apocalypse | Rondo Hatton Classic Horror Awards | Best Independent Film | Nominated |
| 2018 | Anna and the Apocalypse | Edinburgh International Film Festival | Audience Award | Nominated |
| 2018 | Anna and the Apocalypse | British Academy Scotland Awards | Best Feature Film (Shared with Naysun Alae-Carew, Nicholas Crum, and Alan McDonald) | Nominated |
