= Alan Tennie =

- Born: Bearsden, Dunbartonshire, Scotland
- Genre: Alternate acoustic
- Occupations: Singer-songwriter, musician
- Years active: 2012–present
- Website: alantennie.com

Alan Tennie is a Scottish singer, songwriter and musician from Bearsden, Glasgow, Scotland.

On 26 June 2013, Tennie released his first EP Never Mind The Rain on digital platforms including iTunes. Peter McGee of music website BluesBunny gave the EP a rating of 4 out of 5 adding 'I can only write so many words on Never Mind The Rain, which is a shame because there's plenty to like about it that I've had to omit.' In November of the same year, Tennie appeared on the BBC Alba television programme Buskers.

Tennie also provided the music and vocals for the song "One Good Reason", which was written for the Scottish film The Greyness of Autumn. Commenting on the film's score, Nicholas La Salla of Forest City Film Review wrote '"One Good Reason" by Alan Tennie was a nice, slow and somber tune to accompany the subject matter'.
