= Where Do We Go from Here? (2015 film) =

- Film poster
- Directed by: John McPhail
- Written by: John McPhail
- Produced by: John McPhail; Andrew Lanni; Lauren Lamarr
- Starring: Tyler Collins; Lucy-Jane Quinlan; Alison Peebles
- Cinematography: Grant McPhee
- Edited by: John McPhail
- Music by: Tyler Collins
- Production company: Worrying Drake Productions
- Release date: 29 October 2015
- Running time: 122 minutes
- Country: United Kingdom
- Language: English

Where Do We Go from Here? is a Scottish comedy film directed by John McPhail and starring Tyler Collins, Lucy-Jane Quinlan, and Alison Peebles. The film centres on James, a young man who takes on the role of a janitor of a care home when his Grandad is forced into social care. It is the first feature to be directed by McPhail.

== Plot ==
When Jen starts her new Job as a nurse at the 'Easy Love Care Home, she is surprised to find James, a 25-year-old man living and working in the building. James and his three, elderly best friends hatch a plan to go on one last adventure and the only medical cover they can get is the one person who doesn’t want to be around old people. Will their plan go off without a hitch or is there a sell by date on adventure?

== Main cast ==
- Tyler Collins as James
- Lucy-Jane Quinlan as Jen
- Alison Peebles as Joan
- Richard Addison as Malcolm
- Maryam Hamidi as Miss Thompson
- Deirdre Murray as Nancy
- Jim Sweeney as Jim

== Release and reception ==
The film was released on 29 October 2015 and was screened at the Sydney Indie Film Festival where it was nominated for 7 awards. Unable to attend the awards ceremony, McPhail was represented by his sister in law who happened to be travelling around Australia at the time. The film went on win three awards at the festival including Best Score, Best Supporting Actress and Best Film. Speaking to the National Newspaper about the awards success, Director John McPhail said:

"I couldn’t believe we had won for our first feature film – we were jumping about in my kitchen going crazy when we heard. I would have liked to have been there but we had so much fun in the kitchen I’m kind of glad the way it worked out."

The film had its UK premiere at the 2016 edition of the Glasgow Film Festival. Speaking to the Sunday Herald about the films inclusion in the festival, McPhail said

"When people asked where we wanted the UK premiere to take place, I knew it had to be the Glasgow Film Festival - and if I was lucky it would screen in the Glasgow Film Theatre. That dream is going to become a reality and I honestly cannot wait."

Due to overwhelming demand for the film, the festival announced on Twitter that extra tickets would be released for the premiere screening at the Glasgow Film Theatre.

In 2016, actress Alison Peebles was nominated for the Best Supporting Actress at the 2016 BAFTA Scotland Film Awards.

== Awards ==
Year	Awards	Category	Recipient(s)	Result
2015	Sydney Indie Film Festival	Best Film	John McPhail, Andrew Lanni, Lauren Lamarr	Won
2015	Sydney Indie Film Festival	Best Female Supporting Actress	Deirdre Murray	Won
2015	Sydney Indie Film Festival	Best Score	Tyler Collins	Won
2015	Sydney Indie Film Festival	Best Female Lead Actress	Lucy-Jane Quinlan	Nominated
2015	Sydney Indie Film Festival	Best Female Supporting Actress	Alison Peebles	Nominated
2015	Sydney Indie Film Festival	Best Male Lead Actor	Tyler Collins	Nominated
2015	Sydney Indie Film Festival	Best Editing	John McPhail	Nominated
2016	Bay Street Film Festival	People's Choice Award	John McPhail	Won
2016	Blue Whiskey Independent Film Festival	Best Original Score	Tyler Collins	Won
2016	Blue Whiskey Independent Film Festival	Best Actor	Tyler Collins	Won
2016	Blue Whiskey Independent Film Festival	Best Supporting Actor	Richard Addison	Won
2016	Blue Whiskey Independent Film Festival	Best Director	John McPhail	Won
2016	British Academy Scotland Awards	Best Actress	Alison Peebles	Nominated
