= Death of a Vlogger =

- Directed by: Graham Hughes
- Written by: Graham Hughes
- Produced by: Graham Hughes
- Starring: Graham Hughes; Annabel Logan; Paddy Kondracki
- Cinematography: Kevin Walls
- Edited by: Graham Hughes
- Music by: Cullah
- Distributed by: 101 Films
- Release date: 24 August 2019 (Frightfest)
- Running time: 89 minutes
- Language: English

Death of a Vlogger is a 2019 Scottish horror/mystery found footage film, written and directed by Graham Hughes. The film premiered at the 2019 London FrightFest Film Festival.

The story is told both in found footage style and through interviews. It can be considered a mockumentary.

== Plot ==
Told in the style of a documentary, the story focuses on Graham, a once popular vlogger whose viewership has been steadily declining. He manages to gain a surge in popularity after capturing evidence of the supernatural during one of his livestreams and joins together with an online ghost hunter named Steve to capitalize on his revived viewership. This gains the attention of a professional journalist and debunker, Alice, who is able to not only show that the initial haunting was fake but also provide video of Graham and Steve admitting that this and all of the subsequent videos were false.

Graham experiences a harsh fallout from the expose, however Steve and Graham's partner Erin manage to escape with very little social scorn. An insincere sounding apology video only makes matters worse, particularly when a ghostly apparition appears in the background. Graham continues to release more videos that show him becoming increasingly more unhinged and attacking Steve, as he assumed that the man was responsible for the new hauntings. This all culminates in Graham admitting to Erin that he needs help as the hauntings grow in intensity, but that he wants to spend one more night in his flat to capture evidence to clear his name. During that last night Graham is attacked by a ghostly figure and appears to be caught in a spatial loop, as the ghost will not allow him to leave the building. He is only able to escape when the ghost pushes him down the stairs, causing him to pass out.

In an interview with Erin, the documentarian learns that Graham survived the fall and went into therapy. She also claims that he is done with social media, much to the scorn of Alice, who predicts that Graham will return to social media as soon as he is released from the hospital. Alice also points out evidence that this second haunting is also fake and that the entire scenario was set up from the start by Graham, Erin, and Steve, who all share a business email and have collaborated before. The film ends with Graham returning to the internet as Alice predicted, however he insists that the haunting was real. During his livestream he insists it was all real and hangs himself just before a piece of paper levitates. It is left up to the viewer to determine how much of this was real and whether or not the final supernatural act - and Graham's death - actually occurred.

== Cast ==
- Graham Hughes as Graham
- Annabel Logan as Erin
- Paddy Kondracki as Steve
- Joma West as Alice
- Stephen Beavis as Ian
- Patrick O'Brien as Dr. Watson
- Joise Rogers as Gabrielle

== Reception ==
The film has been met with mostly positive reviews from the horror community.

Rafael of slashfilm.com rated this film a 9/10, stating: "A twisted story of warped perceptions, megalomania, the victims in the middle of media manipulation and our own obsession with online cruelty that results in a breath of fresh air in an overcrowded genre." Matt Glasby of Total Film gave the film 4 out of 5 stars stating "Hughes pulls off a real coup with this frightening faux-documentary."

However, Damien Riley from Horrornews.net was more critical of the film, stating: " Unfortunately, if you are looking for Death of a Vlogger to be the next great horror mockumentary, I'm afraid you will be let down."

The film was long-listed for a BIFA Discovery Award.
