= Hannah Ord =

- Born: Strathaven, South Lanarkshire, Scotland
- Occupation: Actor
- Notable work: Last Night in Edinburgh

Hannah Ord is a BAFTA winning Actor for her role in Last Night in Edinburgh.

== Film and television ==
Year	Film	Role
2015	Last Night in Edinburgh	As Hoda
2014	FIELD TRIP OF NIGHTMARES	As shye
2013	THE SILLY SKETCH SHOW	As Various
2012	THE DETECTIVES	As Concert Girl
