= The Gaelic King =

- Directed by: Philip Todd
- Written by: Matthew Todd; Philip Todd
- Produced by: Caroline Couret-Delegue; Nathan Todd; Jezz Vernon
- Starring: Jake McGarry; Shona Melrose; Kerry Browne; Noah Irvine; Laurence Whitley; Peter Cosgrove; Simon DeSilva
- Cinematography: David J. Usieto
- Edited by: Philip Todd
- Music by: Charlie Wilkins
- Production company: Fellowship Film
- Distributed by: 4Digital Media
- Release date: 10 July 2017
- Running time: 90 minutes
- Country: United Kingdom
- Language: English

The Gaelic King is a 2017 British historical fantasy film, set in the Scottish dark ages. It stars Jake McGarry in the lead role, with Philip Todd directing.

== Plot ==
From Amazon UK:

"Set in the war-torn dark ages of 800AD Scotland, this is the story of a young Warrior-King named Alpin. When his family is murdered by a rival Pict King, Alpin and his infant brother Finn, are the sole escapees. Alpin swears to one day return, seeking vengeance and regain his rightful claim to the throne.

Ten years later Alpin and Finn, return and come across a community whose children are being kidnapped by the mysterious dark 'Shadow Warriors'. When Finn gets captured, Alpin sets out to rescue him, accompanied by a Druid-monk called Lachlan. What ensues is a gripping adventure, culminating in a final epic battle between Alpin and Nathara, the sorceress who awoke and controls the Shadow Warriors."

== Cast ==
- Jake McGarry as Alpin
- Noah Irvine as Finn
  - Daniel Todd as Baby Finn
- Shona Melrose as Edana, the Pictish princess who helps Alpin
- Kerry Browne as The Sorceress, Nathara
- Laurence Whitley as Lachlan, an eccentric druid-priest
- Peter Cosgrove as Fergus, the leader of the Pictish tribe
- Ellie Reid as Sinead, daughter of Lachlan and Biddy
- Alan Cuthbert as Torcall, leader of the villagers
- Eve Wengel as Kyra
- Simon DeSilva as King Unust, Edana's father
- Alasdair Blair as King Eachdach, Alpin's father
- David Richardson as King Conall
- Olivia Easton as Kidnapped Child
- Kyle Wallace as Gart, one of the Pictish war-band
- Fiona Stewart as Biddy, Lachlan's wife
- Rhona Fleming as Alpin's Mother
- Chris Watt as Vind, a Pict warrior
- Tony Fuggle as Dunadd Gael
- Scott Iain Robertson as Nechtan
- Alistair Wales as Ciar

== Production ==
=== Funding ===
The second block of filming was largely crowdfunded by a successful Indiegogo campaign, which raised over £8,000.

=== Filming ===
Filming took place in Scotland over 3 blocks between 2015 and 2016. Main locations were Stirling and the Cairngorms. As part of the production, a full scale dark age village was constructed, with help from the local communities.

== Release ==
The Gaelic King was released in the UK on 10 July 2017.

=== Home media ===
The Gaelic King was released on DVD in the UK on 10 July 2017 online and in high street retailers such as HMV.

== Soundtrack ==
- Hope is Coming - Performed by Kerrie Finlay and Stephen Chalk
