= Andy O'Donnell (footballer) =

Australian rules footballer

Personal information
- Full name: Andrew Joseph O'Donnell
- Born: 5 July 1885; Carlton, Victoria
- Died: 10 December 1965 (aged 80); Fitzroy, Victoria
- Original team: Carlton Juniors

Playing career^{1}
Years	Club	Games (Goals)
1910, 1912–1913	Carlton	13 (0)
- ^{1} Playing statistics correct to the end of 1913.

Andrew Joseph O'Donnell (5 July 1885 – 10 December 1965) was an Australian rules footballer who played for the Carlton Football Club in the Victorian Football League (VFL).
