= Andrew O'Donnell =

Scottish actor

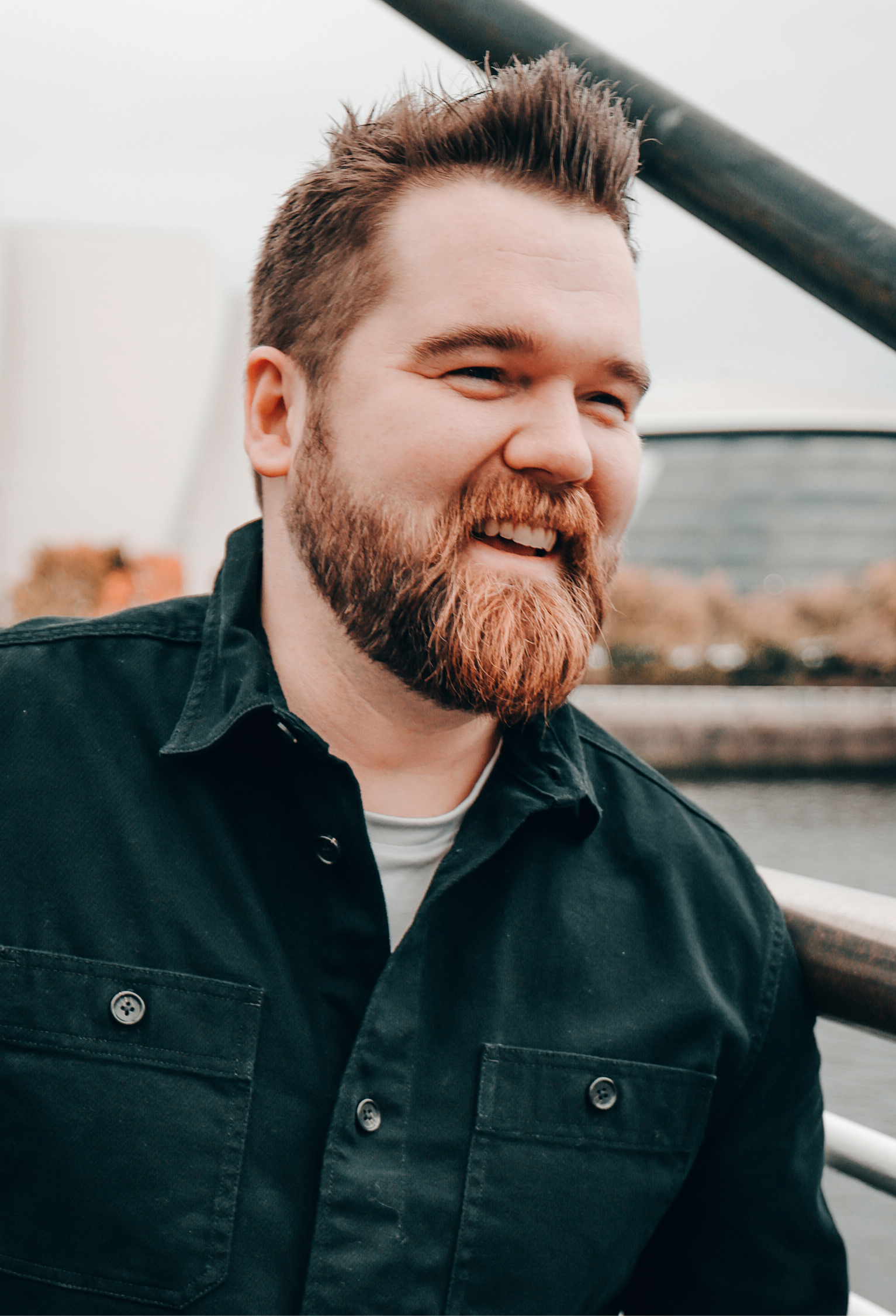

Director of the Glasgow Filmmakers Alliance
- In office 31 October 2011 – 30 June 2019
- Deputy: Chris Quick
- Preceded by: Position established
- Succeeded by: Chris Quick

Personal details
- Spouse: Jeni Hay (m. 2024)
- Occupation: Actor

Andrew O'Donnell is a former Scottish actor and the co-founder of the Glasgow Filmmakers Alliance. He served as the director of the organisation from its conception before stepping down from the role on 30 June 2019. He currently is the owner of Rocket Monkey Roastery Ltd in Ayr, Scotland. As an actor, he is possibly best known for the role of Jimmy Guinness in the film The Greyness of Autumn.

== Biography ==
From a young age, O'Donnell was keen on acting. At school he performed in a wide variety of productions and achieved Grade 8 in Musical Theatre from The London College of Music. After achieving an HND award in Acting and Performance at Langside College he went on to graduate from the University of the West of Scotland with a degree in Contemporary Screen Acting.

In 2011, he made a cameo appearance in the film Perfect Sense as a night clubber. He also provided the voice for the characters of Harbour Master and the Cameraman in the Scottish feature film In Search of La Che. The following year, he landed the role of Jimmy Guinness in the film The Greyness of Autumn. O'Donnell's performance was widely praised by critics with John McArthur of Moviescramble saying "His scene was laugh out loud funny and still raises a smile when thinking about it." Mark Bell of Film Threat wrote "Whether it's Jimmy the construction worker who has a mishap on the job or the awfully-wigged bartender, everyone buys into the general tone of dry and matter-of-fact delivery, even when conversing with a puppet or getting into a fight with one. It gives the entire experience a wonderful flavour."

O'Donnell has also performed in theatre including a version of The Dumb Waiter by Harold Pinter which was produced by the Hipshot Theatre company in Ayr. In preparation for the role, O'Donnell and his co-star Chris Taylor locked themselves in solitary confinement to appreciate the situations the characters are facing in the play.

== Glasgow Filmmakers Alliance ==
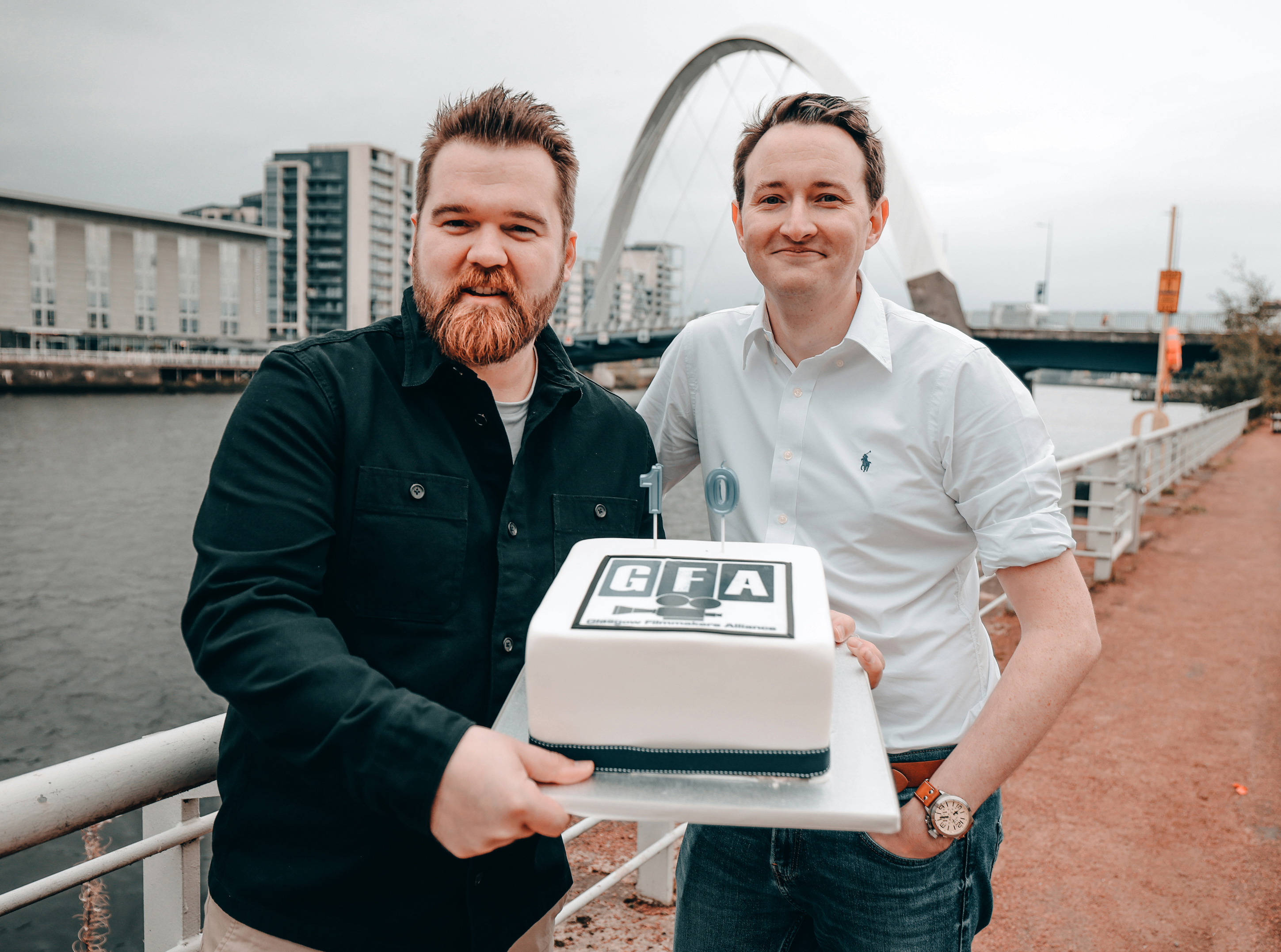
O'Donnell reunited with Chris Quick in October 2021 to celebrate the 10th anniversary of the Glasgow Filmmakers Alliance.

O'Donnell co-founded the Glasgow Filmmakers Alliance with Chris Quick in October 2011. The non-profit organisation hosts an online database with the details of film industry professionals and companies operating in and around the city of Glasgow.

In 2012, the alliance was invited by Stephen Paton of Production Attic to form what would become the Glasgow Creative Network which hosts networking events for media professionals in Glasgow.

In 2014, O'Donnell and Quick wrote an open letter on behalf of the independent filmmakers of Glasgow to the director of BAFTA Scotland, Jude MacLaverty. In the letter, the pair asked the film body to consider a proposal of including three new awards at the annual ceremony aimed at low budget / independent filmmakers. On 28 October, it was announced that the proposal would be placed on the agenda of the next Bafta Scotland Committee meeting in December 2014.

In April 2019, O'Donnell announced his departure from the organisation to focus on his new business.

== Rocket Monkey Roastery Ltd ==
After retiring from acting, O'Donnell became the owner of Rocket Monkey Roastery Ltd in Scotland. The company is widely known for delivering wholesale coffee in re-sealable, reusable tins.

== Filmography ==
=== Film ===
Year	Title	Director	Role	Notes
2011	Perfect Sense	David Mackenzie	Night Clubber	
2011	In Search of La Che	Mark D. Ferguson	Cameraman / Harbour Master	(Voice)
2012	The Greyness of Autumn	Chris Quick	Jimmy Guinness	
2013	The Making of 'Tam O' Shanter – The Mornin Eftir'	Chris Quick	Himself	Short; Documentary

=== Stage ===
Year	Title	Director	Role	Company
2011	Cell A Secret	Chris Taylor	Justin	Hipshot Theatre
2012	The Dumb Waiter	Chris Taylor; Andrew O'Donnell	Gus	Hipshot Theatre

Media offices
Preceded by Office established	Director; Glasgow Filmmakers Alliance; 2011–2019	Succeeded by Chris Quick
