= 2011 British Academy Scotland New Talent Awards =

2011 Talent Award Show

- Date: 24 March 2011
- Site: Glasgow Film Theatre; Scotland
- Hosted by: Kaye Adams

Television coverage
- Network: Streaming webcast

The 2011 British Academy Scotland New Talent Awards were held on 24 March 2011 at the Glasgow Film Theatre. Presented by BAFTA Scotland, the accolades honour the best upcoming talent in the field of film and television in Scotland. The Nominees were announced on 15 March 2011. The ceremony was hosted by Kaye Adams.

== Winners and nominees ==
Winners are listed first and highlighted in boldface.

Best Director	Best Acting Performance
**Lou McLoughlan - Caring For Calum**: Ryan McHenry - Zombie Musical; David Stoddart - Solstice	**Hannah Stanbridge – Outcast (2010 film) as Petronella**: Eileen MacLennane – An Seoladh; Amiera Darwish – Strange Places as Cat
Best Writer	Best Technical Achievement
**Graeme McGeagh, Graham Hughes, Keith Grantham – The Big Slick**: Graham Fitzpatrick – Mum's Birthday; Scott MacKay, David Barras – Electric Man	**Julian Schwanitz** – **Disco** **(Director Of Photography)**: Grace Change - Dogged (Costume Design); Matt Cameron - Meta (Visual Effects)
Best Producer (Short Form)	Best Producer (Fiction/Factual)
**Naysun Alae-Carew – Zombie Musical**: John Fairfield - Meta; Victoria Thomas - The Bride's Ball	**Sarah Drummond – Mum's Birthday**: Lizzie Gray – River City; Richard Nicholls – End of the Road
Best Experimental/Art	Best Original Music
**Lyrical Spread – Ian Robertson**: Home – Krish Shrikumar; Another Day – Will Anderson	**Pete MacDonald – Fixing Luka**: Alexander Horowitz – Room 9; Toby Mottershead – Zombie Musical

=== Special Award for Student Work ===
- Lou McLoughlan - Caring For Calum

== See also ==
- 2011 British Academy Scotland Awards
