= Deep Fried Film Festival =

The Deep Fried Film Festival is an independent Film Festival that takes place every July in Lanarkshire, Scotland.

== Origins ==
Festival director, Martin Greechan, conceived the Deep Fried Film Festival in 2005. Martin was teaching a full-time media course for fps media charity in Motherwell when he had the idea of screening the students’ work under the banner of The Deep Fried Film Festival. The night was a success and Martin took his bosses the idea of a full-blown international festival that would showcase films from around the world and help to stimulate the film industry in Lanarkshire and its surrounding areas. FPS media passed on the idea saying it would be too time-consuming, non-financially viable and not generate any interest. Disillusioned by this feedback Martin set out to prove them wrong and set up the site Deepfriedfilm.org.uk. Within two weeks of being up the festival had received its first submission "Botch" from Dublin, many followed and this was before the festival had been announced to Martin's employers. The festival is now in its fourth year, receives international press, has grown year on year.

The Deep Fried Film Festival hopes that it inspires not only filmmakers but also anyone who has been told they can't follow a dream to go out and prove people wrong. Martin Greechan has since left fps media and is currently working full-time for Deep Fried Film promoting independent cinema.

== History ==
The festival shows a range of films from around the world and screens not only feature length films and documentaries, but also shorts, animations and music videos. Established in 2006, it was designed to be an egalitarian forum for anyone with the drive to produce a film and give them the opportunity to show their work on the big screen. Submission fees are kept low to encourage grassroot filmmakers as well as professionals, in direct contrast to the Edinburgh International Film Festival (EIFF), which the festival director felt was discouraging filmmakers with their submission charges.

== Mission statement ==
The Deep Fried Film Festival aims to develop the talent and skills of filmmakers, by encouraging better practises amongst filmmakers and increasing relationships between filmmakers and production organisations. By involving the local community, raising awareness of independent film and creating film making opportunities the Deep Fried Film Festival intends to help filmmakers get access to necessary practical and theoretical resources, filmmakers realise their abilities and promote themselves to a larger audience.

Deep Fried Film seeks to provide an annual film festival as well as the set up of informal network/support groups to fulfil its aims. Any profits generated by the Deep Fried Film Festival shall be put back into the promotion and development of independent filmmakers.

== 2007 Awards ==
2007 Golden Fritter Awards

- Pomme de terre: Codehunters
- Fish Supper: Tommy The Kid
- Sausage Supper: Carl's Angels
- Haggis Supper: What Happens to the Innocent?
- Black Pudding Supper: The Long Man
- Chip Buttie: A Shot in the West
- Chips & Curry Sauce: Fen
- Chips & Cheese: My Lucky Day

== 2010 ==
In 2010 the festival celebrated its fifth year and showed 121 films over a two-week period. The festival was run on a budget if £2,000 and raised money for NSPCC, Marie Curie, Mary's Meals, The Conforti Institute and St. Andrew's Hospice.

== Celebrity endorsements ==
Mark Millar

"Growing up in North Lanarkshire, film festivals always seemed like something we only ever saw on TV as a location report from Barry Norman. The idea of one on our doorstep like the Deep Fried Film Festival is incredibly exciting, not just for aspiring film-makers, but for anyone with an appreciation of movies in general. So many of us grew up thousands of miles from where the action seemed to be happening, but now it's taking place five minutes away."

Billy Boyd (actor)

"That's sounds great. I'll definitely check it out."

== Sponsors ==
The festival is sponsored by several local business, including Copycare Services, a local print and design company, North Lanarkshire Council, Papercrane Media, L107, a local radio station and Reeltime Music, a community music charity.
