= 2012 British Academy Scotland New Talent Awards =

- Date: 22 March 2012
- Site: Oran Mor; Glasgow; Scotland
- Hosted by: Muriel Gray

Television coverage
- Network: Streaming webcast

The 2012 British Academy Scotland New Talent Awards were held on 22 March 2012 at the Oran Mor in Glasgow. Presented by BAFTA Scotland, the accolades honour the best upcoming talent in the field of film and television in Scotland. The Nominees were announced on 12 March 2012. The ceremony was hosted by Muriel Gray.

== Winners and nominees ==
Winners are listed first and highlighted in boldface.

Best Fiction Film (Under 30 Minutes)	Best Acting Performance
**Rabbit Punch**: Secret of Confession; The Taxidermist	**Lynn Murray – Falling for Fitzgerald as Melanie**: Alex Millan – Green as Paul; Lauren Grace Wilson – Bird as Girl
Best Factual Film (Under 30 Minutes)	Best Factual Film (Over 30 Minutes)
**Kirkcaldy Man – Julian Schwanitz**: Joose – Gary Welford, Robbie Ross; The Theft of the Mona Lisa – Dhivya Kate Chetty	**How to Start a Revolution – Ruaridh Arrow**: Josie My Cancer Cure – Amber Comerford; Karama Has No Walls – Sarah Isaac
Best Writer	Best Original Music
**Agata Jagodzinska – Secret of Confession**: Kenny Parker – Scissors; Rick Hughes – Victim	**An Interrupted Story – Gareth Griffiths**: Electric Man – Blair Mowat; My First Spellbook – Claire McKenzie
Best Director of Photography	Best Editor
**Hakon Palsson – No More Shall We Part**: Martin Smith - Jimmy; Marek Borkowski - Rabbit Punch	**Johanna Erkholtz – The Taxidermist**: Chris Fallen – Green; Karel Dolak – My Name was Jane
Best Game	Best Animation
**Sculpty – Team Tickle**: Sphlem – Sphleh; The Quest – Guerilla Tea	**It's ABout Spending Time Together – Ainslie Henderson**: How Can You Swallow So Much Sleep? – Anna Ginsburg; Let Me Come In – Paul Rice

=== Special Award for New Work ===
- How Can You Swallow So Much Sleep?

== See also ==
- 2012 British Academy Scotland Awards
