= Molins Horror Film Festival =

Annual horror film festival in Molins de Rei, Catalonia, Spain

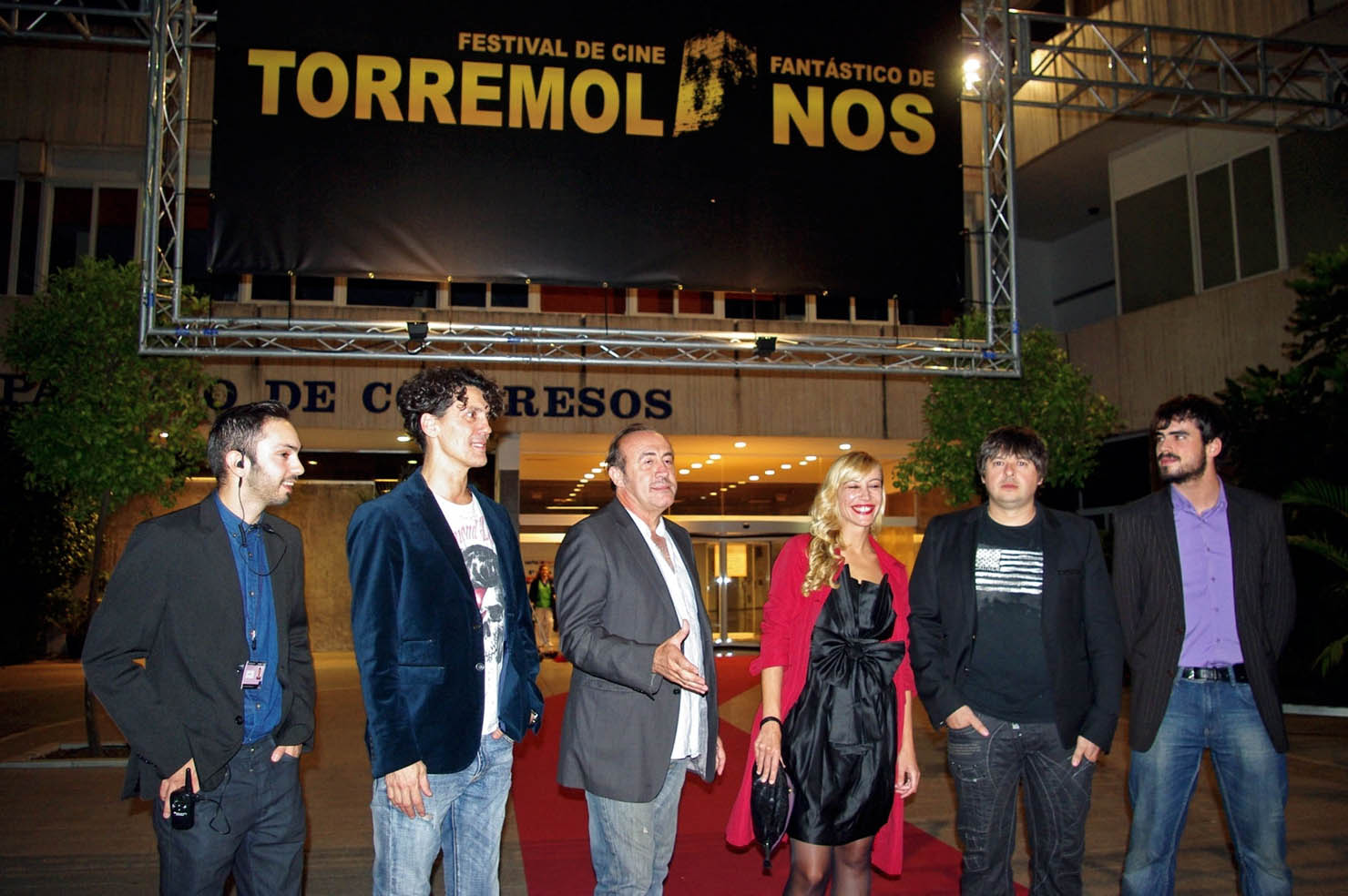
- Molins Horror Film Festival 2013
- Location: Molins de Rei, Catalonia, Spain
- Founded: 1973; 53 years ago
- Website: molinsfilmfestival.com

The Molins Horror Film Festival, or simply TerrorMolins, is an annual horror-focused film festival which takes place in Molins de Rei, Catalonia, Spain. It started in 1973 as a single event called Sixteen Hours of Horror Films (Catalan: Setze Hores de Cine de Terror), which was the first film marathon fully devoted to horror cinema in the Iberian Peninsula.

== History ==
=== Horror film marathon (1973–1977) ===
The Festival's origin is in 1973, with the celebration of the first horror film marathon in Catalonia, organised by the local cinephile association. In the 1970s there was a comeback of the horror genre, with films that would soon become classics like for instance William Friedkin's The Exorcist. In the beginning, it was a sixteen hour long marathon of horror films. It used to be held in the first days of July, between Saturday 21:00 pm and Sunday 13:00 pm with only two breaks. In 1974, after the success of the first edition, the Setze hores de cinema de terror was held again in collaboration with the Molins de Rei Cinephile Club and the Cine Joventut, today known as La Peni theatre. That year, the event offered films like Alfred Hitchcock's Psicosis and Horror Express by Eugenio Martin, among others.

=== Dotze hores de terror (1978–1993) ===
On the 1978 edition, the initial sixteen hours became twelve and the title changed to Dotze hores de Cine de Terror de Molins de Rei with ten films on screen, including newer films than before. The success from the last years, a thorough campaign of the Festival and the fact that there were no other events of the like besides the Sitges Film Festival, resulted in a crowded theatre with more than three hundred people who had to stay out with a sold out post on the ticket stall. A few years later, the marathon format started to offer seven films including a surprise one.

In 1979, the event had the same format but some creepy happenings were performed in between films. When the first film ended, two musicians were on stage (they played a synthesiser and an organ) along with spooky characters and settings. The screening of The Texas Chain Saw Massacre by Tobe Hooper was the leitmotif of some of the performances. The end of the film brought two hooded men holding chainsaws in the middle of the theatre room among a terrified audience. The police took one of the actors and part of the organisation to the police station to declare that the chainsaws were unarmed (something that both police and audience did not know beforehand). The performance was aimed at going beyond the screen and bring horror into the room. William Friedkin's The Exorcist would close the sixth edition of the Dotze hores de terror. At the same time, there was a screening of a selection of canonic genre films.

The 1981 edition hosted more than four hundred aficionados who witnessed the horror setting along with a very special programme for thirteen hours and a half in two parallel film theatres: Joventut Catòlica (La Peni) and the Cinema Versalles Palace. That year, the marathon started out with Nosferatu by Werner Herzog and closed with Alien by Ridley Scott, including performances at the end of each screening plus a lecture at 3:00 am. Further films where The Hills Have Eyes by Wes Craven, Invasion of the Body Snatchers by Philip Kaufman and The Fury by Brian De Palma, among others. The expected fund raising wanted to cover the deficit suffered by the cine-club. In 1981 campaign included billboard posters, press and radio adverts. On this occasion, the Joventut cinema included Hera group's performance and a trip to Count Dracula's homeland Transilvania was offered to be won on a raffle. There were also films like The Fog by John Carpenter, Dracula by John Badham and Freaks by Tod Browning, among others.

In 1982, the Dotze hores de cinema de terror de Molins de Rei repeated the model of two parallel screenings, on this occasion the venues were Cinema Joventut and Foment. More than one thousand people attended the screenings of Halloween by John Carpenter, The Funhouse by Tobe Hopper, Scanners by David Cronenberg, Friday the 13th by Sean S. Cunningham and The Shining by Stanley Kubrick. The Dotze horobe Hooper's Poltergeist and John Landis's An American Werewolf in London.

The 1983 edition opened with a mourning ceremony in honour of Lon Chaney's cinematographic remains. Chaney was the first werewolf on screen ever. This time controversy was present again for several reasons: the use of an obituary to promote the event, the use of the town funeral service including a coffin, funeral wreath as well as an actor playing a priest, mourning parade and local police vehicles closing the event around the town streets.

In 1984, Antoni D'Ocón and DerkoFilms registered the rights of the Dotze Hores de Cinema de Terror. This was the only time that Antoni D'Ocón organized the event and conducted the economic proceedings. From ten o'clock pm till ten in the morning, the screening consisted of films like The Evil Dead by Sam Raimi, The Changeling by Peter Medak and Creepshow by George A. Romero. The Cine Club Molins went on with the organisation of the Dotze hores de cinema de terror until 1990. The 1986 programme consisted of recently premiered successful films like Re-Animator by Stuart Gordon and Wes Craven's Nightmare on Elm Street, among others.

=== Hard Times and Reset: 1990–2000 ===
There is no evidence that the event might be held between 1991 and 1992. In January 1993, a group of young cinema lovers from Molins decided to reset the Cine Club de Molins de Rei in order to organise monthly film sessions and restart the Dotze hores de cinema de terror. The 1993 edition programme included films such as Bram Stoker's Dracula directed by Francis Ford Coppola, Acción mutante by Alex de la Iglesia, Reservoir Dogs by Quentin Tarantino and Tim Burton's Edward Scissorhands. The economic difficulties forced it to be the unique edition of this reborn. In 1994, the Cine Club Molins de Rei restarts its activity with an exhibition along with cine club sessions (including introductions, screenings and discussions). Although the committee intended to recover the Dotze hores de cinema de Terror, they did not succeed in the period 1994–2000. Moreover, in 1995 the Cinema Versalles Palace, one of the venues of the marathon, terminated its activity.

In 2001, again a group of film lovers decided to reset the marathon Dotze hores de Cine de Terror de Molins de Rei as well as the Cine-club itself. The format of the event started to change with the introduction of screenings aside from the marathon. A week before the marathon, the recently premiered film Faust 5.0 by vanguard group La Fura dels Baus was programmed and there was a short film programme too, including Jaume Balagueró’s short films Alícia i Días sin luz, as well as to short films on the character Evilio by Santiago Segura.

The marathon was still there with a seven films programme and live performances, on this occasion the eventual car crash brought an ambulance and live mice were thrown around the audience. The most relevant films of the event were The Ring-Two by Hideo Nakata, Peter Jackson's Bad Taste, Michael Haneke's Funny games as a surprise film, and The Nameless by Jaume Balagueró which was introduced by one member of the cast, Karra Elejalde.

== Molins Horror Film Festival ==
In 2003 the Dotze hores de Cine de Terror de Molins de Rei became Festival de Cine de Terror de Molins de Rei / Molins Horror Film Festival. The latest editions had already started to spread out of the marathon and performances. It was in 2003 that the short film contest was definitely established. On this occasion, actor Luis Posada introduced the best works and an exhibition celebrated the last thirty years presenting billboard posters and hand leaflets from all the editions. In 2004, the schedule included the first Concurs d’art efímer and the first Horror Short Stories contest. Moreover, the Festival paid tribute to movie maker Jesús Franco, who would also be the president of the Horror Short Film Contest. He was awarded in acknowledgement for his long and forgotten professional career. In 2005, there was no doubt of the national and international of the Horror Short Film Contest, when 110 works were submitted to assess their inclusion to competition. The short story contest took a hiatus until 2008 Moreover, some jury members were eventually not able to be present.

In 2006, the newspaper La Vanguardia published a ranking of film festivals, and according to José Pablo Jofre, the Molins Horror Film Festival was No. 3 just behind Zoom Igualada and Festival internacional de cinema negre de Manresa. Thereafter Molins Horror Film Festival introduced new elements year after year, especially with the extension of the short film contest from one to two days. Moreover, the Festival started its collaboration on several activities with the local library. The film The Raven by Roger Corman was on the big screen and there was a horror short story session narrated by Ferran Martín on Halloween night at the Sala Gòtica. The leitmotif of the Festival was the evolution of the genre over the last thirty years. The following year, 2007, the leitmotif was the technique in makeup special FX. The Festival had Montse Ribé, a makeup artist who had worked on films like Fragile by Jaume Balagueró and Guillermo del Toro's Pan's Labyrinth. In collaboration with the public library "Pere Vila", today renamed "Biblioteca el Molí", the short story contest was back on schedule. La Peni, film theatre venue of the marathon became a field hospital, to stop a presumed virus which might have been spreading around the town. The 2008 format did not have any modifications except that it included the exhibition DDT-Ficcions Originals with artwork by Oscar awarded Montse Ribé and David Martí Surroca at the exhibition room of Ca n’Ametller which was visited by ten thousand people.

EIn 2009, it included a contest of festival posters which brought an artistic improvement on the advertisement banners and billboard posters. On this edition, the leitmotif for both posters and Festival was the presence of children in horror films. There also was a concert by the punk metal band First Jason, which included musician and actor Ari Lehman, the first Jason Voorhees of the saga of Sean S. Cunningham's Friday the 13th. Ari Lehman was also a member of the jury of the eighth contest of horror short films. Film maker Jaume Balagueró was also present on the event.

Since 2010, the Festival has been growing both in time and content, so at present it takes ten days with more than one hundred feature films and short films. The Festival also includes special sessions and activities such as Professional Days or desktop games TerrorGames. Since 2014, the contest also awards the MIFF Méliès d’Argent award to the best short film by the Méliès International Festivals Federation.

In 2020 the edition was made digital due to the coronavirus pandemic of 2020 in Catalonia. The main venue for content was Filmin. The screenings of short films were made on the Festival's own page within the VimeoOTT platform. It was also featured on Vimeo's main platform: TerrorKids, Institutes Screening and the Noviembre Fantasma channel, the latter in collaboration with La Semana de Cine Fantástico de Donostia and Fancine – Málaga Fantastic Film Festival. The same virtual edition would include content on YouTube (including the First Virtual 12-Hour Marathon, broadcast live). For its part, the Industry Days were held entirely through the Zoom platform.

The festival defines its activities as a vindication of culture as a tool for social transformation and, especially, the genre of horror as a cultural element. He currently organizes the classic Dotze hores de cinema de terror, different sections of feature films and short films, a Professional Industry Days Meeting between emerging filmmakers and companies in the sector, a Horror Short Stories Contest, a board game space called Molins Horror Games and a popular video contest called 20 Seconds of Horror, among others. The Festival also coordinates film essay publications and collaborates with commercial and cultural entities in his area of influence, to co-organize activities such as a live Escape room and gastronomic activities.

== Coordination with other festivals and associations ==
In 2005, the Coordinadora de Festivals i Mostres de Cinema i Vídeo de Catalunya started out including all cinema festivals and events in the country aiming at reinforcing creation, communication, financial support and organisation. In 2010, TerrorMolins started out the association of festivals Terror Arreu de Catalunya along with Cardoterror (Cardedeu), Cryptshow (Badalona), FesTerror (Lloret de Mar) and Horrorvisión (Barcelona). In 2014, the Festival became a member of the Méliès International Festivals Federation (MIFF), a federation of festivals devoted to promote cinema production, distribution and valuing. Within MIFF, the Festival awards the Méliès d'Argent award to the best European fantastic short film as well as a nomination for the Méliès d’Or to the best European fantastic short film. In 2016, the Festival started a collaboration with the Asociación de Premios de Cine Blogos de Oro; this collaboration implies that online media devoted to cinema and series would become part of the Jury of the Crítica de Oro Award of the Feature Film Official Section and include an Award of the Short Films Official Section on each edition of the Festival.

== See also ==
- List of fantastic and horror film festivals
