= British Academy Scotland New Talent Awards =

New Talent Annual Awards Ceremony

- Awarded for: The best in emerging Scottish talent
- Country: Scotland
- First award: 2009
- Website: Bafta Scotland - New Talent Awards

The British Academy Scotland New Talent Awards are presented at an annual award ceremony organised by BAFTA Scotland.

== History ==
In 2009, BAFTA Scotland held the very first British Academy Scotland New Talent Awards. The annual awards ceremony recognises, inspires and celebrates emerging practitioners from all over Scotland and gives up-and-coming talent a platform to showcase their work to industry.

The ceremony has been held in various locations including the Glasgow Film Theatre and The Arches (Glasgow). Since 2012, Muriel Gray has been the host of the ceremony. Broadcaster Kaye Adams hosted in 2011. In 2012, Chris Quick of the Glasgow Filmmakers Alliance led a campaign to get the British Academy Scotland New Talent Awards recognised by IMDb. The campaign was successful and the awards were introduced to the site later that year.

== Sponsorship ==
Various awards have been sponsored by Scottish companies specialising in specific fields. At the 2014 ceremony, the award for Best Editor was sponsored by Edit 123 and the award for Best Original Music was sponsored by PRS for Music.

== See also ==
- BAFTA Scotland
- British Academy of Film and Television Arts
