= 2021 British Academy Scotland Awards =

- Date: 20 November 2021
- Site: BBC Pacific Quay, Glasgow, Scotland
- Hosted by: Edith Bowman

Television coverage
- Network: Streaming webcast

The 31st British Academy Scotland Awards were held on 20 November 2021 at BBC Pacific Quay in a socially distanced, closed-studio show, honouring the best Scottish film and television productions of 2020. The nominations were announced by Edith Bowman on 13 October 2021.

== Nominees ==
Winners are listed first and highlighted in boldface.

Best Feature Film	Best Director (Fiction)
**Limbo**; Poly Styrene: I Am a Cliché; Run	**Ben Sharrock - Limbo**; Kevin MacDonald - The Mauritanian; Eva Riley - Perfect 10
Best Actor in Film	Best Actress in Film
**Amir El-Masry - Limbo as Omar**; Vikash Bhai - Limbo as Farhad; Mark Stanley - Run as Finnie	**Marli Siu - Run as Kelly**; Tamara Lawrance - Kindred as Charlotte; Tilda Swinton - The Personal History of David Copperfield as Betsey Trotwood
Best Entertainment	Best Features
**The Brilliant World of Tom Gates**; Scot Squad: The Chief Does Democracy; Secret Scotland	**Antiques Road Trip**; Escape to the Farm with Kate Humble; Location, Location, Location
Best Actor in Television	Best Actress in Television
**James McAvoy - Together as He**; Jack Lowden - Small Axe: Mangrove as Ian McDonald; Peter Mullan - Scenes for Survival: "Fatbaws"	**Abigail Lawrie - Tin Star: Liverpool as Anna Worth**; Kelly Macdonald - Line of Duty as DCI Joanne Davidson; Sharon Rooney - Finding Alice as Nicola
Best Writer Film/Television	Best Television Scripted
**Ben Sharrock - Limbo**; Lucy Brydon - Body of Water; Eva Riley - Perfect 10	**Adam - Cora Bissett, Louise Lockwood, Frances Poet, Carolynne Sinclair Kidd**; Beep - Jane Bell, Ian Fitzgibbon, Bryce Hart, Neil Webster; Criptales - Jack Thorne, Amit Sharma, Mat Fraser, Debbie Christiee
Best Director (Factual)	Best Specialist Factual
**David Whitney - Killing Escobar**; Stephen Bennett - Darren McGarvey's Class Wars; Matt Pinder - Murder Case	**Eye of the Storm - Anthony Baxter, Catriona Black, Colin Brown, Richard Phinney**; Ivor Cutler KT Tunstall - Alison Pinkney, Jackie Maclean, Mick McAvoy; Scotland: My Life In The Wild - Hello Halo Productions/Channel 4
Best Single Documentary	Best Short Film & Animation
**Scotland, Slavery and Statues - Parisa Urquhart, Mark Harrison, Anthea Harvey, Ceri Isfryn**; Beyond Burns - Elephant Shoe Films/BBC Scotland; The Dark Shadow of Murder - Glasgow Film Productions/BBC Scotland	**Harmonic Spectrum - Will Hewitt, Austen McCowan**; Expensive Shit - Adura Onashile, Rosie Crerar, Ciara Barry; Nevillie is Dead - Louis Paxton, Grant O'Rourke
Best News & Current Affairs	Best Factual Series
**Jabbed! Inside Britain's Vaccine Triumph - Windfall Films Scotland/Channel 4**; Davina McCall: Sex, Myths and the Menopause - Linda Sands, Katie Lander, Kate Muir, Noel Nelis; The Trial of Alex Salmond - Mick McAvoy, Alan Clements, Sarah Howitt, Lotte Murphy Johnson	**Murder Case - Matt Pinder, Iain Scollay, Audrey McColligan, Paul McGinness**; Extraordinary Escapes with Sandi Toksvig - Sandi Toksvig, Steph Harris, Julie Grant, Ed St Giles; Michael Palin: Travels of a Lifetime - Andrew Abbott, Iain Scollay, Audrey McColligan, Michael Palin
Best Game	Audience Award
**Solas 128**; Murder Mystery Machine; Phogs!	**Lawrence Chaney - RuPaul's Drag Race UK**; David Carlyle - It's a Sin; Martin Compston - Line of Duty; Jean Johansson - A Place in the Sun; Kelly Macdonald - Line of Duty; David Tennant - Des

=== Outstanding Contribution to Film & Television ===
- TBC

=== Outstanding Contribution to Craft ===
- TBC

=== Outstanding Contribution to the Scottish Industry ===
- TBC

== See also ==
- 74th British Academy Film Awards
- 93rd Academy Awards
- 27th Screen Actors Guild Awards
