= Yoko Hikasa =

Japanese voice actress and singer (born 1985)

- 日笠 陽子
- Born: July 16, 1985 (age 41); Kanagawa Prefecture, Japan
- Occupations: Voice actress; singer
- Years active: 2007–present
- Agent: i.nari
- Notable credits: High School DxD as Rias Gremory; K-On! as Mio Akiyama; Danganronpa as Kyoko Kirigiri; Infinite Stratos as Houki Shinonono; Is This a Zombie? as Seraphim; Little Witch Academia as Diana Cavendish; Shangri-La Frontier as Arthur Pencilgon/Towa Amane; The Devil Is a Part-Timer! as Emi Yusa; No Game No Life as Stephanie Dola; Jujutsu Kaisen as Utahime Iori; Shaman King as Yoh Asakura
- Spouse: Undisclosed (m. 2015; div. 2025)
- Musical career
- Genre: J-pop
- Instruments: Vocals; bass guitar
- Years active: 2007–present
- Label: Pony Canyon

Yoko Hikasa (日笠 陽子, Hikasa Yōko) (born July 16, 1985) is a Japanese voice actress and singer, known for voicing characters such as Yoh Asakura in Shaman King, Atom in Pluto, Kyoko Kirigiri in Danganronpa, Mio Akiyama in K-On!, Rias Gremory in High School DxD, Tomoe Udagawa in BanG Dream! Girls Band Party!, Emilie in Genshin Impact, Elza Forte in Aikatsu Stars!, and Hibiki Tenshō in Aikatsu Friends!.

== Biography ==
Hikasa became interested in acting while watching Sailor Moon and Neon Genesis Evangelion, which starred Megumi Hayashibara. She attended Nihon Narration Engi Kenkyūjo, a voice actor training school. She formed a pop music group Ro-Kyu-Bu!, with Kana Hanazawa, Yuka Iguchi, Rina Hidaka, and Yui Ogura. It takes the name for each characters for the anime series Ro-Kyu-Bu!. Their first single "Shoot!" was released on August 17, 2011, and was used as the opening theme for the series. The album Pure Elements was released on October 5, 2011. In December 2015, Hikasa announced her marriage. In the K-On band, "Ho-Kago Tea Time", Hikasa learned to play the bass left-handed though she is right-handed.

On January 20, 2023, Hikasa announced that she would continue working as a freelance actor following her departure from I'm Enterprise. On September 5, 2024, she founded her own agency called i.nari.

On December 31, 2025, Hikasa announced her divorce.

== Filmography ==
=== Anime ===
Year	Title	Role	Ref.
2007	Sketchbook ~full color'S~	Minamo Negishi	
2008	Ghost Hound	Female Elementary School Student B (ep 12)	
2008	Monochrome Factor	Schoolgirl (ep 5)	
2009	Asura Cryin'	Ritsu Shioizumi	
2009	Basquash!	Child B (ep 2), Nyapico (ep 1)	
2009	Birdy the Mighty Decode:02	Shrine Maiden (ep 12)	
2009	K-On!	Mio Akiyama	
2009	Modern Magic Made Simple	Mio Kisaragi (ep 2), Official (ep 4)	
2009	Nogizaka Haruka no Himitsu: Purezza	Iwai Hinasaki, Yayoi Kayahara	
2009	Toradora!	Schoolgirl (ep 18)	
2009	Umineko When They Cry	Satan	
2010	The Betrayal Knows My Name	Cartoon-character Costume (ep 11), Rina, Schoolgirl 1 (ep 8)	
2010	Chu-Bra!!	Kiyono Amahara	
2010	Demon King Daimao	Junko Hattori	
2010	Heaven's Lost Property Forte	Hiyori Kazane	
2010	MonHun Nikki Girigiri Airū-mura Airū Kiki Ippatsu	Nyaster	
2010	Occult Academy	Maya Kumashiro	
2010	Panty & Stocking with Garterbelt	Woman (ep 8A)	
2010	The Qwaser of Stigmata	Hana Katsuragi	
2010	Seitokai Yakuindomo	Shino Amakusa	
2010	Sekirei: Pure Engagement	Yashima	
2010	Stitch!: Zutto Saikō no Tomodachi	Reika	
2010	Working!!	Izumi Takanashi	
2010	Yumeiro Pâtissière	Katie Capucine	
2011	Beelzebub	Azusa Fujisaki	
2011	Dog Days	Brioche d'Arquien	
2011	Hanasaku Iroha	Enishi Shijima (young)	
2011	Infinite Stratos	Houki Shinonono	
2011	Is This a Zombie?	Seraphim	
2011	Nura: Rise of the Yokai Clan: Demon Capital	Kyōkotsu's Daughter	
2011	Manyū Hiken-chō	Oume	
2011	MonHun Nikki Girigiri Airū-mura G	Nyaster	
2011	Moshidora	Minami Kawashima	
2011	The Qwaser of Stigmata II	Hana Katsuragi	
2011	Rio: Rainbow Gate!	Linda	
2011	Ro-Kyu-Bu!	Saki Nagatsuka	
2011	Working'!!	Izumi Takanashi	
2012	Aesthetica of a Rogue Hero	Myuu Ōsawa	
2012	Bodacious Space Pirates	Lynn Lambretta	
2012	Btooom!	Hidemi Kinoshita	
2012	Campione!	Erica Blandelli	
2012	Code:Breaker	Sakura Sakurakōji	
2012	Daily Lives of High School Boys	Literature Girl	
2012	Gokujyo.	Aya Akabane	
2012	Hayate the Combat Butler: Can't Take My Eyes Off You	Kayura Tsurugino	
2012	High School DxD	Rias Gremory	
2012	Hyouka	Quiz Study Group Chairman	
2012	Inu × Boku SS	Nobara Yukinokōji	
2012	Kingdom	Kyō Kai	
2012	Love, Election and Chocolate	Kimika Haida	
2012	Is This a Zombie? of the Dead	Seraphim	
2012	Say I Love You	Female Student	
2012	Sengoku Collection	Vengeful Fang Akechi Mitsuhide	
2012	Medaka Box Abnormal	Saki Sukinasaki	
2012	Muv-Luv Alternative: Total Eclipse	Niram Rawamunando	
2012	Phi-Brain - Puzzle of God: The Orpheus Order	Mizerka	
2012	Tanken Driland	Haruka	
2013	Cuticle Detective Inaba	Gabriella	
2013	Danganronpa: The Animation	Kyoko Kirigiri	
2013	Encouragement of Climb	Kaede Saitō	
2013	The Devil Is a Part-Timer!	Emi Yusa/Emilia Justina	
2013	Flowers of Evil	Nanako Saeki	
2013	Haganai NEXT	Hinata Hidaka	
2013	Hayate the Combat Butler! Cuties	Kayura Tsurugino	
2013	High School DxD New	Rias Gremory	
2013	Infinite Stratos 2	Houki Shinonono	
2013	Karneval	Tsubaki	
2013	Majestic Prince	Kei Kugimiya	
2013	Pokémon: Black & White: Rival Destinies	Ellie	
2013	Ro-Kyu-Bu! SS	Saki Nagatsuka	
2013	Samurai Bride	Musashi Miyamoto	
2013	The Severing Crime Edge	Ruka Shihoudou	
2013	Senki Zesshō Symphogear G	Maria Cadenzavna Eve	
2013	Tamako Market	Hinako Kitashirakawa, Mari Uotani	
2014	Bladedance of Elementalers	Restia Ashdoll	
2014	Daimidaler the Sound Robot	Kyōko Sonan	
2014	Dai-Shogun - Great Revolution	Hyōgo Asai	
2014	The File of Young Kindaichi Returns	Runa Mizuki	
2014	Gonna be the Twin-Tail!!	Anko Īsuna	
2014	Girl Friend BETA	Risa Shinomiya	
2014	Hanamonogatari	Higasa	
2014	If Her Flag Breaks	Rin Eiyūzaki	
2014	M3 the dark metal	Emiru Hazaki	
2014	Mushishi: The Next Chapter	Teru	
2014	Nobunaga The Fool	Jeanne Kaguya d'Arc	
2014	No Game No Life	Stephanie Dola	
2014	Pokémon XY	Nami	
2014	Sword Art Online II	Endô	
2014	Terra Formars	Grace	
2014	Trinity Seven	Mira Yamana	
2014	Z/X Ignition	Michael	
2015	Attack on Titan: Junior High	Frieda Reiss	
2015	Bikini Warriors	Fighter	
2015	Chivalry of a Failed Knight	Kanata Totokuba	
2015	Maria the Virgin Witch, Artemis		
2015	Mobile Suit Gundam: Iron-Blooded Orphans	Lafter Frankland	
2015	My Monster Secret	Tōko Shiragami	
2015	Rampo Kitan: Game of Laplace	Kuro Tokage	
2015	Rin-ne	Rina Mizuki	
2015	Rokka: Braves of the Six Flowers	Nachetanya	
2015	Seraph of the End	Horn Skuld, Tomoe Saotome	
2015	Sound! Euphonium	Aoi Saitō, Brass Band Member	
2015	Subete ga F ni Naru	Ayako Shimada	
2015	Senki Zesshō Symphogear GX	Maria Cadenzavna Eve	
2015	Yurikuma Arashi	Kaoru Harishima	
2016	Bakuon!!	Tazuko	
2016	Berserk	Farnese	
2016	BBK/BRNK	Mami Horino / Zetsubi Hazama, Double de Vaire	
2016	Cheating Craft	Li Xing / Anri	
2016	ClassicaLoid	Kurage	
2016	Danganronpa 3: The End of Kibōgamine Gakuen	Kyoko Kirigiri	
2016	Dimension W	Cedric Morgan	
2016	Flip Flappers	Sayuri	
2016	Gate: Jieitai Kanochi nite, Kaku Tatakaeri - Enryuu-hen	Yao Haa Dusi	
2016	Hitori no Shita: The Outcast	Natsuka	
2016	Keijo	Miku Kobayakawa	
2016	Macross Delta	Claire Paddle	
2016	Magi: Adventure of Sinbad	Esra	
2016	Magical Girl Raising Project	Ruler / Sanae Mokuou	
2016	New Game!	Kō Yagami	
2016	Long Riders!	Saki Takamiya	
2016	Phantasy Star Online 2 The Animation	Echo	
2016	Undefeated Bahamut Chronicle	Relie Aingram	
2016	WWW.Working!!	Sayuri Muranushi	
2017	Aho Girl	Yoshie Hanabatake	
2017	Aikatsu Stars!	Elza Forte	
2017	Altair: A Record of Battles	Shara	
2017	The Eccentric Family 2	Gyokuran	
2017	Fuuka	Tomomi-sensei	
2017	Hand Shakers	Bind	
2017	Interviews with Monster Girls	Sakie Satō	
2017	Juni Taisen: Zodiac War	Toshiko Inō/Boar	
2017	Little Witch Academia	Diana Cavendish	
2017	Piace: My Italian Cooking	Ruri Fujiki	
2017	Re:Creators	Alicetelia February	
2017	Sakura Quest	young Chitose Oribe	
2017	Seven Mortal Sins	Greed Demon Lord Mammon	
2017	Senki Zesshō Symphogear AXZ	Maria Cadenzavna Eve	
2018	Attack on Titan Season 3	Frieda Reiss	
2018	BanG Dream! Girls Band Party! Pico	Tomoe Udagawa	
2018	Dances with the Dragons	Jivunya Lorezzo	
2018	Encouragement of Climb: Third Season	Kaede Saitō	
2018	Goblin Slayer	Witch	
2018	High School DxD Hero	Rias Gremory	
2018	Hinamatsuri	Utako	
2018	Hakyū Hoshin Engi	So Dakki	
2018	Junji Ito Collection	Riko	
2018	Layton Mystery Tanteisha: Katori no Nazotoki File	Olivia (ep 2)	
2018	Pop Team Epic	Popuko (ep 4-A)	
2018	Sword Art Online Alternative Gun Gale Online	Pitohui / Elza Kanzaki	Rei Satō (ep 12)
2019	Aikatsu Friends!	Hibiki Tenshō	
2019	Arifureta: From Commonplace to World's Strongest	Tio Klarus	
2019	BanG Dream! 2nd Season	Tomoe Udagawa	
2019	Domestic Girlfriend	Hina Tachibana	
2019	Granbelm	Anna Fugo	
2019	Isekai Cheat Magician	Grami	
2019	Is It Wrong to Try to Pick Up Girls in a Dungeon?	Freya	
2019	Magical Girl Spec-Ops Asuka	Rau Peipei	
2019	Manaria Friends	Anne	
2019	No Guns Life	Olivier Juan de Belmer	
2019	Phantasy Star Online 2: Episode Oracle	Echo	
2019	Revisions	Chiharu Isurugi	
2019	Senki Zesshō Symphogear XV	Maria Cadenzavna Eve	
2019	To the Abandoned Sacred Beasts, Liza Runecastle		
2019	W'z	Yukine	
2019	Zoids Wild Zero	Jo Aysel	
2020	BanG Dream! 3rd Season	Tomoe Udagawa	
2020	BanG Dream! Girls Band Party! Pico: Ohmori	Tomoe Udagawa	
2020	Dragon Quest: The Adventure of Dai	Zulbon	
2020	Dropout Idol Fruit Tart	Hoho Kajino	
2020	ID: Invaded	Keiko Kikuchi (ep 4)	
2020	Infinite Dendrogram	Marie Adler	
2020	Interspecies Reviewers	Aloe	
2020	Is the Order a Rabbit? BLOOM	Student Council President	
2020	Jujutsu Kaisen	Utahime Iori	
2020	Listeners	Stür Neubauten	
2020	Pocket Monsters 2019	Saitō (Bea)	
2020	Sorcerous Stabber Orphen	Azalie Cait Sith	
2020	The Irregular at Magic High School: Visitor Arc	Angelina Kudou Shields	
2020	The Millionaire Detective Balance: Unlimited	Yoko (ep 1)	
2020	Tower of God	Hwa Ryun / Karen	
2020	Wandering Witch: The Journey of Elaina	Sheila	
2021	BanG Dream! Girls Band Party! Pico Fever!	Tomoe Udagawa	
2021	The Case Study of Vanitas	Veronica de Sade	
2021	Cells at Work! Code Black	White Blood Cell (Neutrophilc)	
2021	The Great Jahy Will Not Be Defeated!	Landlord	
2021	Life Lessons with Uramichi Oniisan	Mabui Daga	
2021	Moriarty the Patriot	Irene Adler/James Bond	
2021	Night Head 2041	Kimie Kobayashi	
2021	Redo of Healer	Keara	
2021	Shaman King	Yoh Asakura	
2021	Shadows House	Dorothy	
2021	The Fruit of Evolution	Louise Balze	
2021	The Vampire Dies in No Time	Maria	
2021	Vivy: Fluorite Eye's Song	Estella	
2022	A Couple of Cuckoos	Namie Umino	
2022	Arifureta: From Commonplace to World's Strongest 2nd Season	Tio Klarus	
2022	Arknights: Prelude to Dawn	Kal'tsit	
2022	Call of the Night	Kiyosumi Shirakawa	
2022	Encouragement of Climb: Next Summit	Kaede Saitō	
2022	Extreme Hearts	RiN	
2022	Fanfare of Adolescence	Akari Sumeragi	
2022	Love Live! Nijigasaki High School Idol Club 2nd Season	Kaoruko Mifune	
2022	Love of Kill	Mifa	
2022	My Stepmom's Daughter Is My Ex	Madoka Tanesato	
2022	Orient	Kuroko Usami	
2022	Princess Connect! Re:Dive Season 2	Nozomi	
2022	RPG Real Estate	Satona	
2022	RWBY: Ice Queendom	Weiss Schnee	
2022	Summer Time Rendering	Hizuru Minakata	
2022	The Devil Is a Part-Timer!!	Emi Yusa/Emilia Justina	
2022	The Eminence in Shadow	Iris Midgar	
2022	The Genius Prince's Guide to Raising a Nation Out of Debt	Fyshe Blundell	
2023	A Galaxy Next Door	Momoka Morikuni	
2023	Giant Beasts of Ars	Romana	
2023	Goblin Slayer II	Witch	
2023	I'm in Love with the Villainess	Yu Bauer	
2023	Level 1 Demon Lord and One Room Hero	Zenia	
2023	Malevolent Spirits: Mononogatari	Karakasa no Tsukumogami	
2023	My Happy Marriage	Hazuki Kudō	
2023	Ron Kamonohashi's Forbidden Deductions	Amamiya	
2023	Shangri-La Frontier	Arthur Pencilgon/Towa Amane	
2023	Sweet Reincarnation	Brioche Salgret Mill Leteche	
2023	Jujutsu Kaisen Season 2	Utahime Iori	
2023	The Great Cleric	Cattleya	
2023	The Masterful Cat Is Depressed Again Today	Yume's Mother	
2023	The Vexations of a Shut-In Vampire Princess	Karen Helvetius	
2023	Yohane the Parhelion: Sunshine in the Mirror	Lailaps	
2023	Dark Gathering	Courtesan Spirit	
2023	Zom 100: Bucket List of the Dead	Reika	
2023	Power of Hope: PreCure Full Bloom	Bell	
2024	Arifureta: From Commonplace to World's Strongest 3rd Season	Tio Klarus	
2024	Atri: My Dear Moments	Catherine	
2024	Delicious in Dungeon	Maizuru	
2024	Demon Lord 2099	Mag Rosanta	
2024	Dragon Ball Daima	Dr. Arinsu	
2024	Fairy Tail: 100 Years Quest	Karameel	
2024	Firefighter Daigo: Rescuer in Orange	Toyomu Altonen	
2024	Gushing over Magical Girls	Lord Enorme	
2024	Highspeed Etoile	Kanata Asakawa	
2024	Kagaku×Bōken Survival	Professor Kuo	
2024	Mecha-Ude	Amaryllis	
2024	Metallic Rouge	Eva Cristella	
2024	Murai in Love	Ayano Tanaka	
2024	Shaman King: Flowers	Hana Asakura	Yoh Asakura
2024	Tasūketsu	Maria Kisaragi	
2024	The Witch and the Beast	Ione	
2024	Tōhai	Ai	
2024	Tower of God 2nd Season	Hwaryun	
2024	VTuber Legend: How I Went Viral After Forgetting to Turn Off My Stream	Hareru Asagiri	
2024	Sword Art Online Alternative Gun Gale Online II	Pitohui / Elza Kanzaki	
2025	Betrothed to My Sister's Ex	Mio	
2025	Farmagia	Lisan	
2025	Fire Force 3rd Season	Gold	
2025	Flower and Asura	Shura Saionji	
2025	Let's Play	Vikki Song	
2025	New Saga	Yūriga	
2025	Once Upon a Witch's Death	Eldora	
2025	Secrets of the Silent Witch	Bridget Greyham	
2025	The Brilliant Healer's New Life in the Shadows	Carmilla	
2025	The Fragrant Flower Blooms with Dignity	Kyoko Tsumugi	
2025	The Shy Hero and the Assassin Princesses	Yulia Maios	
2025	Zatsu Tabi: That's Journey	Riri Tenkūbashi	
2026	Chainsmoker Cat	Shoplifter	
2026	Easygoing Territory Defense by the Optimistic Lord	Panamera	
2026	Even the Student Council Has Its Holes!	Masaki Kotobuki	
2026	Hanaori-san Still Wants to Fight in the Next Life	Sakura Rokudo	
2026	Hell Teacher: Jigoku Sensei Nube	Chiyo Enga	
2026	Heroine? Saint? No, I'm an All-Works Maid (and Proud of It)!	Anna-Marie Victirium	
2026	High School! Kimengumi	Masuyo Ikari	
2026	I'm Looking for Zombies	Mikazuki	
2026	Mao	Tenko	
2026	Nia Liston: The Merciless Maiden	Fressa	
2026	Please Excuse My Younger Brothers	Azusa Yashiro	
2026	Saved by the Ice Cold Prince's Embrace	Countess Sashebal	
2026	Sentenced to Be a Hero	Neely	
2026	Smoking Behind the Supermarket with You	Maezawa	
2026	So What's Wrong with Getting Reborn as a Goblin?	Karen	
2026	Tank Chair	Newscaster	
2026	The Case Book of Arne	Amy	
2026	The Strongest Job Is Apparently Not a Hero or a Sage, but an Appraiser (Provisional)!	Ivel	
2027	Otherworldly Munchkin: Let's Speedrun the Dungeon with Only 1 HP!	Nephilia Curse	
2027	The Eternal Fool's Words of Wisdom	Pochi	
2027	The Remarried Empress	Navier	
2027	Wound & Bandage	Matsu Daemon	

=== Drama CD ===
- Wanna Be the Strongest in the World! (2011), Elena Miyazawa
- Watashi ni xx Shinasai! (2012), Yukina Himuro
- Taiyō no Ie (2012), Chihiro
- Last Game (2015–2016), Mikoto Kujō
- A Terrified Teacher at Ghoul School, Beniko Zashiki
- The Apothecary Diaries (2020), Gyokuyō

=== OVAs/ONAs ===
Year	Title	Role	Ref.
2009	Final Fantasy VII Advent Children Complete	Edge Citizen	
2012	*Code Geass: Akito the Exiled	Kousaka Ayano	
2013	*Yozakura Quartet: Tsuki ni Naku	Nadeshiko Matsudaira	
2015	Yankee-kun na Yamada-kun to Megane-chan to Majo	Hana Adachi	
2015	Comical Psychosomatic Medicine	Iyashi Kangoshi	
2016	Eyedrops	Neostigmine Methylsulfate	
2019	Miru Tights	Yua Nakabeni	
2019	7 Seeds	Hana Sugurono	
2021	Vlad Love	Jinko Sumida	
2021	High-Rise Invasion	Yayoi Kusakabe	
2022	Romantic Killer	Yukana Kishi	
2022	Bastard!! -Heavy Metal, Dark Fantasy-	Arshes Nei	
2023	Junji Ito Maniac: Japanese Tales of the Macabre	Chiemi	
2023	Pluto	Atom	
2024	Time Patrol Bon (2024), Tetsuo Shiraishi		
2024	Monogatari Off & Monster Season	Higasa	
2025	Cat's Eye	Mitsuko Asatani	
2026	Steel Ball Run: JoJo's Bizarre Adventure	Hot Pants	

=== Anime films ===
- Keroro Gunso the Super Movie 3: Keroro vs. Keroro Great Sky Duel (2008), Woman C
- Heaven's Lost Property the Movie: The Angeloid of Clockwork (2011), Hiyori Kazane
- K-On! the Movie (2011), Mio Akiyama
- Hayate the Combat Butler! Heaven Is a Place on Earth (2011), Kayura Tsurugino
- Inazuma Eleven GO vs. Danbōru Senki W (2012), Fran
- Hal (2013), Kurumi
- A Certain Magical Index: The Movie – The Miracle of Endymion (2013), Shutaura Sequenzia
- Little Witch Academia (2013), Diana Cavendish
- Planetarian: Storyteller of the Stars (2016), Job
- Majestic Prince: Genetic Awakening (2016), Kei Kugimiya
- Trinity Seven the Movie: The Eternal Library and the Alchemist Girl (2017), Mira Yamana
- Seitokai Yakuindomo: The Movie (2017), Shino Amakusa
- The Irregular at Magic High School: The Movie – The Girl Who Summons the Stars (2017), Angelina Kudou Shields
- No Game No Life: Zero (2017), Corounne Dola
- Maquia: When the Promised Flower Blooms (2018), Tita
- BanG Dream! Film Live (2019), Tomoe Udagawa
- Trinity Seven: Heavens Library & Crimson Lord (2019), Mira Yamana
- Goblin Slayer: Goblin's Crown (2020), Witch
- BanG Dream! Episode of Roselia (2021), Tomoe Udagawa
- BanG Dream! Film Live 2nd Stage (2021), Tomoe Udagawa
- Seitokai Yakuindomo: The Movie 2 (2021), Shino Amakusa
- Eien no 831 (2022), Akina
- Rakudai Majo: Fūka to Yami no Majo (2023), Megaira
- Sailor Moon Cosmos (2023), Sailor Lead Crow
- My Next Life as a Villainess: All Routes Lead to Doom! The Movie (2023), Alqus
- Mononoke the Movie: Phantom in the Rain (2024), Fuki Tokita
- Mononoke the Movie: The Ashes of Rage (2025), Fuki Tokita

=== Video games ===
- Granado Espada (2006), Berroniff
- Megazone 23: Aoi Garland (2007), Mami Nakagawa
- Ken to Mahou to Gakuen Mono (2008), Female Gnome
- K-On! Hōkago Live!! (2010), Mio Akiyama
- Danganronpa: Trigger Happy Havoc (2010), Kyōko Kirigiri
- Umineko no Naku koro ni: Majo to Suiri no Rondo (2010), Satan
- L@ve once (2010), Meru Toritome
- Black Rock Shooter: The Game (2011), Shizu
- Umineko no Naku koro ni Chiru: Shinjitsu to Gensō no Nocturne (2011), Satan
- Lollipop Chainsaw (2012), Juliet Starling (as default setting in PS3 Japanese version)
- Phantasy Star Online 2 (2012), Echo
- Senran Kagura Shinovi Versus (2013), Ryōbi
- Super Heroine Chronicle (2014), Houki Shinonono
- Granblue Fantasy (2014), Anne, Selfira
- Makai Shin Trillion (2015), Faust
- Senran Kagura: Estival Versus (2015), Ryōbi
- Valkyrie Drive: Bhikkhuni (2015), Momo Kuzuryū
- Lord of Vermilion Arena (2015), Yaiba
- 7th Dragon 2020 (2011)
  - 7th Dragon 2020-II (2013)
  - 7th Dragon III code:VFD (2016)
- Dragon Quest Heroes II (2016), Minea
- Fushigi no Gensokyo 3 (2014), Marisa Kirisame
  - Touhou Genso Wanderer (2015), Marisa Kirisame
- The Alchemist Code (2016), Agatha
  - Fushigi no Gensokyo TOD -RELOADED- (2016), Marisa Kirisame
- Super Robot Wars OG: The Moon Dwellers (2016), Katia Grineal
- Street Fighter V (2016), Laura Matsuda
- Breath of Fire 6 (2016), Protagonist (Female)
- Girls' Frontline (2016), K11, Lewis
- World of Final Fantasy (2016), Refia
- Senki Zesshō Symphogear XD Unlimited (2017), Maria Cadenzavna Eve
- Kirara Fantasia (2017), Kanna
- Infinite Stratos: Archetype Breaker (2017), Houki Shinonono
- Fire Emblem Heroes (2017), Fir, Athena
- BanG Dream! Girls Band Party! (2017), Tomoe Udagawa
- Xenoblade Chronicles 2 (2017), Nyuutsu
- BlazBlue: Cross Tag Battle (2018), Weiss Schnee
- Azur Lane (2017), USS Honolulu, USS St. Louis
- Sdorica (2018), Hyacinthus Folrey, Hyacinthus SP
- Super Neptunia RPG (2018), Kukei
- Dragalia Lost (2018), Celliera
- Arknights (2019), Kal'tsit
- Our World is Ended (2019), Yoko Ichinose
- Pokémon Masters EX (2019), Elesa
- Girls X Battle 2 – Fencer
- Fate/Grand Order (2020), Kijyo Koyo
- Another Eden (2020), Heena
- Moe! Ninja Girls RPG (2020), Enju Saion-ji
- Love Live! School Idol Festival All Stars (2020), Kaoruko Mifune
- Persona 5 Strikers (2020), Kuon Ichinose
- War of the Visions: Final Fantasy Brave Exvius (2020), Shadowlynx
- Atri: My Dear Moments (2020), Catherine
- Magia Record (2021), Tsubaki Mikoto
- The Legend of Heroes: Trails Through Daybreak (2021), Judith Lanster
- Alchemy Stars (2021), Regina, Jona
- Counter:Side (2021), Hilde
- Fairy Fencer F: Refrain Chord (2022), Glace
- The Legend of Heroes: Trails Through Daybreak II (2022), Judith Lanster
- Star Ocean: The Divine Force (2022), Malkya Trathen
- Echocalypse (2022), Niz
- Goddess of Victory: Nikke (2022), Neve, Red Hood
- Dragon Quest Treasures (2022), Bonnie, Monsters
- Fire Emblem Engage (2023), Ivy
- Cookie Run: Kingdom (2023), Blueberry Pie Cookie
- Honkai Impact 3 (2023), Vita
- Omega Strikers (2023), Estelle
- Yohane the Parhelion: Blaze in the Deepblue (2023), Lailaps
- Tevi (2023), Celia
- Epic Seven (2023), Nahkwol
- Ex Astris (2024), ZERO²
- Umamusume: Pretty Derby (2024), Orfevre
- Touhou Spell Carnival (2024), Yukari Yakumo
- Genshin Impact (2024), Emilie
- Zenless Zone Zero (2025), Evelyn Chevalier
- Like a Dragon: Pirate Yakuza in Hawaii (2025), Naomi Rich
- Wuthering Waves (2025), Augusta
- Trickcal: Chibi Go (2025), Aya

=== Dubbing roles ===
==== Live-action ====
- Against the Dark, Charlotte (Skye Bennett)
- Alex Rider, Kyra Vashenko-Chao (Marli Siu)
- Captain Marvel, Minn-Erva (Gemma Chan)
- Cleveland Abduction, Gina DeJesus (Katie Sarife)
- Escape Room: Tournament of Champions, Claire (Isabelle Fuhrman)
- Ghostbusters: Afterlife, Lucky Domingo (Celeste O'Connor)
- Ghostbusters: Frozen Empire, Lucky Domingo (Celeste O'Connor)
- Good Sam, Dr. Lex Trulie (Skye P. Marshall)
- Magadheera, Mithravinda / Indu (Kajal Aggarwal)
- The Nevers, Mary Brighton (Eleanor Tomlinson)
- Resident Evil
- Scream 4, Jill Roberts (Emma Roberts)

==== Animation ====
- Chuggington, Piper
- The Loud House, Lori and Lucy
- RWBY, Weiss Schnee

== Discography ==
=== Singles & albums ===
As the voice actor for Mio Akiyama in K-On!, she participated to four singles and two albums.

- "Cagayake! Girls" ranked #2 on Japanese Oricon singles charts.
- "Don't say 'lazy'" ranked #3 on Oricon singles charts, and was awarded Animation Kobe's "Best Song" award.
- "Light and Fluffy Time" (ふわふわ時間) ranked #3 on Oricon singles charts.
- "Mio Akiyama" (秋山澪) ranked #2 on Oricon singles charts.
- Hōkago Teatime (放課後ティータイム) ranked #1 on Oricon albums charts.

Below are singles under her own name.

- "This Beautiful Cruel World" (美しき残酷な世界, Utsukushiki Zankoku na Sekai), used as the ending theme for the anime series Attack on Titan.
- "Song That Doesn't End" (終わらない詩, Owaranai no Uta), used as the theme song for the anime movie Hal.
- "SEEK DIAMONDS" (Shiiku Daiyamonzu), used as the ending theme for the anime series Diamond no Ace.
- "EX:FUTURIZE" (Ekusu Fuyūcharaizu), used as the opening theme for the anime series Z/X Ignition.
- "Rhythm Dimension" along with Shiina-Tactix.

Below are albums under her own name.

- Glamorous Songs (July 17, 2013)
- Couleur (September 3, 2014)

=== DVD/Blu-ray ===
- Hikasa Yoko GLAMOROUS LIVE Blu-ray & DVD released date: April 16, 2014.
- Hikasa Yoko Live Tour Le Tour de Couleur Blu-ray & DVD released date: March 18, 2015.
