= Weiß Schwarz =

Japanese collectible card game

- Card back to the Weiß Schwarz TCG.
- Publisher: Bushiroad
- Type: Collectible card game
- Players: 2
- Cards: 50

Weiß Schwarz (ヴァイスシュヴァルツ, Vaisu Shuvarutsu) is a Japanese collectible card game created by Bushiroad. The game is separated into Weiß-side and Schwarz-side. "Weiß" and "Schwarz" are German for white and black, respectively.

The game’s main attraction is the fact that its different expansions contain cards from different licensed properties (manga and anime series such as Bakemonogatari, Log Horizon, Madoka, Attack on Titan, The Melancholy of Haruhi Suzumiya and Fate Stay Night, among others).

The game was launched in March 2008. It received an English release in 2013.

In 2010 Animate Times called the game "hugely popular", and noted that the game has produced 100 million cards within 21 months since its release, and 200 million after 31 months. The game was also called popular by Anime News Network in 2013 and 2021, and by GameRant in 2021.

An online version called Weiß Schwarz Online will release on March 24, 2027 for Nintendo Switch, Nintendo Switch 2, and Steam.

== Gameplay ==
The game focuses on two main aspects: character battle and clock/level which regulate what cards can be played as well as acting as a player's life points.

The game is designed for two players and an average game lasts about 10-15 minutes.

== Rules ==
=== Victory conditions ===
- The player that forces their opponent to Level 4 wins the game immediately.
- The opposing player has no cards left in their deck and Waiting Room.

=== Playing Areas ===
==== Deck Area ====
The player's deck is placed face down in this area and consists of 50 cards. Unlike other trading card games, the game does not end when a player runs out of cards in their deck. Instead, the player shuffles the cards in their waiting room to put back in the deck area.

==== Level Area ====
Cards placed in this area represent the player's level. Upon reaching level 4, the player loses.

==== Clock Area ====
When a player takes damage, the amount dealt is then added in cards to this area. This zone can hold up to six cards at time. When a seventh card is added, the player is forced to level up.

==== Stock Area ====
Cards representing "Stock" are placed in this area. Cards in this area are placed faced down after trigger checks and cannot be revised or rearranged.

==== Climax Area ====
A maximum of one face-up Climax card is allowed in this zone. During the end phase, any card in this area is sent to the Waiting Room.

==== Stage Area ====
Consists of five stage positions. Character cards are placed face-up in these areas. There are two types of Stage Areas:

- Center Stage

The three foremost positions make up the Center Stage. Character cards placed in this area can battle with opponent's Character cards directly in front of them.

- Back Stage

The two rear positions make up the Back stage. Character cards placed in this area cannot battle with opponent's Character cards. However, cards in this usually possess support abilities.

==== Waiting Room ====
Cards that have been retired/used are placed in this area. Example: Character cards defeated in battle.

==== Memory Area ====
The cards that are removed from the game are placed in this area.

=== Phases ===
Gameplay of Weiß Schwarz is broken into several phases during a player's turn:

==== Stand phase ====
All characters on the active player's Stage in [Rest] are returned to [Stand].

==== Draw phase ====
The active player draws a card from the top of his deck.

==== Clock phase ====
The active player may choose to discard one card from his hand into his/her Clock Area to draw 2 additional cards from his/her deck.

==== Main phase ====
The phase where you play and move characters or event cards and activate start up abilities/effects.

When you play a card, you have to fulfill the three conditions (level, cost, and color) in order to play the card.

==== Climax phase ====
Climax cards are played during this phase. You must have a card in either your Level Area or Clock Area that matches the color of the Climax card you wish to play in order to play it.

==== Battle phase ====
The player declares an attack of choice with their characters one at a time to damage the opponent's life points (called "Clock" in Weiß Schwarz) and also their characters (if present) at the same time.
During the first turn of the game, the player who goes first may only declare an attack with one character.
Only Characters that are in [Stand] Position and in the Center Stage, the three foremost positions, can declare attacks.
Characters declaring attack will be put to [Rest] position from [Stand] position.
The 3 different types of Attack:

- Direct Attack

This attack is the default attack when a character is attacking an empty slot.
The attacking character will gain an additional Soul Damage to the Soul Damage total.

- Front Attack

The player may choose this attack when a character is attacking and there is a character opposing it. Battle between the characters will occur and the character with the lower Power will be put to [Reverse]. Characters that are put to [Reverse] will be sent to the Waiting Room during the Encore Phase unless otherwise stated. The Soul Damage total the attacking character deals to the opposing player is equal to the character's Soul plus any additional Soul as a result of the trigger phase.

- Side Attack

The player may choose this attack when a character is attacking and there is a character opposing it. Battle between the characters will NOT occur. The attacking character will suffer a Soul Damage penalty that is equivalent to the Level of the opposing character. The Soul Damage total the attacking character deals to the opposing player is equal to the character's Soul minus the Level of the opposing character, plus any additional Soul as a result of the trigger phase.

==== Trigger phase ====
Upon declaring an attack from front attack, side attack, or direct attack, a card is flipped over from your deck as trigger to check for trigger (effect varies upon trigger) and the card goes into stock. The trigger phase occurs with the attack of each character.

==== Counter phase ====
If you declared a front attack, your opponent may play a character/event counter card, if they have one.

==== Damage phase ====
Your opponent takes damage equivalent to your soul output + soul trigger upon trigger step (if any) by flipping over cards from the top of their deck onto their clock. 7 cards on the clock raises their level by 1, and any additional damage are retained onto the next level. However, should they flip over a climax card, all the damage sustained for that damage step is canceled, and the cards are moved into the Waiting Room (discard pile) instead.

==== Character battling phase ====
This phase occurs only when a Front Attack is declared.
A Power comparison between the characters is done and the character with the lower Power is put to [Reverse].
If the Power of both battling characters are the same, both of them are put to [Reverse].

==== Encore phase ====
This phase occurs when the current player has decided to stop attacking.
All Characters that are in the [Reverse] state are sent to the Waiting Room.
Starting with the current player, both players are allowed to "revive" their characters by paying the characters' respective Encore cost.
Even when not stated, all character cards comes with a built-in ability [Auto] Encore (3), which means that a player may pay 3 cost from his/her stock to "revive" a character which has been put to [Reverse].
The Encored characters will be put back from the Waiting Room in [Rest] position to their original position on the Center Stage.

==== End phase ====
You pass on your turn to the opponent.

=== Card type ===
There are 3 main type of cards in Weiß Schwarz: character cards, event cards, and climax cards. They are further broken down into colors and level subcategories. A deck can contain up to four copies of cards with the same name, and no more than 8 climax cards per deck. The number of cards in a deck build is exactly 50.

==== Character cards ====
Character cards form the base of the gameplay, serving as your means of damaging the opponent and subsequently defeating them. Character cards have several features which include the level and cost on the top left, soul trigger on the top right, effects, color, power, soul output and traits on the bottom of the card. To play a character, you have to meet the color requirement (applies only to card level 1 and above), the cost requirement, and the level requirement.

==== Event cards ====
Event cards act as an instant play card during your main phase which may give functions like retrievals or healing effects. Event cards have to meet color and level requirements to be played.

==== Climax cards ====
Climax cards boost your soul and power damage output during your climax phase upon play, increases soul output or resource advantage upon triggering on the trigger phase, and serve as a damage canceler during the damage phase. Due to the usefulness of climax cards, a deck is capped at 8 climaxes. Climax card have to meet the color requirement to be played during the climax phase.

== Participating titles ==
=== Trial Deck/Booster Pack ===
==== Weiß Side ====
- A Certain Magical Index & A Certain Scientific Railgun
- A Certain Magical Index II & A Certain Scientific Railgun
- A Certain Scientific Railgun S
- Adventure Time
- Alice Gear Aegis Expansion
- Anemoi
- Angel Beats! & Kud Wafter
- Angel Beats! Re:Edit
- Aogiri High School
- Avatar: The Last Airbender
- Ayakashi Triangle
- BanG Dream!
- BanG Dream! Volume 2
- BanG Dream! Girls Band Party!
- BanG Dream! Girls Band Party! Volume 2
- BanG Dream! [Raise A Suilen]
- BanG Dream! Girls Band Party! [Morfonica]
- BanG Dream! Girls Band Party! 5th Anniversary
- BanG Dream! MyGO！！！！！！
- BanG Dream! Ave Mujica
- BanG Dream! MyGO！！！！！！ × Ave Mujica
- BanG Dream! [Mugendai Mewtype]
- Blue Archive
- Blue Archive the Animation
- Bocchi the Rock!
- Brown Dust 2
- Captain Tsubasa
- Cardcaptor Sakura: Clear Card
- Cardcaptor Sakura 25th Anniversary
- Charlotte
- Circus 20th Anniversary
- Da Capo del pula & Da Capo II
- Da Capo del pula & Da Capo II Plus Communication
- Da Capo III
- Da Capo 10th Anniversary Mix
- Dal Segno & Da Capo III With You
- Da Capo Re:tune
- Date A Live
- Date A Bullet
- Date A Live Volume 2
- Date A Live Volume 3
- Day Break Illusion - il sole penetra le illusioni
- Dengeki Bunko
- Fujimi Fantasia Bunko
- Fujimi Fantasia Bunko Volume 2
- Gakuen Idolm@ster
- Girl Friend Beta
- Girl Friend Beta Volume 2
- Girls und Panzer
- Heaven Burns Red
- Heaven Burns Red Volume 2
- hololive production
- hololive production Volume 2
- hololive production Volume 1 & Volume 2 Re:Mix
- Is the Order a Rabbit??
- Is the Order a Rabbit?? Dear My Sister
- Is the Order a Rabbit? Bloom
- Is the Order a Rabbit? Re:Edit
- Kadokawa Sneaker Bunko
- Kadokawa Sneaker Bunko Volume 2
- Kemono Friends
- Key 20th Anniversary
- Key all-star
- Kin-iro Mosaic
- KonoSuba: God's Blessing on this Wonderful World!
- KonoSuba: God's Blessing on this Wonderful World! 2
- KonoSuba: God's Blessing on this Wonderful World! Re:Edit
- KonoSuba: God's Blessing on this Wonderful World! Legend of Crimson
- Laid-Back Camp Season 3
- Little Busters!
- Little Busters! Ecstasy
- Little Busters! Anime
- Love Live!
- Love Live! Volume 2
- Love Live! School Idol Festival
- Love Live! School Idol Festival Volume 2
- Love Live! School Idol Festival Volume 3 ~6th Anniversary~
- Love Live! School Idol Festival 2: Miracle Live!
- Love Live! Sunshine!!
- Love Live! Sunshine!! Volume 2
- Love Live! Sunshine!! School Idol Festival ~6th Anniversary~
- Love Live! Nijigasaki High School Idol Club feat. School Idol Festival All Stars
- Love Live! Nijigasaki High School Idol Club
- Love Live! Superstar!!
- Love Live! Hasunosora Girls' High School Idol Club
- Lucky Star
- Lycoris Recoil
- Magical Girl Lyrical Nanoha A's
- Magical Girl Lyrical Nanoha The MOVIE 2nd A's
- Magical Girl Lyrical Nanoha The MOVIE 1st & 2nd A's
- Magical Girl Lyrical Nanoha Reflection
- Magical Girl Lyrical Nanoha Detonation
- Magical Girl Lyrical Nanoha StrikerS
- Makeine: Too Many Losing Heroines! Series
- Miss Kobayashi's Dragon Maid
- Nisekoi
- Phantom ~Requiem for the Phantom~
- Princess Connect! Re:Dive Anime
- Princess Connect! Re:Dive Anime Season 2
- Puella Magi Madoka Magica
- Puella Magi Madoka Magica the Movie: Rebellion
- Puella Magi Madoka Side Story: Magia Record
- Puella Magi Madoka Side Story: Magia Record Anime
- Rascal Does Not Dream of Bunny Girl Senpai
- Rascal Does Not Dream of a Dreaming Girl
- Rascal Does Not Dream of a Sister Venturing Out & Rascal Does Not Dream of a Knapsack Kid
- Rascal Does Not Dream of Santa Claus
- Rent-A-Girlfriend
- Rent-A-Girlfriend Volume 2
- Rewrite
- Rewrite Harvest festa!
- Rewrite Anime
- Robotics;Notes
- RWBY
- Saekano: How to Raise a Boring Girlfriend
- Saekano: How to Raise a Boring Girlfriend Flat
- Saekano: How to Raise a Boring Girlfriend Fine
- Shakugan no Shana
- Stella Sora
- Summer Pockets
- Summer Pockets: Reflection Blue
- Summer Pockets: Reflection Blue Re:Edit
- Summer Pockets Anime
- Symphogear
- Symphogear G
- Symphogear GX
- Symphogear XD Unlimited
- Symphogear AXZ
- Symphogear XD Unlimited Extend
- Symphogear XV
- The Day I Became a God
- The Familiar of Zero
- The Idolm@ster Cinderella Girls
- The Idolm@ster Cinderella Girls Season 2
- The Idolm@ster Cinderella Girls Next Twinkle!
- The Melancholy of Haruhi Suzumiya
- The Quintessential Quintuplets
- The Quintessential Quintuplets ∬
- The Quintessential Quintuplets Movie
- To Love-Ru Darkness 2nd
- To Love-Ru Darkness 2nd Volume 2
- Tying the Knot with an Amagami Sister
- Umamusume: Pretty Derby
- Umamusume: Pretty Derby – Beginning of a New Era
- Umamusume: Cinderella Gray
- Virtual Girl @ World'S End
- ViVid Strike!
- Vividred Operation
- Yohane the Parhelion: Sunshine in the Mirror
- Yuuna and the Haunted Hot Springs
- Zombie Land Saga

==== Schwarz Side ====
- Accel World
- Accel World: Infinite Burst
- Arifureta: From Commonplace to World's Strongest
- Assault Lily Bouquet
- Assault Lily Volume 2
- Assault Lily Last Bullet
- Attack on Titan
- Attack on Titan Volume 2
- Attack On Titan: Final Season
- Azur Lane
- Azur Lane Volume 2
- Azur Lane Volume 3
- Bakemonogatari
- Batman Ninja
- BOFURI: I Don't Want to Get Hurt, so I'll Max Out My Defense.
- Chain Chronicle ~Light of Haecceitas~
- Chainsaw Man
- Crayon Shin-chan
- D_Cide Traumerei
- D4DJ Groovy Mix
- Dandadan
- Dandadan Volume 2
- Darling in the Franxx
- Dengeki Bunko
- Detective Opera Milky Holmes
- Detective Opera Milky Holmes 2
- Detective Opera Milky Holmes Second Stage Edition
- Disgaea
- Disney Mirrorverse
- Fairy Tail
- Fairy Tail: 100 Years Quest
- Fate/stay night
- Fate/Zero
- Fate/stay night [Unlimited Blade Works]
- Fate/stay night [Unlimited Blade Works] Volume 2
- Fate/stay night: Heaven's Feel
- Fate/stay night: Heaven's Feel Volume 2
- Fate/kaleid liner Prisma Illya Zwei Herz!
- Fate/Apocrypha
- Fate/Grand Order – Absolute Demonic Front: Babylonia
- Fate/Grand Order – Divine Realm of the Round Table: Camelot
- Forbidden Door
- Frieren: Beyond Journey's End
- Frieren: Beyond Journey's End Volume 2
- GA Bunko
- Gargantia on the Verdurous Planet
- Goblin Slayer
- Goddess of Victory: Nikke
- Goddess of Victory: Nikke Volume 2
- Granblue Fantasy
- Guilty Crown
- Guilty Gear Strive
- Hatsune Miku: Project DIVA F
- Hatsune Miku: Project DIVA F 2nd
- Hatsune Miku: Colorful Stage!
- Hatsune Miku: Colorful Stage! Volume 2
- Hatsune Miku: Colorful Stage! Volume 3
- Is It Wrong to Try to Pick Up Girls in a Dungeon?
- JoJo's Bizarre Adventure: Golden Wind
- Kaguya-sama: Love Is War
- Kaguya-sama: Love Is War?
- Kaiju No. 8
- Kantai Collection
- Kantai Collection: The Second Fleet
- Kantai Collection: Arrival of the European Fleet
- Kantai Collection: The Fifth Phase
- Kill la Kill
- Kiznaiver
- Lost Decade
- Macross Frontier
- Marvel
- Marvel Volume 2
- Marvel Volume 3
- Melty Blood
- Mob Psycho 100
- Monogatari Second Season
- Mr. Osomatsu
- Mushoku Tensei: Jobless Reincarnation
- Nisemonogatari
- No Game No Life
- Oshi no Ko
- Oshi no Ko Volume 2
- Oshi no Ko Volume 3
- Overlord
- Overlord Volume 2
- Persona 3
- Persona 4
- Persona 5
- Persona 30th Anniversary
- Pixar
- Project Sakura Wars
- Puyo Puyo
- Puzzle & Dragons
- Rebuild of Evangelion
- Revue Starlight
- Revue Starlight -Re:Live-
- Revue Starlight: The Movie
- Re:Zero − Starting Life in Another World
- Re:Zero − Starting Life in Another World Volume 2
- Re:Zero − Starting Life in Another World: Memory Snow
- Re:Zero − Starting Life in Another World Volume 3
- Re:Zero − Starting Life in Another World Volume 4
- Rurouni Kenshin
- Schoolgirl Strikers
- Sengoku Basara
- Shining Force EXA
- Spy × Family
- STAR WARS
- Steins;Gate
- Sword Art Online
- Sword Art Online Volume 2
- Sword Art Online Re:Edit
- Sword Art Online: Ordinal Scale
- Sword Art Online Aliciziation
- Sword Art Online 10th Anniversary
- Sword Art Online Aliciziation Volume 2
- Sword Art Online Anime 10th Anniversary
- Sword Art Online Alternative: Gun Gale Online
- Tales of Series
- Tengen Toppa Gurren Lagann
- Terra Formars
- That Time I Got Reincarnated as a Slime
- That Time I Got Reincarnated as a Slime Volume 2
- That Time I Got Reincarnated as a Slime Volume 3
- The Eminence in Shadow
- The Fruit of Grisaia
- The Fruit of Grisaia Volume 2
- Grisaia: Phantom Trigger
- The Idolm@ster
- The Idolm@ster 2
- The Idolm@ster Anime
- The Idolm@ster Movie
- The Idolm@ster Million Live!
- The Idolm@ster Million Live! Welcome to the New St@ge
- The Idolm@ster Shiny Colors
- The Idolm@ster Shiny Colors Shine More!
- The King of Fighters
- The Seven Deadly Sins
- The Seven Deadly Sins: Revival of The Commandments
- Tokyo Revengers
- Touhou Project ~ Black and White Lotus Land.
- Toy Story 30 Years & Beyond
- World Trigger

=== Extra Pack/Extra Booster/Premium Booster ===
==== Weiß Side ====
- Angel Beats!
- Angel Beats! Volume 2
- BanG Dream! Girls Band Party!
- BanG Dream! Poppin’Party×Roselia
- BanG Dream! Morfonica×Raise A Suilen
- BanG Dream! Girls Band Party! Countdown Collection
- BanG Dream! 10th Anniversary!
- Card Game Shiyoko
- CLANNAD Volume 1
- CLANNAD Volume 2
- CLANNAD Volume 3
- Cosmic Princess Kaguya!
- Da Capo Four Seasons
- Da Capo & Da Capo II
- Da Capo & Da Capo. II Plus Communication
- Da Capo II Plus Communication
- Da Capo III Anime
- Da Capo VS. Little Busters!
- Da Capo III Theatrical Play
- Da Capo 20th Anniversary
- Dog Days
- Dog Days Dash
- Dog Days Double Dash
- Hina Logic from Luck & Logic
- Hina Logic from Luck & Logic Volume 2
- hololive production
- hololive production Summer Collection
- hololive production featuring Weiß Schwarz Ambassadors
- Is the Order a Rabbit??
- Is the Order a Rabbit? Anime 10th Anniversary
- Key 25th Anniversary
- Little Busters! Ecstasy
- Little Busters! Refrain Anime
- Little Busters! Card Mission
- Love Live!
- Love Live! Sunshine!!
- Love Live! The School Idol Movie
- Magical Girl Lyrical Nanoha The MOVIE 1st
- Nichijou - My Ordinary Life
- Nisekoi
- RWBY
- Shakugan no Shana III -FINAL-
- Shakugan no Shana
- The Familiar of Zero F
- The Girl Who Leapt Through Space/My-HiME & My-Otome
- The Girl Who Leapt Through Space/My-HiME & My-Otome Volume 2
- The Idolm@ster Cinderella Girls
- The Melancholy of Haruhi Suzumiya
- The Quintessential Quintuplets ∽

==== Schwarz Side ====
- Black Rock Shooter
- CANAAN
- Card Game Shiyoko
- Detective Opera Milky Holmes: Genius 4 Counterattack
- Detective Opera Milky Holmes: Milky Holmes Strikes Back
- Detective Opera Milky Holmes: The Empire Strikes Back
- Detective Opera Milky Holmes Fun Fun Party Pack
- Devil Survivor 2: The Animation
- Disgaea 4
- Disgaea D2
- Disney 100
- Elrentaros Wanderings
- Fairy Tail
- Fate/hollow ataraxia
- Fate/Zero
- Fate/kaleid liner Prisma Illya
- Fate/kaleid liner Prisma Illya Zwei!
- Fate/kaleid liner Prisma Illya Drei!
- Fate/kaleid liner Prisma Illya: Prisma Phantasm
- Gigant Big-Shot Tsukasa
- Girls Band Cry
- Godzilla The Animation
- Hatsune Miku ~Project DIVA~ X HD
- Hatsune Miku: Colorful Stage!
- JoJo's Bizarre Adventure: Stardust Crusaders
- JoJo's Bizarre Adventure: Stone Ocean
- Katanagatari
- Kantai Collection: Fleet in the Deep Sea, Sighted!
- Log Horizon
- Macross Delta
- Marvel
- Overlord: The Sacred Kingdom
- Overlord Original
- Persona 4
- Persona 4: The Animation
- Persona 4: The Ultimate in Mayonaka Arena
- Persona Q: Shadow of the Labyrinth
- Persona 3 Reload
- Revue Starlight -THE LIVE Ether- Delight
- Psycho-Pass
- Re:Zero − Starting Life in Another World: Frozen Bonds
- Rin-ne
- Sengoku Basara Anime
- Shining Resonance
- Sword Art Online II
- Sword Art Online II Volume 2
- Sword Art Online Alternative: Gun Gale Online II
- The Idolm@ster Dearly Stars
- The Idolm@ster Mini Character Pack 765pro
- The Idolm@ster 765pro All Stars
- The Idolm@ster Million Live!
- The Idolm@ster Shiny Colors
- Wooser's Hand-to-Mouth Life

=== Upcoming titles ===
- Beyblade X

== Video game ==
Weiss Schwarz Online was announced on 12 January 2026. It will launch with two versions, Weiss Eidtion and Schwarz Edition. It is produced by Ryota Shirai. Weiss Schwarz Online supports both multiplayer and single-player mode.

== See also ==
- Weiß Survive - the anime series about playing Weiß Schwarz
- Universal Fighting System - another card game with a similar, multi-franchise concept
