= Phogs! =

2020 video game

- Developer: Bit Loom Games
- Publisher: Coatsink
- Programmers: Henry Pullan; James Morwood
- Artist: Douglas Flinders
- Composer: Henry Pullan
- Platforms: Microsoft Windows; Nintendo Switch; PlayStation 4; Xbox One; Google Stadia; Amazon Luna
- Release: Windows, Switch, PS4, Xbox One, Stadia; December 3, 2020; Amazon Luna; November 18, 2021
- Genres: Puzzle, platform
- Modes: Single-player, multiplayer

Phogs! (stylized as PHOGS!) is a puzzle-platform video game developed by Bit Loom Games and published by Coatsink. The game was released for Windows, PlayStation 4, Xbox One, Nintendo Switch, and Google Stadia on December 3, 2020, and for Amazon Luna on November 18, 2021. In Phogs!, players control a two-headed dog called Red and Blue. Phogs! received generally favorable reviews from critics.

== Gameplay ==
Phogs! is a puzzle-platformer game where players control a dog called Red and Blue. The game can be played in local and online multiplayer. Each dog is controlled by an individual player. It can also be played in single-player, which allows a player to fully control the dog. The game's levels are split into three worlds: Food, Play, and Sleep. Each world contains six stages, and ends with a boss battle. The dog can be stretched, and can use its mouths to grab objects. Some objects can be transmitted through the dog. If one side of the dog bites onto a water pipe, the water will come out of the other mouth. Hats are purchased with golden bones, which can be found in the game's levels. Non-player characters can be found in the game. Some may ask for items in exchange for golden bones.

== Development and release ==
Phogs! was developed by Bit Loom, a studio consisting of Douglas Flinders, Henry Pullan, and James Morwood. The concept that the team had was based around competitive multiplayer. The concept involved dogs playing sports, and an early version of the game included a golfer dog. However, Bit Loom saw competitive multiplayer as a "well-worn territory", leading the team to switch to a co-op puzzle focus. Phogs! was originally supposed to contain nine worlds, but the team settled on three worlds. Bit Loom took inspiration from games such as Hohokum, Captain Toad: Treasure Tracker, and Super Mario 3D World.

Bit Loom won the Dare Academy competition at EGX 2017. They received a fully paid trip to the 2017 IndieCade festival in Los Angeles, and also received a business support package from Lindsays. The game was playable at PAX East 2018 and was featured at EGX Rezzed and EGX expos during that year. Phogs! was available again at PAX East 2019 and Nintendo's Indie World event in August.

Phogs! was set to release in June 2020, but was delayed due to the COVID-19 pandemic. The game took part in the Steam Game Festival: Summer and Autumn Edition. In November, Coatsink released three videos showing off the game's worlds. Phogs! was released for Microsoft Windows, PlayStation 4, Xbox One, Nintendo Switch, and Google Stadia on December 3. Phogs! was added to the Xbox Game Pass library on the same day. The game was released for Amazon Luna on November 18, 2021.

== Reception ==
Reception

Aggregate scores
Aggregator	Score
Metacritic	PC: 75/100 (Note: Score based on 8 reviews.); PS4: 79/100 (Note: Score based on 10 reviews.); XONE: 81/100 (Note: Score based on 8 reviews.); NS: 78/100 (Note: Score based on 14 reviews.)
OpenCritic	70% recommend

Review scores
Publication	Score
Eurogamer	Recommended
Gamezebo	4.5/5
Nintendo Life	8/10
Nintendo World Report	8/10
PC Gamer (US)	75/100
Push Square	7/10

Phogs! received generally favorable reviews, according to review aggregator Metacritic. Fellow review aggregator OpenCritic assessed that the game received strong approval, being recommended by 70% of critics.

Push Square's Stephen Tailby praised the accessibility and "neat" puzzles, but criticized the lack of challenge and the length of the game. Luke Kemp from PC Gamer described Phogs! as a mix of "gentle puzzling" and "body horror". Kemp wrote that Phogs! was a "great" choice, calling the game a "guaranteed source of fun". Gamezebo's Maria Alexander praised the controls and presentation, but felt that it could be "a bit twee for some". Alexander recommended the game for everyone, describing Phogs! as an "experience like no other".

Vikki Blake from Eurogamer praised the accessibility of the game, and called it "playful", "wholesome", and "phantastic". Kate Gray from Nintendo Life commended the "fun" puzzles. She called the level theming "detailed" and "clever". Gray criticized the technical issues of the Switch version. Steven Green, writing for Nintendo World Report, described the game as "delightful" and "unique". Green called the art style and world "charming and enjoyable", but felt the controls were "a little tough". Green also believed that the "inclusive" difficulty could have had more "variety".

=== Nominations ===
Phogs! was nominated for Best Game at the 2021 British Academy Scotland Awards.

Year	Award	Category	Result	Ref
2021	2021 British Academy Scotland Awards	Best Game	Nominated	
