= Kantai Collection =

2013 Japanese browser video game and its franchise

- Developers: Kadokawa Games (2013-4-23 - 2016); C2 Preparat (AKA KanColle Unei Chinjyufu Committee)
- Publisher: DMM.com
- Director: Kensuke Tanaka (C2 Preparat)
- Producers: Kensuke Tanaka (C2 Preparat); Michio Okamiya (DMM.com); Yoshimi Yasuda (Kadokawa Games)
- Designer: Kensuke Tanaka
- Artists: At least: 33 illustrators; 80 seiyūs
- Composers: Hiroshi Usami; Kaori Ōkoshi; Michio Okamiya
- Platforms: HTML5; Flash (formerly); Android
- Release: JP: April 23, 2013
- Genres: Online web browser game Fleet raising simulation
- Modes: Single-player, Multiplayer

Kantai Collection (Japanese: 艦隊これくしょん, Hepburn: Kantai Korekushon; lit. 'Fleet Collection'), (Note: Subtitled as "Combined Ship Girls Collection") abbreviated as KanColle (艦これ, KanKore), is a Japanese free-to-play web browser game developed by Kadokawa Games and published by DMM.com.

The central theme of the game is the representation of World War II warships personified as teenage girls and young adult women with personality characteristics reflecting the history of each ship. All of the featured ships were originally Japanese, but ships from other nations, like America and Germany, have also been implemented as the game has developed. Gameplay involves all aspects of naval warfare, including not only combat but also maintenance, repair, upgrading, resupply, morale, logistics as well as mission planning.

The game was launched on April 23, 2013. The game is available in Japan only and as of April 2015 has 3 million registered players. An Android client of the original game was released in 2016. The game has developed into a much larger media franchise; various media including multiple manga series and light novels have been released, in addition to an officially licensed tabletop role-playing game. A PlayStation Vita game was released in February 2016, and an anime television series aired its first anime from January to March 2015, with an animated film released in November 2016, and a second anime that premiered in November 2022.

== Gameplay ==
Examples of kanmusu cards used within the game, depicting (from top left to bottom right) Shimakaze, Nagato, Tenryū, Kaga, Haruna, Fubuki, Takao, Verniy, I-19, and Taihō

Top: Home shipyard interface screenshot depicting Kongō Bottom: In-game battle interface screenshot depicting Atago

The gameplay is centered upon building squadrons composed of individual characters, "ship girls" (艦娘, kanmusu), represented as cards with different attributes, and then sending said squadrons out on missions. The player takes on the role of an admiral (提督, teitoku) and organizes their fleets in battle in order to win. Combat is largely automated, and manual actions by the player include micromanagement such as building and repairing. The player can organize up to four different fleets.

The player progresses through the game by advancing through maps, gaining experience points through grinding, obtaining new ship girls whilst repairing and resupplying existing ones, and fulfilling quests to obtain resources. New equipment can be crafted, allowing the ship girls to equip different armaments depending on the situation. Acquisition of new kanmusu by the player can occur via drops on map or via crafting, and is heavily RNG-based; randomization is also a key component of the battle mechanism, map progression and equipment development. Construction, resupply and repair of ships is reliant upon four types of resources, namely fuel, ammunition, steel and bauxite; these supplies will gradually increase automatically as time passes. Players can choose to engage in expeditions, sorties, and quests to further increase their supplies as well.

Ships can be customised through the addition of various equipment within their empty slots, which add attribute bonuses and even provide special effects in some cases; such equipment include naval guns, anti-aircraft guns, torpedoes, torpedo bombers, dive bombers, fighter aircraft, seaplanes, recon planes, radars, steam turbines, special artillery shells, depth charges, sonars, drum canisters, searchlights and anti-torpedo bulges. The effectiveness of ships in combat depend on its attribute parameters, namely hitpoints, armour, evasion, aircraft capacity, speed, attack range, firepower, torpedo, anti-air, anti-submarine, line-of-sight, and luck.

Kanmusu are capable of becoming stronger as they gain experience and level up after battles, and can also be remodeled into more advanced models once they reach a certain level. Unwanted kanmusu can also be "fed" to other kanmusu through a process known as "modernization" (近代化改修, kindaika kaishu), which grants attribute bonuses to one ship in exchange for losing another. Ships can become fatigued once it accumulates after sorties; fatigued ships have decreased attributes, whilst sparkling ships have increased attributes. Fatigue can be alleviated by allowing ships some time to rest, or by recovering the fleet's morale using Japanese food supply ship Mamiya. As ships become damaged, their icons begin to blow off smoke and their clothing become visually torn and battered; in the event when a ship's durability drops down to zero, it is considered sunk, and the player will lose the ship girl. Players cannot resurrect ship girls that have been lost unless they are in possession of an emergency repair item, and are only able to re-train ships that have been lost from scratch.

Whilst the game is free-to-play, special premium bonuses can be obtained through prepaid game money and credit card microtransactions, such as repair dock expansions, home shipyard furniture tokens, ship possession limit increases, and special consumable items. Although each ship in the game has an experience level cap of Lv.99, the player is able to obtain the "marriage papers and ring" item with a monetary purchase priced at 700 yen or via a one-time special quest, which allows the player to "marry" the girl, thereby breaking the original level cap and allowing a new maximum of Lv.175, in addition to other perks such as stat boosts and decreased operating costs; this process can be repeated as many times as the player wishes, and there is no limit to the number of girls that can be "married".

Players can choose to battle against the fleets of other real-life players on the same game server via the exercise maneuvers menu. Players are also able to compete with each other's scores via in-game ranking boards, with periodical prizes for top ranking players. As of January 2016, there are 20 servers that can be played on, each named after a World War II-era Japanese naval base. The game is currently intended to be played by a Japanese domestic audience only, with the interface exclusively in the Japanese language. As of present, the game cannot be played outside Japan without the use of a VPN; utilisation of such methods to circumvent country IP restrictions and access the game breach the DMM.com online game terms of use, however. From August 2013 onwards, new player registrations were only available via periodic lottery, due to the servers being overloaded by large numbers of new registrants. After July 2015, new registrants were able to join the 20th server without the need to partake in a lottery; due to excessive player numbers, however, the new server has closed on multiple occasions.

== Ship girls ==
The main caracters are "'ship girls'" (艦娘, kanmusu), moe anthropomorphisms of World War II warships, depicted as "mecha musume" (メカ娘, Mecha girls).

Ship girls are thus the personified warships based on real-life vessels, which are explained within the game; the physical characteristics, appearances, and personalities of each of the girls correlate in some way to the historical ship, or some other related cultural elements.

For example, ships with a larger displacement tonnage, such as cruisers, battleships, and aircraft carriers, are usually depicted as young women, while smaller ships such as destroyers and coastal defense ships look and behave like pubescent girls, with a few exceptions. Their traits are also based on the historical ship they are based on; for instance, Japanese battleship Kongō frequently adds English words and phrases into her dialog as a reference to her British origins, whilst Japanese destroyer Shimakaze is depicted as a speedy girl in artworks and official print media, since Shimakaze was one of the fastest destroyers of World War II. Characters which share particular links also have similar or shared physical traits: ships of the same class or type may have similar accessories or uniforms.

Upon the game debut, a total of 94 different ship girls were available, all from the IJN, this number growing with the following updates and events, to reach a total of 316 ship girls (810 including remodels) as of September 2025, being depicted by 32 illustrators and voiced by 74 seiyūs.

The vast majority of these ships are of the Imperial Japanese Navy, with the remaining ships coming from the Imperial Japanese Army and the navies of other nations. As of January 2026, foreign navies represented in the game include (in implementation order) the Soviet Navy, Kriegsmarine, Regia Marina, United States Navy, Royal Navy, French Navy, Swedish Navy, Royal Netherlands Navy, Royal Australian Navy, Republic of China Navy, Argentine Navy, Royal Norwegian Navy, and Royal Thai Navy.

There were plans during the early stages to eventually bring additional ships from other countries, being thus added though the years. Some notable additions are:

- Soviet destroyer Verniy (Верный), first foreign vessel introduced into the game, on the 11 September 2013,
- Three German ships were added in March 2014,
- Two Italian ships were added as part of the Spring event in April 2015, with one more added in August,
- The American USS Iowa (BB-61), the first fully Allied ship, was introduced with KanColle Kai on 18 February 2016, later becoming available in the browser game's 2016 Spring event.

Different girls are illustrated by different artists; artists involved in the drawing of various characters include Shibafu, Yoshinori Shizuma, Konishi, Kūrokuro, Akemi Mikoto and 16 other artists. Fumikane Shimada, who was previously the lead character designer for Strike Witches and Girls und Panzer, created the designs and illustrations for Japanese armored aircraft carrier Taihō and the five firsts German vessels.

== Development ==
Prior to Kantai Collection, the majority of games published by DMM.com were R-18+ adult online games. In an effort to attract customers from a wider audience, DMM.com experimented with Kantai Collection in partnership with Kadokawa Games; by November 2013, Kantai Collection accounted for 30-40% of DMM.com's total online game business.

Unlike other online games in Japan, Kantai Collection was designed with the intention of not requiring players to spend money or participate in "gacha" lotteries. The purpose of this stems from Kadokawa desiring a larger target market and to establish the game as a well-known name, eventually allowing for merchandising and sales of franchise works.

Kensuke Tanaka, who prior to Kantai Collection was involved in the production and public relations for Final Fantasy X, XI and XIII, wished to create a game which involves historical elements while still appealing to the regular fans of DMM.com, namely fans of anime and manga culture, and this led him to the idea of developing a game centered on anthropomorphisms of warships.

The game had several major phases of development. The first one was posthumously named "1st Sequence (Flash mode)", and was the original game coded on an Adobe Flash engine. It was discontinued on August 15, 2018, in anticipation of the discontinuation of Flash support by Adobe, followed by the "2nd Sequence (HTML5 mode)" porting the entire game to an HTML5 engine with several reworked elements, such as a higher resolution and frame rate. This phase was further extended on October 17, 2025, with the "2nd Sequence Flight II-A mode", finally utilizing the HTTPS (SSL) security protocol instead of the basic HTTP, and incorporating a reworked fleet statistic graphic that notably finally gives player info previously only accessible through 3rd party game viewers.

== Media ==
Cover art of the first volume of Maizuru Naval District Compilation, featuring (clockwise from top-left) Atago, Yamato, Hiryū, Zuihō, and Hibiki

=== Print media ===
==== Manga ====
A bi-monthly online web manga by Ryōta Momoi began serialization from April 23, 2013, in the Famitsu Comic Clear. The manga follows a 4koma format, and features a storyline with the ship girls enrolled in schools, where senior girls teach battle techniques to their juniors. It has been updated weekly since October 2013. Ryōta Momoi's 4koma manga will be released in print book format under the title KanColle 4 cell comic: Fubuki, I will do my best! (艦隊これくしょん -艦これ- 4コマコミック 吹雪、がんばります!, Fubuki, Ganbarimasu!) beginning from December 14, 2013.

Famitsu Comic Clear has introduced an additional manga adaptation by Shōtarō Harada under the title Issued! Naval Base Communications (発令！鎮守府通信, Hatsurei! Chinjufu tsūshin) beginning from July 9, 2013.

The Famitsu website also hosts a webcomic titled KanColle Play Manga: Blazing Ships Weather (艦これプレイ漫画 艦々日和, Kankan Biyori) by Tadashi Mizumoto which focuses on gameplay aspects of Kantai Collection. It began serialization from August 23, 2013. In addition, illustrations column Kanmusu and ships large picture book (艦娘及ビ艦船大図鑑, Kanmusu oyobi Kansen Dai-zukan) with multiple illustrators at the same time as the manga has also been serialized.

A manga by Kensuke Tanaka and illustrated by Sakae Saitō titled KanColle: Someday as the Seas turn Calm (艦隊これくしょん -艦これ- いつか静かな海で, Itsuka shizuka na umi de) began serialisation in Monthly Comic Alive in the December 2013 issue (released October 28, 2013), with a focus on an original story revolving around Tenryū and Tatsuta.

In addition, another manga series by SASAYUKi featuring the title KanColle side:Kongō (艦隊これくしょん -艦これ- side:金剛) was serialized in Comptiq from the December 2013 issue (released November 9, 2013) onwards, with a story based on the adventures of battleship Kongō. It began serialisation within the May 2014 issue of Comptiq (released April 10, 2014) and was later terminated within the November 2014 issue (released October 10, 2014).

A manga titled KanColle: Torpedo Squadron Chronicles (艦隊これくしょん -艦これ- 水雷戦隊クロニクル, Suirai sentai kuronikuru) and illustrated by Yasuhiro Miyama began serialisation in the January 2014 issue (released November 9, 2013) of Comp Ace, with the plot focusing on the Akatsuki sisters.

Age Premium featured a manga publication by Nanaroku titled KanColle: nanodesu. (艦隊これくしょん -艦これ- なのです。) starting from the January 2014 issue (delivered December 9, 2013), with Inazuma as the main character. It was serialized until the May 2014 issue (delivered April 9, 2014).

A manga series titled KanColle: Shimakaze Whirlwind Girl (艦隊これくしょん -艦これ- 島風 つむじ風の少女, Shimakaze Tsumujikaze no shōjo) by Kazuma Yamazaki, Hyōbu Madoka later Kaname Yokoshima and illustrated by Kazuma Yamazaki began serialisation within the Dengeki Maoh magazine in the February 2014 issue (released December 27, 2013).

A manga series by Hiroichi titled KanColle: The perched naval base (艦隊これくしょん -艦これ- 止まり木の鎮守府, Tomarigi no chinjufu) began serialisation in the July 2014 issue (released May 27, 2014) of Dengeki Daioh, focusing on a storyline revolving around the heavy cruisers Kumano and Suzuya.

Kadokawa website also hosts a webcomic titled Loose Ship: Woman Admiral Play Diary (ゆる艦〜女提督プレイ日記〜, Yuru Kan: Onna teitoku purei nikki) by Sau Nitō and illustrated by Sōta Wakui which focuses on gameplay aspects of Kantai Collection. It began serialization from March 22, 2014, in Comic Walker.

A manga series by Miki Morinaga titled Tonight, Another Salute! (艦隊これくしょん -艦これ- 今宵もサルーテ!, Koyoi mo saruute) began serialization in the December 2018 issue (released November 10, 2018) of Comptiq, focusing on a storyline where Gambier Bay, Tashkent, and Commandant Teste discover an old bar on the naval base they're stationed at, eventually learning the skills of being bartenders and the history of cocktails. Gambier Bay uses the opportunity as a way of learning to get over her fear of the Kurita Fleet, as well to pull herself out of being too self-deprecating. Two volumes of the collected chapters have been released, and the third volume is scheduled to be released in September 2020. Currently it's also available on Comic Walker since July 10, 2019.

Kadokawa has also announced a manga series titled KanColle: Black Order (provisional) (艦隊これくしょん -艦これ- ブラックオーダー（仮）, Black Order (kari)), created by Ōto Taguchi who was previously responsible for the Mobile Suit Gundam 00 manga. However, the project was cancelled after a disagreement between the author and publisher.

Famitsu Comic Clear, DNA Comics, Comptiq and Dengeki Comics have also published numerous series of comic compilation books which each contain a collection of various one-shot manga.

==== Light novels ====
A short story series featuring aircraft carriers Zuikaku and Shōkaku written by Hiroki Uchida and illustrated by Matarō, titled KanColle: Bonds of the Wings of Cranes (艦隊これくしょん -艦これ- 鶴翼の絆, Kakuyoku no kizuna), began serialization within the January 2014 issue (released November 20, 2013) of Dragon Magazine.

A light novel based on the game with the title KanColle: Kagerō, Setting Sail! (艦隊これくしょん -艦これ- 陽炎、抜錨します！, Kagerō, batsubyō shimasu!), written by Toshihiko Tsukiji and illustrated by NOCO, was released on November 30, 2013.

A novel project featuring aircraft carriers Kaga and Akagi involving the illustrator Koruri and the authors Kei Shiide, Kazuyuki Takami and Dai Akagane has been announced, with the title KanColle: A day at a certain naval base (艦隊これくしょん -艦これ- とある鎮守府の一日, Toaru chinjufu no ichinichi). It was serialized in Comptiq between the January 2014 (released November 9, 2013) and August 2014 (released July 10, 2014) issues. A novel to share the view of the world, KanColle: 1st Carrier Division, Heading Off! (艦隊これくしょん -艦これ- 一航戦、出ます！, Ikkōsen demasu!) written by Kazuyuki Takami and illustrated by GUNP was released on November 2, 2014.

A novel series featuring light aircraft carriers Zuihō written by Yukiya Murasaki and illustrated by Satoru Arikawa, titled KanColle: Beautiful sea, Phoenix sky (艦隊これくしょん -艦これ- 瑞の海、鳳の空, Mizu no umi, ōtori no sora) was released on February 1, 2015.

=== Video games ===
==== KanColle Kai ====
KanColle Kai
- Game cover featuring Yamato (front) and Akizuki (back)
- Developer: Kadokawa Games
- Publisher: Kadokawa Games
- Producer: Kensuke Tanaka
- Platform: PlayStation Vita
- Release: JP: February 18, 2016
- Genre: Turn-based strategy
- Mode: Single-player

A single-player turn-based strategy game titled KanColle Kai (艦これ改) was announced for the PlayStation Vita during Kadokawa Games' 2013 Autumn media briefing, and following two launch delays, was finally released on February 18, 2016. The game is the second title independently created by Kadokawa Game Studio, after Natural Doctrine. KanColle Kai introduces various strategy elements such as hexagonal world maps, a new resource transfer system involving the escorting of supply ships over each game turn, player-selected difficulty settings, enemy counterattacks against the player's bases, control of over up to eight fleets on the world map, and the ability to simultaneously operate two separate fleets within some sortie maps. Existing functions from the original web browser game are also present, with major user interface changes. Menu screens feature Live2D character animations, and the player will encounter a "game over" state if all of their territories are destroyed by the enemy. The Vita game contained the original debut of USS Iowa (BB-61) as a playable ship, prior to her seasonal event implementation within the browser game.

In March 2014, financial analyst Fukuda Sōichirō of Citigroup Global Markets Japan made the prediction in a stock investor report that the PS Vita game would ship 500,000 copies, and expects that a profit of 1 billion yen be made. He also cites the ability to charge players for in-game premium items on the PS Vita platform as an upside for Kadokawa Corporation business-wise. Famitsu gave the game a review score of 29/40. The game sold 140,757 physical retail copies within the first week of release in Japan, placing first within the Japanese software sales rankings for that particular week; Dengeki Online and Famitsu both report that between 80-100% of the initial retail batch stock was sold out within the first week.

Kadokawa Games has announced that the game will be no longer sold physically in retail stores or digitally in the PlayStation Store by the end of January 2017.

==== KanColle Arcade ====
KanColle Arcade
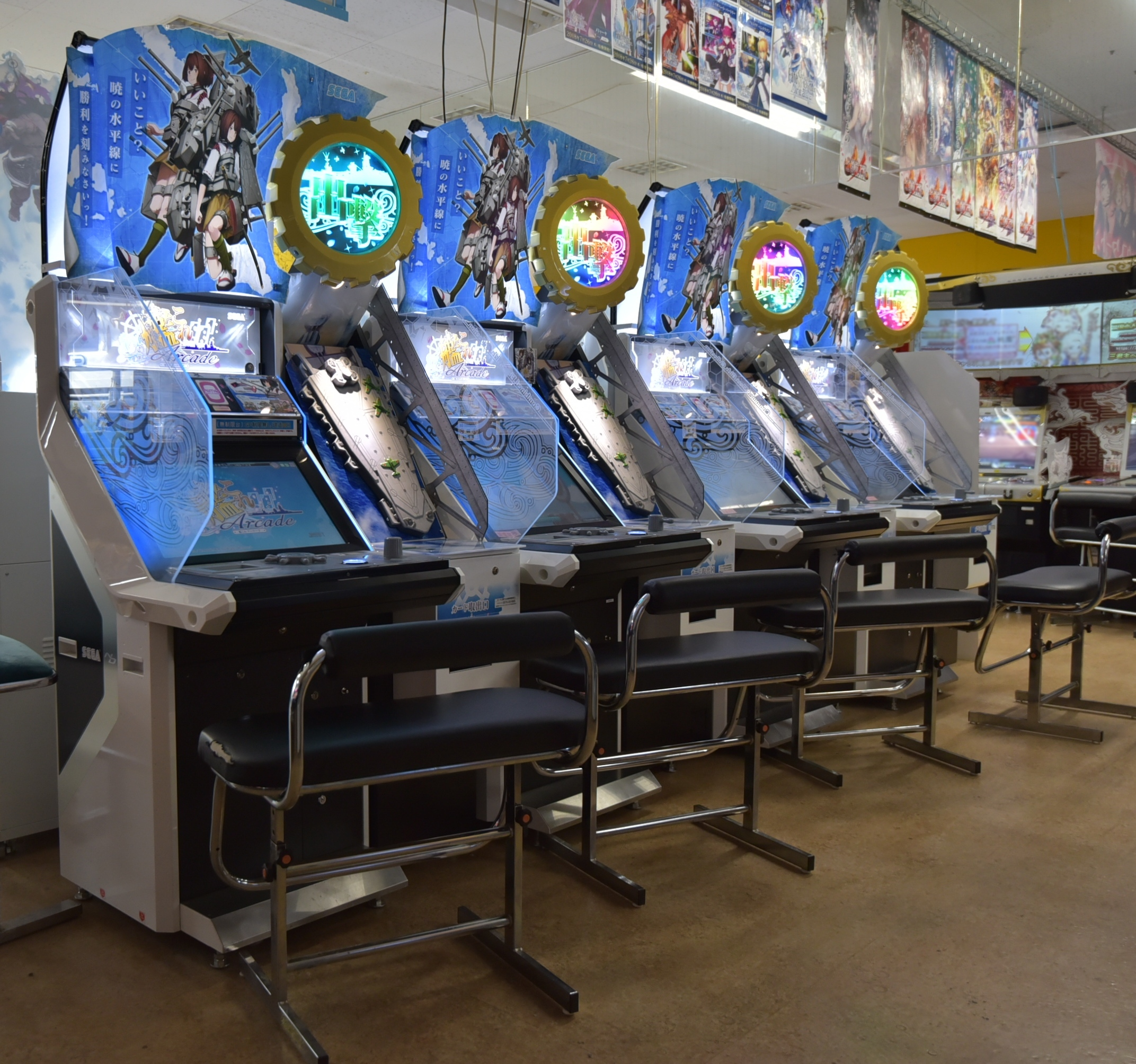
- Four KanColle Arcade cabinets
- Developer: Sega Interactive AM2
- Publisher: Sega Interactive
- Platform: Arcade
- Release: JP: April 26, 2016; EoS: 2027
- Genres: Action, Trading card
- Mode: Single-player
- Arcade system: Nu1.1

KanColle Arcade (艦これアーケード) is a trading card arcade game developed by Sega AM2 and launched on April 26, 2016. The game features fully modeled 3D characters, and involves the player taking control of the direction and speed of their ship in combat against Abyssal ships, in addition to collecting different shipgirls. The game charges players with a GP system akin to that of Border Break, where money is converted into GP at a specific rate, with these points consumed for each second of play or converted in exchange for various other game elements. The game is controlled using a steering wheel and speed lever, and the player is able to organize their fleet using kanmusu cards ejected by the arcade machine. While in combat, the player can choose between using primary and secondary armaments, torpedoes and airstrikes against foes.

Following various difficulties encountered by SEGA with its connected arcade services, it is planned to permanently close the Kancolle arcades after their final event (expected around early 2027).

=== Tabletop RPG ===
An official KanColle tabletop RPG has been developed; the introductory rulebook for the game was published by Kadokawa and Fujimi Shobo, and released on 18 March 2014. A first rule book written by Tōichiro Kawashima and illustrated by Yukio Hirai, titled Combined Ship Girls Collection RPG: Introductory Book (艦隊これくしょん -艦これ- 艦これRPG 着任ノ書, KanColle RPG: Chakunin no Sho) was released on March 18, 2014.

A replay series written by Shiei Akatoki and illustrated by Yebisu Daikanyama, titled Combined Ship Girls Collection RPG Replays: Wish Across the Sea (艦隊これくしょん -艦これ- 艦これRPGリプレイ 願いは海を越えて, KanColle RPG Replays: Negai wa Umi o Koete) was released on July 19, 2014.

A lonely replay series written by Tōichiro Kawashima and illustrated by Chino Yukimiya, titled Combined Ship Girls Collection RPG Replays of Lonely: Although the sky is so blue (艦隊これくしょん -艦これ- 艦これRPGぼっちリプレイ 空はあんなに青いのに, KanColle RPG Botchi Replays: Sora wa Anna ni Aoi no ni) was released on January 20, 2015.

=== Anime ===
An anime television series aired from January to March 2015. The series is animated by Diomedéa, and features Japanese destroyer Fubuki as the main character, with the storyline based on her point of view. The show is directed by Keizou Kusakawa, with the script written by Jukki Hanada. The anime series features the voice cast from the original game.

A second anime that features Japanese destroyer Shigure as the main character was announced on January 4, 2019. The series is produced by ENGI and directed by Kazuya Miura, with scripts written by Kensuke Tanaka, the game's original writer, character designs handled by Chika Nomi, and music composed by Kaori Ohkoshi. It aired from November 2022 to March 2023 and ran for eight episodes.
The title is 『"KanColle" 1944 -I・TSU・KA・A・NO・U・MI・DE-』

=== Audio CDs ===
An original game soundtrack KanColle Original Sound Track: Dawn (艦隊これくしょん -艦これ- KanColle Original Sound Track 暁, KanColle Original Sound Track: Akatsuki) was released on August 3, 2014. Second original game soundtrack KanColle Original Sound Track 2: Wind (艦隊これくしょん -艦これ- KanColle Original Sound Track II 風, KanColle Original Sound Track 2: Kaze) was released on August 5, 2015.

Two vocal music collection CDs KanColle Ship Girl Feelings Song 1: KanColle Vocal Collection, Volume 1 (艦隊これくしょん -艦これ- 艦娘想歌【壱】 KanColle Vocal Collection vol.1, KanColle Kanmusu Sōka 1: KanColle Vocal Collection, Vol.1) and KanColle Ship Girl Feelings Song 2: KanColle Vocal Collection, Volume 2 (艦隊これくしょん -艦これ- 艦娘想歌【弐】 KanColle Vocal Collection vol.2, KanColle Kanmusu Sōka 2: KanColle Vocal Collection, Vol.2) have also been released on August 3, 2014.

Limited edition versions of the side:Kongō and Torpedo Squadron Chronicles manga series tankōbon were bundled with drama CDs featuring original dialogue stories from the characters' original voice actors, titled "Hiei makes curry" (比叡、カレーを作る, Hiei, karē o tsukuru) and "Akatsuki's dream" (暁の夢, Akatsuki no yume).

An anime television soundtrack Television Anime "KanColle" Original Sound Track: Ship Sound (TVアニメ「艦隊これくしょん -艦これ-」オリジナルサウンドトラック "艦響", TV anime "KanColle" Original Sound Track: Kankyō) was released on March 25, 2015. An anime television vocal music collection CD Television Anime "KanColle" Character Song: Ship Girl's Song (TVアニメ「艦隊これくしょん -艦これ-」キャラクターソング "艦娘乃歌", TV anime "KanColle" Character Song: Kanmusu no Uta) was released on March 25, 2015.

=== Film ===
An animated film, titled KanColle: The Movie (劇場版 艦これ, Gekijō-ban KanKore), was released on November 26, 2016.

== Plot and setting ==
Whilst the original game does not have a particular storyline, and largely focuses on "gameplay", each of the official media works feature various settings with separate and differing canons. Not only do the stories differ, but also the depictions and interpretations of ship girls and the manner in which they engage in combat. The game does not strictly define anything relating to its setting, allowing for a greater diversity of secondary literary adaptation works which cater to different audiences, and more artistic freedom among secondary works which can approach the setting of Kantai Collection differently.

Kadokawa has not officially announced whether any secondary work is absolute canon, nor have they released significant quantities of canonical material, with some official works even contradicting one another. For instance, some manga anthology depictions show the ship girls as ship-sized giants, while other serialized manga show them as human-sized. The television animation explains the ship girls as humans born with the ability to possess the spirits of World War II warships, while within the Bonds of the Wings of Cranes light novel, the girls refer to themselves as actual warships, and that their origin is unknown.

=== 2015 anime television series ===
The contents of the 2022–2023 second anime are also dealt with in this article.

=== KanColle: Bonds of the Wings of Cranes ===
Within the story of the light novel Bonds of the Wings of Cranes, the setting is within an alternate universe where World War II never took place. The fleet of the Abyss, consisting of monster ships, lock down access to the seas and indiscriminately fire upon vessels and aircraft, and feed on the corpses of dead sailors in the water. The large number of abyssals, along with their regenerating ability, allowed them to easily defeat the conventional navies and modern militaries of the world. Ship girls are the guardians of humanity and human-weapon hybrids that are summoned using spirit energy (霊力), with female forms as the ships they represent have female souls. Zuikaku, having taken a humanoid form, remembers a time where she was once a ship, however, does not know the reason behind her human form.

The ship girls live within an old-fashioned Japanese-style hotel which doubles as the girls' dormitory and is close to a nearby factory which services combat equipment. The admiral of the fleet is a young man who behaves like a pervert, fond of groping the ship girls and playing with their skirts, although his personality does become serious when commanding the fleet. As the ship girls and abyssal fleets engage in combat, both sides are guarded by a protective barrier. The aircraft carriers Akagi and Kaga are depicted as firing archery arrows from a bow which then transform into fighter planes. Armaments are detachable equipment, and when not in combat gear the ships otherwise appear as ordinary girls.

=== KanColle: Kagerō, Setting Sail! ===
This light novel is set within a universe based on the real world, where normal girls undergo training to become ship girls. Hundreds of warships were destroyed by abyssal forces which spontaneously emerge from anywhere under the sea, and as a result, ship girls are employed to counter the threat.

=== KanColle: Someday as the Seas turn Calm ===
A series of mini-arcs connecting a ship girl to her existing counterpart by gradually introducing characters and rotating the leads. Within this manga, ship girls are depicted as flying on the water surface whilst in combat against the abyss fleet of monster ships, and launch aircraft managed by tiny fairies in a conventional takeoff manner from their body attachments. Artillery and torpedo combat is shown to be performed at long range, whilst anti-submarine warfare takes place in close quarters.

=== Torpedo Squadron Chronicles ===
This manga adaptation focuses on the adventures of the Tenryū class and Akatsuki class, as it follows the newly assigned Tenryū and her new squadron in solving the mystery of the Abyssal Fleet.

=== KanColle: Shimakaze Whirlwind Girl ===
This manga depicts the story of a newly appointed, rookie officer by the name of Ensign Akai who arrives at the Maizuru Naval Base for duty as the assistant to the vice-admiral, however has to deal with a stubborn and difficult Shimakaze who spends most of her time alone, and does not have any friends. Multiple nations around the world have developed ship girls for their navy power, and Maizuru is one of the major bases of Japan responsible for managing them.

=== KanColle: Fubuki, Ganbarimasu! ===
This slice of life 4koma depicts the everyday life of the ship girls at the fleet training school, where newly manufactured ship girls spend one year learning knowledge before setting out to sea. Most of the scenarios are taken from the point of view of Fubuki, and feature the girls doing fun things with one another, which include attending school, drinking tea, celebrating various holidays like Tanabata, Halloween and Christmas, in addition to the occasional sortie. The ship girls retain memories of their previous lives from World War II, at times displaying signs of post-traumatic stress disorder. References to their personal histories and characteristics are common and usually used to comedic effect. This manga depicts the ship girls as being able to walk on the surface of the water in a manner akin to ice-skating, just like in the anime series.

== Merchandise and other collaborations ==
Merchandise based on the game have been launched as a result of the success of the online game, proliferation of derivative works, and strong interest in the franchise. PVC figurines have been released, including Nendoroid and Figma figurines of both Shimakaze and Akagi, in addition to a 1/7 scale PVC display figurine of a severely damaged Kongō designed and manufactured by Max Factory. An expansion for a trading card game Weiß Schwarz based on Kancolle theme was released on March 28, 2014, and reportedly sold 1.7 million packets within its first shipment.

In September 2013, a collaborative project between Kantai Collection and the Arpeggio of Blue Steel anime was announced. Illustrators for Kantai Collection are responsible for drawing some of the anime end cards for Arpeggio of Blue Steel, which feature crossovers with Kantai Collection characters. An Arpeggio of Blue Steel in-game special event for Kantai Collection also took place from December 24, 2013, to January 8, 2014.

=== JMSDF ===
The Japan Maritime Self-Defense Force (JMSDF) has an official collaboration with Kantai Collection, notably using girls from the franchise as mascorts for their ship using the same name. When the next ship to bear the Kaga name, the Izumo-class helicopter carrier destroyer JS Kaga, was launched in 2015, the staff shared official art on Twitter of Kantai Collection Kaga holding a scale model of the new Kaga the day after she was launched. She has since become a mascot for her successor, which continued when Kaga participated in the Indo Southeast Asia Deployment (ISEAD) exercise in 2018 where she sailed to the Philippines, Singapore, Indonesia, India and Sri Lanka. Upon her return to Kure, Kantai Collection provided new art of Kaga wearing her predecessor's insignia, with her rigging updated to match that of the new ship and featuring helicopters instead of World War II aircraft. The girl Shigure is even the official mascot for the Sasebo Naval District.

== Reception ==
=== Player population ===
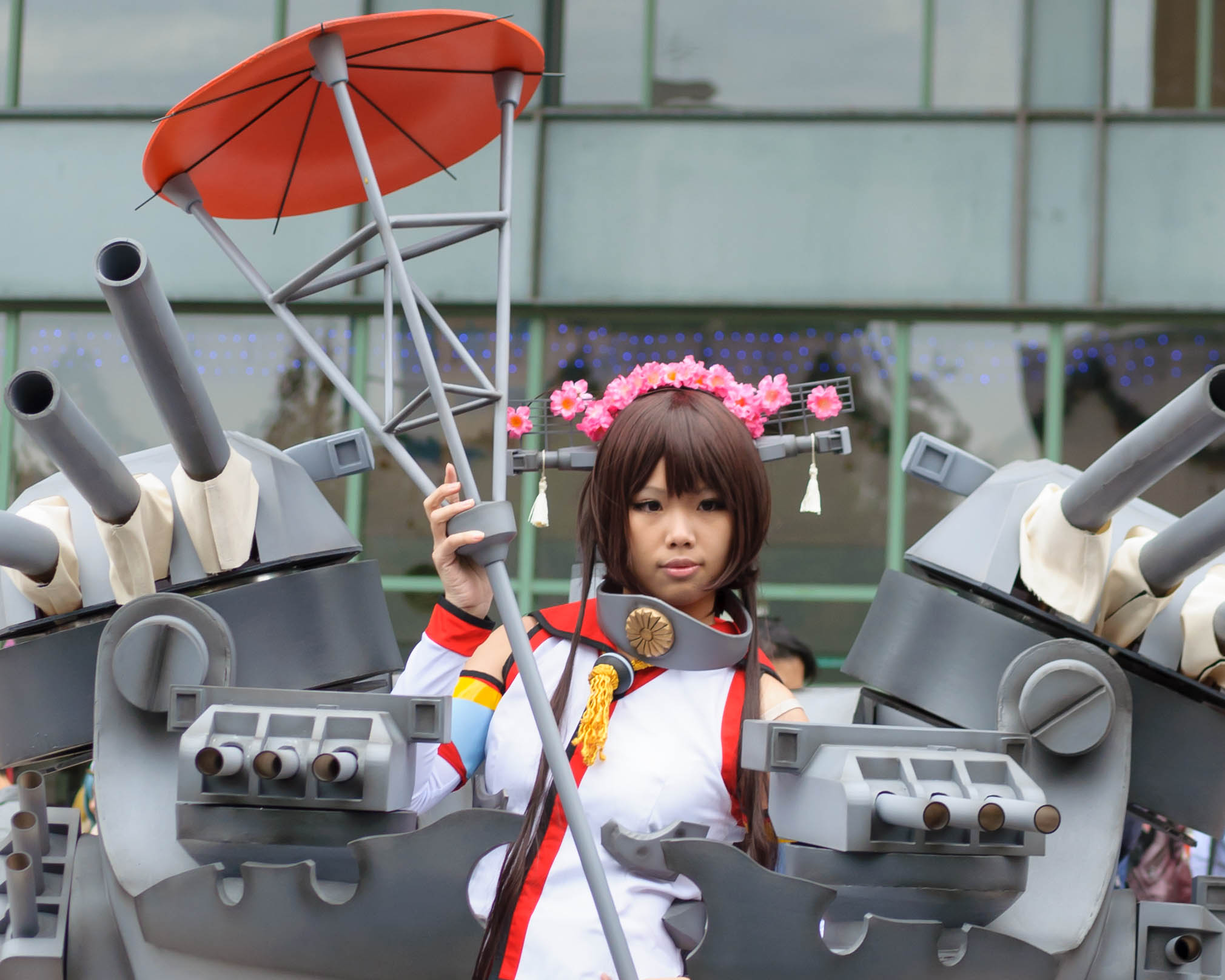
Cosplay of Yamato, based on the Japanese battleship of that name

Due to the high popularity of the game within Japan, game operators created larger numbers of servers in early 2013 to cope with the influx of players. During August 2013, the number of new players spiked by 100,000 people within one week, to a total of 600,000 people, with 350,000 daily active players. By September 2013, it was reported that there were more than 800,000 players regularly active. The total number of players broke 1,000,000 on 9 October 2013. As of April 2015, there were 3 million players. One commonly cited explanation behind the success of the game is that players are not forced to spend money to play, unlike other popular Japanese online games; the free-to-play nature of Kantai Collection makes in-game purchases optional, and not a necessity. It is estimated that on average, Kantai Collection players spend less money on the game compared to the popular Japanese games Puzzle & Dragons, The Idolmaster Cinderella Girls and Love Live! School Idol Festival.

=== Cultural trends and industry reception ===
A graph comparing the participation of dōjin circles at Comiket 85 (Winter 2013),
the first Comiket event with a significant KanColle presence

A graph comparing the number of dōjin circles with Kantai Collection works
from Comiket 84 onwards

Interest in Kantai Collection has significantly risen over the months following its release, to the point where it has often been compared with the fandom of Touhou Project as an emerging viral fandom. There has been a large increase in online activity and fan-created material relating to the game, such as fan-made artworks, doujinshi and other derivative content. As of April 2015, there are over 345,000 different artworks on Pixiv tagged with "KanColle" created by 67,000 individual artists, and KanColle-related videos on Niconico were watched 460 million times. During Comiket 85, there were 1,136 dōjin circles producing works for Kantai Collection, placing third behind Touhou Project (2,272 circles) and Kuroko's Basketball (1,462 circles), and ahead of The Idolmaster and Vocaloid; this is a significant increase over the previous Comiket 84 event, which only had just over 100 circles with Kantai Collection works. Dōjin material relating to the game have also gained traction overseas; KanColle-exclusive dōjin events have been held in Shanghai on 22 February 2014, and Taipei on 29 March 2014.

On 12 December 2013, Twitter officially released the top hashtags of 2013; #艦これ was the most used hashtag among Japanese Twitter users. The game was also the eighth most searched term within Japan on Google in 2013. On 30 December 2013, GameSpark named Kantai Collection as the online game category title for its game of the year awards of 2013, ahead of runners-up League of Legends, World of Tanks and Final Fantasy XIV: A Realm Reborn. A survey of 151 different prominent Japanese game developers conducted by 4gamer asked what each developer considered to be the best game of 2013; nine of these developers selected Kantai Collection. Among these developers, Naoki Yoshida of Square Enix, who produced and directed Final Fantasy XIV: A Realm Reborn, stated that Kantai Collection is Japan's answer to World of Tanks, and that he was impressed by the business model; meanwhile, Hatsune Miku: Project DIVA director Seiji Hayashi of Sega referred to the game as "innovative". Kantai Collection was named "Rookie of the Year" during the WebMoney 2013 Awards, as a new entrant to the games market.

=== Financial reception and sales figures ===
Speaking at a symposium held by Kadokawa ASCII Research Institute on 27 September 2013, the chairman of the board of directors of Kadokawa Group Holdings, Tsuguhiko Kadokawa, stated that despite the game's popularity, Kantai Collection is nearly unprofitable for the company, in part due to the game being funded by various company partnerships, such as the profit-sharing agreement made between Kadokawa Group and DMM Group, given that none of the game's development fees were paid for by Kadokawa. Kadokawa's stock price rose by 1000 yen within June 2013, following the initial rise of the game. It is expected that Kadokawa will need to rely on sales of intellectual property media works such as books and manga in order to raise profits. Kadokawa Games president Yoshimi Yasuda affirms that the free-to-play business model of the game will not change despite reports of a lack of revenue gain.

Meanwhile, game distributor DMM Corporation gained 7 billion yen from the game as of June 2014, which is equivalent to 140 times the value of the game's development costs.

Toshihiko Tsukiji's light novel Kantai Collection: Kagerō, Setting Sail! sold 16,624 copies within its first week of release, placing 11th place within the Oricon book ranking charts. Also debuting the same week were the Sasebo Naval District Compilation Vol.1 and Maizuru Naval District Compilation Vol.1 comic anthologies, which sold 59,552 copies and 58,110 copies respectively. In mid-November 2013, Yokosuka Naval District Compilation Vol.1 sold 48,909 copies during its first week, placing 10th place among all comic sales. The first manga volume of Fubuki, Ganbarimasu! sold 28,324 copies within its first week in December 2013. The KanColle White Paper official book published by Kadokawa placed third overall within the Oricon book charts during its debut week in October 2013, selling 46,039 copies.

=== Political commentary ===
An editorial within the South Korean Hankook Ilbo on 4 November 2013 accuses that the strong popularity of the game is due to a conservative political shift amongst young people in Japan following long-term economic recession and political instability, and that the game glorifies the wartime Imperial Japanese Navy. Addressing the Hankook Ilbo allegation, Akky Akimoto writing for The Japan Times disagrees with the idea that the game's design deliberately facilitates any political shift, and argues that the 1970s anime series Space Battleship Yamato was subject to similar criticisms despite having little effect on domestic politics.

Another opinion piece from the Asahi Shimbun suggests that the game's unforgiving mechanics, such as ships permanently sinking, with some of them even tracing their grandparents' military service history, help players understand the brutality of war given the desperate situations, so that they can gain a more positive understanding of history or even oppose conflict itself.

=== Intellectual property infringement outside Japan ===
In January 2015, allegations arose that the company Beijing Longzhu Digital Technology (北京龙珠数码科技), which runs an unofficial pirated KanColle server in mainland China, spent CN¥700,000 (US$112,800) in purchasing various Chinese-language KanColle internet forums such as the KanColle subforum on Baidu Tieba; online discussion boards intended for discussing the original Japanese game were closed down or placed under new management, while the forums of the pirated bootleg Chinese KanColle remained online. This led to widespread unrest amongst Chinese players of the original game, resulting in large-scale internet raids on forums and social media, distributed denial-of-service attacks, and website defacing via SQL injection by hackers against those running the bootleg server. An article published by China Central Television referred to the incident as the largest online mass boycott and protest against intellectual property infringement in China, and a wake-up call for the Chinese gaming industry as a whole to strive for integrity and refrain from creating copycat works.

== See also ==
- Azur Lane, a shoot 'em up game also utilizing the concept of warship moe anthropomorphization, mainly featuring anthropomorphized American, British, Japanese and German warships of World War II
- Girls' Frontline, a strategy role-playing game centred upon moe anthropomorphizations of firearms
- Tōken Ranbu, a clone of Kantai Collection anthropomorphizing historical swords as attractive young men
