= Ben Sharrock =

Scottish film director and writer

- Occupations: Director, writer, producer
- Years active: 2015–present

Ben Sharrock is a Scottish film director and writer. He is best known for his work on the films Pikadero and Limbo. He has been nominated for two BAFTA Film Awards.

== Career ==
Ben graduated from the University of Edinburgh with a degree in Arabic and Politics, and holds an MA in Film Directing and an MFA in Advanced Film Practice from Screen Academy Scotland, for which he received the Rafford Scholarship and University Medal for Outstanding Achievement. He was inducted into Edinburgh Napier University’s Hall of Fame in 2022. In 2015, he wrote and directed his debut feature, Pikadero, which premiered at the San Sebastian Film Festival.

In 2020, Sharrock wrote and directed his second feature film, Limbo, which premiered at the 73rd annual Cannes Film Festival.

== Filmography ==
| Year | Title | Director | Writer | Producer | Note |
|---|---|---|---|---|---|
| 2015 | Patata Tortilla | ✓ | ✓ | | Short film |
| 2015 | Pikadero | ✓ | ✓ | | Feature film |
| 2020 | Limbo | ✓ | ✓ | | Feature film |

== Awards and nominations ==
| Year | Result | Award | Category | Work | Ref. |
|---|---|---|---|---|---|
| 2015 | Won | BAFTA Scotland | Best Drama and Best Writer | Patata Tortilla | |
| 2015 | Won | Kyiv International Film Festival "Molodist" | Best Feature Film and FIPRESCI Prize | Pikadero | |
| 2015 | Won | Zurich Film Festival | Critics' Choice Award | Pikadero | |
| 2016 | Won | Edinburgh International Film Festival | Michael Powell Award | Pikadero | |
| 2016 | Won | Brussels International Film Festival | Cineuropa Award | Pikadero | |
| 2020 | Won | Cairo International Film Festival | Best Film, Best Artistic Contribution and FIPRESCI Prize | Limbo | |
| 2020 | Won | San Sebastián International Film Festival | Youth Jury Award | Limbo | |
| 2020 | Nominated | Zurich Film Festival | Best International Feature Film | Limbo | |
| 2021 | Nominated | BAFTA Film Awards | Outstanding Debut by a British Writer, Director or Producer | Limbo | |
| 2021 | Nominated | BAFTA Film Awards | Outstanding British Film | Limbo | |
| 2021 | Won | Pula Film Festival | Critic's Award | Limbo | |
| 2021 | Won | Brussels International Film Festival | Grand Prix | Limbo | |
| 2021 | Won | Macau International Movie Festival | Best Film and Best Screenplay | Limbo | |
| 2021 | Won | BAFTA Scotland | Best Director, Best Writer and Best Feature Film | Limbo | |
