= Marli Siu =

Scottish actress (born 1993)

- Siu at the 2026 BFI London Film Festival
- Born: 11 March 1993 (age 33); Edinburgh, Scotland
- Education: Edinburgh Napier University
- Occupation: Actress
- Years active: 2015–present

Marli Siu (born 11 March 1993) is a Scottish actress. For her performance in the film Run (2019), she won a Scottish BAFTA. Her other films include Anna and the Apocalypse (2017), Our Ladies (2019) and Wicker (2026). On television, Siu appeared in the spy thriller Alex Rider (2020–2024) and the BBC drama Everything I Know About Love (2022).

== Early life and education ==
Siu was born on 11 March 1993 in Edinburgh and lived in Lamma Island, Hong Kong until she was four years old, before returning to Scotland, where she grew up in Forres, Moray. She attended Forres Academy. Her mother is Scottish from Edinburgh and her father was Chinese. She has four sisters.

Siu attended a youth theatre group in Elgin and joined the National Youth Theatre, and graduated with a Bachelor of Arts in Acting and English Literature from Edinburgh Napier University.

== Career ==
In 2015, Siu appeared in the short film Scoring, by Screen Academy Scotland, for which she was nominated for the ‘Under 25: Fresh Blood Award’ at the Underwire Film Festival. Her theatre credits include Dead Letter Office, Some Company (co-writer), Much Ado About Nothing, Dundee Repertory Theatre (Ian Charleson Awards commendation) and The Ocean at the End of the Lane, The Royal National Theatre.

Siu moved to London in 2017, where she played Echo for 38 episodes of the CBBC web series Dixi. Her first major movie role came in 2017, when she played Lisa in John McPhail's zombie musical Anna and the Apocalypse, performing the song It's That Time of Year. The film premiered at the Fantastic Fest in Austin, Texas, and was released in the UK for Christmas 2018. Siu was named as one of the 15th Screen International's Stars of Tomorrow 2018 an annual talent showcase that spotlights up-and-coming British and Irish actors, writers, directors and producers from the UK and Ireland.

In 2019, Siu starred in the film Run, which premiered at the 2019 Tribeca Film Festival on 26 April in New York City. Later that year Siu starred in two films selected to be screened at the 2019 London Film Festival, Run and Our Ladies both due for an upcoming cinema release.

In 2020, Siu starred as Kyra, a student from Point Blanc, in the IMDb television teen spy series Alex Rider. Kyra teams up with Alex (Otto Farrant) and plays an important role in all three series.

== Filmography ==
=== Film ===
Year	Title	Role	Notes
2014	Scoring	Katja	Short film
2014	Run	Lily	Short film
2017	Anna and the Apocalypse	Lisa	
2019	Run	Kelly	
2019	Our Ladies	Kylah	
2022	A90	Annette	Short film
2024	Apartment 7A	Annie Leung	
2024	Cold Snap	Anna	Short film
2026	Wicker	Tailor's Wife’s sister	
TBA	Black Church Bay	Kelly	Post-production

=== Television ===
Year	Title	Role	Notes
2016	Still Game	Sally	Episode: "Heavy Petting"
2017	Dixi	Echo	Series 4; 38 episodes
2019	Grantchester	Karla Read	Episode: #4.3
2020–2024	Alex Rider	Kyra Vashenko-Chao	Series 1–3; 18 episodes
2021	The Irregulars	Susan Shipley	Episode: "Chapter One: An Unkindness in London"
2022	Everything I Know About Love	Nell	7 episodes
2026	Twenty Twenty Six	Mia So	6 episodes

== Stage ==
Year	Title	Role	Notes
2017	Misalliance	Hytapia	Orange Tree Theatre, Richmond
2016	Much Ado About Nothing	Hero	Dundee Repertory Theatre, Dundee
2019–2020	The Ocean at the End of the Lane	Lettie Hempstock	Royal National Theatre, London
2024–2025	The Cherry Orchard	Varya	Donmar Warehouse and St. Ann's Warehouse

== Awards and nominations ==
Year	Award	Category	Nominated work	Result	Ref.
2014	Southampton International Film Festival	Best Supporting Actress in a Short Film	Run (Short film)	Nominated	
2015	Underwire Film Festival	Best Under 25 Award	Scoring	Nominated	
2016	Ian Charleson Awards		Much Ado About Nothing	Nominated	
2018	Screen International	Stars of Tomorrow 2018		Won	
2018	Toronto After Dark Film Festival	Best Ensemble Cast (shared)	Anna and the Apocalypse	Won	
2019	CinEuphoria Awards (shared)	Best Ensemble - International Competition	Anna and the Apocalypse	Nominated	
2019	Fangoria Chainsaw Awards	Best Supporting Actress	Anna and the Apocalypse	Nominated	
2021	British Academy Scotland Awards 2021	Scottish BAFTA - Best Actress – Film	Run	Won	
2022	British Academy Scotland Awards 2022	Scottish BAFTA - Best Actress – Film	Our Ladies	Nominated	
