= Run (2019 film) =

- Film poster
- Directed by: Scott Graham
- Written by: Scott Graham
- Produced by: Margaret Matheson; Ciara Barry; Rosie Crerar
- Starring: Mark Stanley; Amy Manson; Marli Siu; Anders Hayward
- Cinematography: Simon Tindall
- Edited by: David Arthur
- Production company: Film Constellation
- Release date: April 2019 (Tribeca)
- Country: United Kingdom
- Language: English

Run is a 2019 British drama thriller film. It is directed by Scott Graham, and stars Mark Stanley and Amy Manson. The producers are Margaret Matheson, Rosie Crerar and Ciara Barry.

Principal photography was completed in April 2018, produced under the title We Don't Talk About Love. The film premiered at the 2019 Tribeca Film Festival.

As of October 2021, 80% of the 15 reviews compiled by Rotten Tomatoes are positive, and have an average score of 6.8/10.
