= Limbo (2020 film) =

2020 British comedy-drama film

- Official poster
- Directed by: Ben Sharrock
- Written by: Ben Sharrock
- Produced by: Irune Gurtubai; Angus Lamont
- Starring: Amir El-Masry; Vikash Bhai; Ola Orebiyi; Kwabena Ansah; Kenneth Collard; Kais Nashef; Sidse Babett Knudsen
- Cinematography: Nick Cooke
- Edited by: Karel Dolak; Lucia Zucchetti
- Music by: Hutch Demouilpied
- Production companies: Film4; BFI; Creative Scotland; Caravan Cinema
- Distributed by: Mubi
- Release dates: 12 September 2020 (TIFF); 30 July 2021 (United Kingdom)
- Running time: 103 minutes
- Country: United Kingdom
- Language: English
- Box office: $921,894

Limbo is a 2020 Scottish comedy-drama film, directed by Ben Sharrock. The film centres on four asylum seekers who are staying on a remote island in Scotland, and taking cultural awareness classes, while awaiting the processing of their refugee claims.

The film was named as an Official Selection of the 2020 Cannes Film Festival, but was not screened due to the cancellation of the physical festival in light of the COVID-19 pandemic.

The film received generally positive reviews and garnered several awards and nominations, including at the Cairo International Film Festival, the British Independent Film Awards, and the British Academy Film Awards.

== Plot ==
On a fictional remote Scottish island, a group of refugees are placed in a temporary residence as they await the results of their asylum claims.

At the heart of the story is Omar, a Syrian musician who is unable to work during his asylum process. He carries his oud, a Middle Eastern string instrument, with him at all times. As the film unfolds, it becomes apparent that Omar's hand is injured and doubts arise about his ability to play the oud. He frequently uses the only available pay phone to speak with his parents in Istanbul, who share concerns about his safety as well as the well-being of his brother Nabil. Nabil's involvement as a soldier in the Syrian civil war adds an underlying tension, as it contrasts with Omar's decision to leave the country. Omar's parents encouraged his emigration to the United Kingdom, hoping that his musical talent could help preserve an essential part of Syrian culture. However, as the film progresses, his father begins to question whether they would have been better off joining the fight. Throughout much of the movie, Nabil's whereabouts remain unknown, intensifying the uncertainty and emotional strain experienced by Omar and his family.

Living in a sparsely furnished and transient house, Omar shares his living space with three other men. Farhad, a Zoroastrian Afghan asylum seeker who idolizes Freddie Mercury, has been waiting for a decision on his case for 32 months. He brings home a stolen chicken that he names Freddie Jr. The other two men are Abedi, a 17-year-old from Ghana, and Wasef, a Nigerian.

The daily lives of the men are relatively uneventful. They attend awkward cultural awareness classes led by Helga and Boris. They share their dreams with each other—Wasef aspires to play football for Chelsea F.C.—and ponder whether their remote location is a deliberate attempt to "break" them. They are aware that as single men, they are considered low priority. Their leisure time is spent watching episodes of the television show Friends, which sparks intense debates between Abedi and Wasef regarding relationship dynamics.

== Cast ==
- Amir El-Masry as Omar
- Vikash Bhai as Farhad
- Ola Orebiyi as Wasef
- Kwabena Ansah as Abedi
- Kenneth Collard as Boris
- Kais Nashef as Nabil
- Sidse Babett Knudsen as Helga

== Release ==
The film had its world premiere at the Toronto International Film Festival on 12 September 2020. Prior to, Mubi acquired U.K. and Irish distribution rights to the film. It was initially set to world premiere at the Cannes Film Festival in May 2020, prior to its cancellation due to the COVID-19 pandemic. In February 2021, Focus Features acquired worldwide distribution rights excluding the United Kingdom, Ireland, Australia and New Zealand to the film. It was released in the United States on 30 April 2021, and the United Kingdom on 30 July 2021.

== Reception ==
On review aggregator Rotten Tomatoes, the film holds an approval rating of 93% based on 123 critic reviews, with an average rating of 7.9/10. The site's critical consensus reads, "A profoundly uplifting portrait of the refugee experience, Limbo is distinguished by its offbeat tone -- and overall impressive work from debuting director Ben Sharrock."

Peter Bradshaw of The Guardian praised Limbo's "elegant deadpan style established from the outset" and notes that "Sharrock soon gets you to invest in the characters and care deeply about what happens to them. Limbo is about refugees and asylum seekers in Britain, and it's a bracingly internationalist and non-parochial piece of work: film-making with a bold view on the world but also as gentle and intimate as a much-loved sitcom... This is superlative film-making from Sharrock."

Time's Stephanie Zacharek described Limbo as a "wry and tender comedy" and highlights the film's dry wit reminiscent of Bill Forsyth's comedies. In his review for The Wrap, Alonso Duralde praises the film for its exquisite craftsmanship and notes that it skillfully balances comedy and tragedy and that it "handles real-life issues from a place of real compassion and understanding without reducing its characters to mere metaphor." Tomris Laffly of RogerEbert.com rated the film 3.5 out of 4 stars and described it as a "humanistic, tenderly deadpan plunge into the psyche of a Syrian refugee." She praised Sharrock for successfully navigating the complexities of the migrant crisis while avoiding "potential hazards like a patronizing tone and cultural insensitivity." Laffly concludes her review by stating that "Sharrock’s ending feels a bit abrupt and minor" although this doesn't "undercut the time you will have spent amongst his lovable dreamers on a stark yet paradoxically beautiful place frozen in time." IndieWire's Eric Kohn graded the film a B. He praised El-Masry’s "tender, understated performance" and lauds Sharrock's approach and avoidance of bland sentimentality. In his conclusion, Kohn also notes a "rushed, inevitable climax that falls short of the more sophisticated set of experiences leading up to it."

== Accolades ==
Year	Award	Category	Recipient	Result	Ref.
2020	Cairo International Film Festival	Best Film (FIPRESCI Prize)	Ben Sharrock	Won	
2020	Cairo International Film Festival	Best Film (Golden Pyramid)	Ben Sharrock, Irune Gurtubai, Angus Lamont	Won	
2020	Cairo International Film Festival	Best Artistic Contribution	Ben Sharrock	Won	
2020	BFI London Film Festival	Audience Award	Ben Sharrock, Irune Gurtubai, Angus Lamont	Nominated	
2020	San Sebastián International Film Festival	Youth Jury Award	Ben Sharrock	Won	
2020	Zurich Film Festival	Best International Feature Film	Ben Sharrock	Nominated	
2021	Goteborg Film Festival	Best Film	Ben Sharrock	Nominated	
2021	British Academy Film Awards	BAFTA Award for Outstanding British Film	Ben Sharrock, Irune Gurtubai, Angus Lamont	Nominated	
2021	British Academy Film Awards	BAFTA Award for Outstanding Debut by a British Writer, Director or Producer	Ben Sharrock, Irune Gurtubai	Nominated	
2021	British Independent Film Awards	Breakthrough Producer	Irune Gurtubai	Won	
2021	British Independent Film Awards	Best Actor	Amir El-Masry	Nominated	
2021	British Independent Film Awards	Best Casting	Dan Jackson	Nominated	
2021	British Independent Film Awards	Best Cinematography	Nick Cooke	Nominated	
