= List of Sword Art Online Alternative: Gun Gale Online episodes =

Cover art for the first North American home media volume of Sword Art Online Alternative: Gun Gale Online

Sword Art Online Alternative: Gun Gale Online is a Japanese anime television series based on the light novel series of the same name written by Keiichi Sigsawa and illustrated by Kouhaku Kuroboshi. The series is a spin-off of Reki Kawahara's Sword Art Online light novel series and its adaptation was announced at the Dengeki Bunko Fall Festival 2017 event in October 2017. It is produced by Egg Firm and animated by studio 3Hz, directed by Masayuki Sakoi, and written by Yōsuke Kuroda, with character designs by Yoshio Kosakai. The series aired from April 8 to July 1, 2018, (Note: Tokyo MX listed the series premiere on April 7, 2018 at 24:00, which is effectively April 8 at midnight JST) on Tokyo MX and other networks. The anime series was released on six home video sets with two episodes each, for a total of 12 episodes. Aniplex of America licensed and simulcasts the series on Crunchyroll and Hulu. Anime Limited announced that they had licensed the series for release in the United Kingdom and Ireland. Madman Entertainment licensed the series for release in Australia and New Zealand, and simulcasts it on AnimeLab. The opening theme song is "Ryūsei" (流星; lit. 'Meteor') performed by Eir Aoi, while the ending theme song is "To See the Future" performed by Tomori Kusunoki.

A second season was announced at the Dengeki Bunko 30th anniversary event in July 2023. The main staff returned from the first season, with A-1 Pictures as the animation studio, replacing 3Hz. It premiered on October 5, 2024. (Note: Tokyo MX lists the second season's premiere on October 4, 2024, at 24:00, which is effectively October 5 at midnight JST)

== Series overview ==
Season	Episodes	Originally released	
Season	Episodes	First released	Last released
1	12	April 8, 2018	July 1, 2018
2	12	October 5, 2024	December 21, 2024

== Episodes ==
=== Season 1 (2018) ===
No. overall	No. in season	Title	Directed by (Note: Production staff information is taken from the ending credits of each episode)	Storyboarded by	Original release date
1	1	"Squad Jam"; Transliteration: "Sukuwaddo・Jamu" (Japanese: スクワッド・ジャム)	Takahiro Majima	Masayuki Sakoi	April 8, 2018
In the online virtual reality game, Gun Gale Online, a girl with the username LLENN participates in a team-based Squad Jam event alongside her teammate M. Taking cover, the two observe as one skilled team takes out another, deducing that they must be combat pros using GGO to gain battle experience. While the other teams eliminate each other, LLENN and M retreat to the residential area to come up with a plan against the pros. Using her small stature and quick speed to her advantage, LLENN launches a surprise attack on the pro team, leading the survivors to resign. In the real world, LLENN's user, Karen Kohiruimaki receives praise for her efforts.
2	2	"GGO"	Hidemi Yamashita	Masayuki Sakoi	April 15, 2018
Karen Kohiruimaki, who has a complex about her tall height, takes up an interest in VR gaming, but ends up constantly panicking and logging out whenever her LLENN avatar turns out to be too tall or otherwise outrageous. After going through several games, Karen eventually tries Gun Gale Online and becomes delighted with the diminutive avatar that's generated for her, only to discover that the game she picked is one of gunfire and survival. Deciding to stick with the game anyway, Karen gradually improves her skill and updates her outfit to a pink color to suit her taste. Upon finding herself surrounded by other players, LLENN manages to defeat them using pink camouflage and high speed, quickly gaining a reputation as "The Pink Devil". Later, LLENN is befriended by another female player named Pitohui, who helps her pick out a new gun which she nicknames P-chan. Forming a squadron together, Pitohui makes a promise with LLENN that if she can manage to defeat her one day, they will meet each other in real life.
3	3	"Fan Letter"; Transliteration: "Fan Retā" (Japanese: ファンレター)	Takuma Suzuki	Hiroyuki Shimazu	April 22, 2018
Pitohui tells LLENN about the upcoming Squad Jam team battle royale tournament, inspired by the events of the previous Ballet of Bullets tournament. Unable to participate due to real life obligations, Pitohui suggests that LLENN should enter the tournament in a team with another male player. After her friend fails to get her tickets to a concert taking place on the same day, LLENN agrees to enter the tournament, meeting up with her arranged partner, M, while also learning she has been appointed as the team leader as part of a strategy. Later, Karen writes a fan letter to singer Elsa Kanzaki, whose concert she couldn't attend, detailing how her songs had helped her through hard times. On the day of the Squad Jam, M gives LLENN a combat knife to use as a backup weapon before the tournament gets underway.
4	4	"Death Game"; Transliteration: "Desu Gēmu" (Japanese: デスゲーム)	Yasuhiro Noda	Hiroyuki Shimazu	April 29, 2018
With three teams remaining in Squad Jam, LLENN and M find themselves up against another team using hovercraft. Using a shield for cover, M uses his skills as a sniper to take out the opposing team without relying on the game's assist systems. Just as the two are suddenly ambushed by the remaining team, SHINC, and retreat to a mountain area, where M reads a letter and attempts to kill LLENN.
5	5	"Leave the Last Battle to Me"; Transliteration: "Rasuto Batoru wa Watashi ni" (Japanese: ラストバトルは私に)	Norihiko Nagahama	Masayuki Sakoi	May 6, 2018
Managing to reverse the situation by activating the safety on M's gun, LLENN is surprised to find M caving under pressure when questioned about his actions. M, who reveals his true nature, explains that he was frightened over what Pitohui would do to him in real life if he dies in the game, so he attempted to kill LLENN in order to become leader and surrender. Leaving M alone, LLENN tries to take on SHINC herself, only to get caught up in their trap. Realizing she cannot run away, LLENN faces SHINC head on, soon receiving backup from M. Coming down to a final battle against the remaining member, LLENN is protected by P-chan and wins using the knife she received from M. Later in the real world, Karen gets a haircut to symbolize overcoming her complex while also meeting a group of high school girls, who are revealed to be the team she faced in GGO.
6	6	"SAO Loser"; Transliteration: "Esu-Ā-Ō Rūzā" (Japanese: SAO失敗者(ルーザー))	Tomonori Mine	Yasuhiro Irie	May 20, 2018
The rhythm athletics club who LLENN faced in the Squad Jam as SHINC come over to Karen's place to learn her secrets. Later, as Karen receives news about the next Squad Jam event while heading home to Hokkaido to see her parents, she is approached by M's real life persona, Gōshi Asōgi. He explains how Pitohui became obsessed with Sword Art Online during its beta test, becoming enraged when she was unable to take part in the death game that was the SAO Incident. Believing that Pitohui intends to commit suicide if she dies during the next Squad Jam, Gōshi asks Karen to defeat Pitohui in order to fulfil their promise to meet up in real-life. Agreeing to help, Karen calls upon her best friend Miyu Shinohara, aka Fukaziroh, to form a team with her.
7	7	"Second Squad Jam"; Transliteration: "Sekando・Sukuwaddo・Jamu" (Japanese: セカンド・スクワッド・ジャム)	Sumito Sasaki	Hiroaki Shimura	May 27, 2018
Receiving some funds from Gōshi upon her arrival in GGO, Fukaziroh decides to buy a pair of grenade launchers as her main weapons. On the day of Squad Jam 2, LLENN has a brief confrontation with Pitohui before the tournament gets underway.
8	8	"Booby Trap"; Transliteration: "Būbī Torappu" (Japanese: ブービートラップ)	Takuma Suzuki	Hiroyuki Shimazu	June 3, 2018
Squad Jam 2 begins with LLENN's team and Pitohui's team starting on opposite ends of the playing field. Fukaziroh quickly runs into trouble when her legs are temporarily blown off by a booby trap, but LLENN manages to take out the first opposing team without too much trouble. The pair then head to a train station, where LLENN gives Fukaziroh directions to launch grenades at the enemy. After discovering that seven teams have gathered around the base of the mountain, LLENN deduces they are all working with each other to take down Pitohui.
9	9	"Ten Minute Massacre"; Transliteration: "Juppunkan no Ōsatsu" (Japanese: 十分間の鏖殺)	Kazuma Satō	Yasuhiro Irie	June 10, 2018
Undeterred by the number of opposing teams, Pitohui and her team launch an ambush on them, taking them all out within ten minutes. Meanwhile, LLENN and Fukaziroh make their way through a dome, having to resort to using a smokescreen tactic when they are discovered. After taking out the other players in the dome, the girls end up having to deal with the remaining player, Clarence, for her remaining magazines, before coming up against the skilled MMTM team.
10	10	"The Devil's Comeback"; Transliteration: "Maō Fukkatsu" (Japanese: 魔王復活)	Masayuki Iimura	Masayuki Sakoi	June 17, 2018
Helped out by SHINC's Eva, who forces MMTM to retreat, LLENN explains the situation concerning Pitohui to her. Following this, Eva leads SHINC in an assault against PM4, using one of their dead teammate's body as a pedestal an anti-tank rifle to destroy M's shield. This provides LLENN with the opportunity to make a beeline towards Pitohui, only for another team's sniper to hit her first, bringing her down to a sliver of health. With Pitohui passed out and MMTM closing in on their location, the rest of PM4 sacrifice themselves to protect Pitohui before she regains consciousness.
11	11	"Psycho LLENN"; Transliteration: "Ikareta Ren" (Japanese: イカれたレン)	Hidemi Yamashita	Hiroyuki Shimazu	June 24, 2018
After Pitohui finishes off MMTM all by herself, Fukaziroh pins an uncertain LLENN in place while she and the rest of SHINC launch an attack on Pitohui and M. Although SHINC gets wiped out, LLENN is motivated into action, luring out Pitohui and M as they pursue her in a vehicle. Just as LLENN is cornered, Fukaziroh comes to her rescue in her own vehicle, resulting in a car chase between hot geysers that culminates in a one-on-one confrontation between LLENN and Pitohui.
12	12	"Applause"; Transliteration: "Hakushu" (Japanese: 拍手)	Masayuki Iimura	Masayuki Sakoi	July 1, 2018
Pitohui's attempt at killing LLENN with her own weapon backfires when P-chan self-destructs, but she still manages to put a stop to LLENN's counterattacks before killing M for his betrayal. However, Fukaziroh manages to give LLENN the opportunity to deal Pitohui a fatal blow, reminding her of their promise before finishing her off. After Squad Jam 2 ends with LLENN's team ending up in second place due to a sneak attack by the remaining team, Goushi invites Karen and Miyu to meet with the real-life Pitohui, explaining how he formed a masochistic relationship with her. Goushi brings the two to Elsa Kanzaki's, where it is revealed that Elsa is Pitohui herself. Although Karen had already figured out Pitohui's identity due to Elsa and Goushi knowing details that they would only know from reading her fan letter, she is taken aback when Elsa kisses her. A post-credits scene shows LLENN and Pitohui back in Gun Gale Online as they enjoy the game again together.

=== Season 2 (2024) ===
No. overall	No. in season	Title	Directed by	Storyboarded by	Original release date
13	1	"What Happens Twice Will Happen Thrice"; Transliteration: "Ni do Aru Kotowa San do Aru" (Japanese: 二度あることは三度ある)	Kazuho Kunimoto	Masayuki Sakoi	October 5, 2024
With the Third Squad Jam beginning, Pitohui convinces LLENN and Fukaziroh to join her and M's team "LPFM" so they can cooperate rather than compete against each other. LLENN is hesitant until Pitohui reminds her of her promise to have a rematch against Team SHINC. Meanwhile, other teams make their preparations for the Squad Jam as well while Fukaziroh warns LLENN that the Third Squad Jam will introduce new secret rules as teams are eliminated. As the teams begin to assemble, a man approaches the winners of the previous Squad Jam, T-S, and passes on a secret message to them. Meanwhile, LLENN's team makes their last minute preparations as the Third Squad Jam officially starts.
14	2	"The Great Freight Car Operation"; Transliteration: "Dai Kasha Sakusen" (Japanese: 大貨車作戦)	Yūki Nishiyama	Yūki Nishiyama	October 12, 2024
LPFM find themselves on an island with an unknown region at the center they nickname the "Black Box". They also discover that the island is slowly sinking, which will eventually funnel all the teams towards the Black Box. Once the first satellite scan starts, LPFM find themselves surrounded by an alliance of teams determined to take them out first. A member in the audience reveals he arranged for the weaker teams to ally against the stronger ones. LLENN distracts the enemies giving time for the rest of LPFM to take cover in an armored freight car, which they use as a strongpoint to eliminate the other teams. However, despite being in a strong defensive position, LPFM have no choice but to keep moving as the island continues to sink.
15	3	"Clarence and Shirley"; Transliteration: "Kurarensu to Shārī" (Japanese: クラレンスとシャーリー)	Daisuke Tsukushi	Kenichi Kawamura	October 19, 2024
With the ocean closing in, M tells LPFM they have no choice but to attack the remnants of the allied teams head on to escape. Meanwhile, Clarence joins the alliance and advises them to split up into smaller teams to completely surround LPFM. However, once the teams split up, Clarence betrays them on a whim and kills most of the allies. Shirley also intervenes, killing the remaining allies with custom sniper bullets that can kill in one shot as she is determined to get revenge on Pitohui. While they are both trying to escape the ocean, Clarence and Shirley end up encountering and mutually killing each other. With Shirley dead, the rest of her team is either killed or decides to resign.
16	4	"A Special Rule Launched"; Transliteration: "Tokubetsu Rūru, Hatsudō" (Japanese: 特別ルール、発動)	Daisuke Tsukushi	Hirohide Shikishima	October 26, 2024
LPFM manage to commandeer a truck to escape the trainyard and discover Shirley and Clarence's bodies, surmising they eliminated their opposition before killing each other. Meanwhile, in the southeast corner of the island, SHINC observes an enemy team launching flares and quickly deduce they are calling for backup. They wipe out the team and steal their flares, using them to lure the rest of the enemy teams into ambushes. Elsewhere on the island, Team MMTM uses their stealth tactics to wipe out their foese, while Team ZEMAL mount their machine guns on makeshift armored shopping carts to get an edge over their opponents. T-S end up being stranded on top of a skyscraper after their area floods. With the number of teams reduced, the organizers announce the first special rule: one member of each of the remaining teams will be designated a "traitor", and the traitors will be organized into a new team with a different win condition. Pitohui reveals that she has been chosen as LPFM's traitor, and is ecstatic at the thought of battling LLENN again.
17	5	"BTRY's Choice"; Transliteration: "Bitoreiyāzu・Choisu (Note: Betrayers' Choice)" (Japanese: ビトレイヤーズ・チョイス)	Kazuho Kunimoto	Hiromitsu Kanazawa	November 2, 2024
Pitohui from LPFM, Eva from SHINC, Elvin from T-S, Tomtom from ZEMAL, David from MMTM, and Cole from TOMS are selected to be the "Betrayers". They are transported to the secret area at the center of the map, which is revealed to be a grounded cruise liner named There is Still Time. As the other teams rush to the ship to escape the rising tide, Pitohui takes charge of the betrayers and names their team "BTRY". Meanwhile, LPFM and the other teams stop a safe distance away from the ship to plan their next moves. M advises that they stay in cover and wait for another team to advance first to draw BTRY's fire so they can make a dash for one of the entrances to the ship. However, the other teams have the same idea and wait for the others to make the first move. Realizing their advantage is keeping the other teams off the ship, Pitohui begins dropping the ship's lifeboats, blocking off the entrances and causing the other teams to panic.
18	6	"The Offensive and Defensive Battle That Still Has Time"; Transliteration: "Mada Jikan wa Aru Kōbōsen" (Japanese: まだ時間はある攻防戦)	Shigehisa Iida	Shigehisa Iida	November 9, 2024
All of the teams make a run for the ship as Pitohui and David cut the lifeboats loose. Eva, Elvin, Tomtom, and Cole do their best to repel the other teams. Tomtom and Cole end up getting killed by return fire. TOMS is wiped out trying to ally with ZEMAL when the latter find out they have no appreciation for machine guns. When TomTom is killed, ZEMAL loses any interest in taking the ship and instead decide to fight each other, ending with the team wiping itself out. MMTM and SHINC manage to reach the ship after losing a single member each. LPFM manages to reach the ship with no casualties. Meanwhile, with their team no longer at full strength, Pitohui has them fortify themselves in the ship's bridge. The ship's AI Clara then activates, and Pitohui orders it to keep all of the watertight doors open, guaranteeing the ship will sink within two hours. She also decides to listen to Elvin's request and sets the ship's course to where T-S is stranded. Belowdecks, the other teams wait for the scan and LPFM and SHINC are shocked to find that they are right next to each other. Both teams engage, and while Fukaziroh as able to blast most of SHINC with a grenade, the surviving member attacks M, strangling him while using his body as a human shield to prevent LLENN and Fukaziroh from shooting her.
19	7	"Turn Over"; Transliteration: "Tān・Ōbā" (Japanese: ターン・オーバー)	Takanori Yano	Hironori Tanaka	November 16, 2024
M is able to shake off the last SHINC member and she accidentally kills herself with her own grenade. Meanwhile MMTM attempt to storm the bridge, but Pitohui lures them into a trap and kills them with electrified fire sprinklers. She then sends the rest of BTRY to confirm MMTM's deaths and takes the chance to rest, still being fatigued from a live concert she performed the previous day. She then orders Clara to ram the building T-S is trapped on, eliminating the entire team. A shocked Elvin returns to the bridge to confront Pitohui, only to be killed by her. Realizing that Pitohui has betrayed them, David heads off to confront her while Eva decides to go fight LLENN as they promised. David engages in a photon sword duel with Pithoui, but is ultimately defeated. Pitohui then destroys Clara and the ship's controls. LPFM confronts Pitohui, and she reveals that she isn't the actual traitor, LLENN is. She simply bluffed her way into BTRY, with LLENN staying silent and assuming they were both picked as traitors. Pitohui then returns to LPFM, teaming up with M and Fukaziroh against LLENN. LLENN becomes furious at Pitohui's duplicity, which is exactly what Pitohui wants, but their standoff is interrupted by Eva's intervention as she helps LLENN escape.
20	8	"The Showdown"; Transliteration: "Kettō" (Japanese: 決闘)	Yūki Nishiyama	Masayuki Sakoi	November 23, 2024
Eva reveals she figured out LLENN is the real traitor and teams up with her. Meanwhile, Pitohui orders M to withdraw and support the "true winner" so she and Fukaziroh can have a fair two on two battle with LLENN and Eva. During a short break, Pitohui confides to Fukaziroh that LLENN and Kirito, who she encountered during Sword Art Online's beta test, are the only two people she truly respects and fears. After the satellite scan, they realize that LLENN had circled around them and she sets off a series of explosives that break the ship in two and accelerate its sinking. LLENN and Eva then link up and pin down Pitohui and Fukaziroh. Eva and Fukaziroh manage to mutually kill each other, leaving LLENN and Pitohui to duel each other one on one. As the ship sinks further into the sea, LLENN and Pitohui are eventually forced to battle each other in melee combat. LLENN is able to get the upper hand on Pitohui by disabling her with Eva's knife, and ultimately kills her by throwing her off the ship. M, following Pitohui's orders, sacrifices himself to ensure LLENN wins Squad Jam 3. Afterwards, Pitohui releases a new song after being inspired by her loss and desire to defeat LLENN, while LLENN confides to Eva that she still wants to get stronger.
21	9	"An Invite to the Battlefield"; Transliteration: "Senjō e no Shōtai" (Japanese: 戦場への招待)	Ryōsuke Azuma	Kenichi Kawamura	November 30, 2024
After winning Squad Jam 3, LLEN considers quitting GGO, but Fukaziroh correctly deduces that she doesn't want to deal with Pitohui and SHINC's rivalries against her. They then receive a message from the GGO administrators inviting the top ranking teams from Squad Jam to participate in a Test Play, where they will be pitted against experimental AI opponents and the team that defeats them will win prizes. In order to balance the game, all of the human players will be given three lives each, only being eliminated when they lose their last one. LLEN is convinced to participate for a chance at a proper confrontation with SHINC. LPFM reunites, and they are briefed the enemy team has stolen chemical warheads, with the objective being to either eliminate the enemy team or recover the warheads. LPFM are sent to the battlefield, where they advance towards a castle in the center of the zone. However, they are attacked by SHINC on the way, and they decide to fight SHINC head on.
22	10	"The Devil's Castle"; Transliteration: "Akuma no Shiro" (Japanese: 悪魔の城)	Kazuho Kunimoto	Kazuho Kunimoto	December 7, 2024
LPFM head to engage SHINC, but are interrupted when ZEMAL ambushes them. LPFM and SHINC decide to temporarily team up to eliminate ZEMAL so they can continue their face off. In order to deal with them, Pitohui and Tanya commit suicide, sacrificing one of their lives so they can respawn behind ZEMAL and ambush them, wiping out the whole team. With ZEMAL temporarily dealt with, LPFM and SHINC decide to continue their truce so they can each have a chance to face off against the NPC team. LLEN approaches the castle the NPCs are occupying, but loses her first life after being lured into a trap by them. After LLEN respawns, LPFM scout the castle with the drone and find out the NPCS consist of the riflemen Jacob, Roy, and Doc, anti-material sniper Rock, grenadier Cain, machine gunner Vodka, and sniper Hasan. Through the drone, LPFM observe MMTM and SHINC attempt to assault the castle, but they are all wiped out by the NPCs. They are then shocked to see ZEMAL attempting to surrender to the NPCs.
23	11	"Pitohui's Attack"; Transliteration: "Pitofūi no Totsugeki" (Japanese: ピトフーイの突撃)	Shigehisa Iida & Aya Mikami	Shigehisa Iida	December 14, 2024
Realizing that ZEMAL are merely pretending to surrender to get into the castle, Pitohui foils their plans by firing at the castle and provoking the NPCs, whose return fire scares ZEMAL away. Pitohui then decides that the NPCs are too powerful for any individual team to defeat, and accepts and alliance with T-S. She then has LLEN send messages to SHINC, MMTM, and ZEMAL to join the alliance as well. She then comes up with a plan with the bulk of the alliance charging the castle from one side to distract the NPCs while a smaller group led by LLEN infiltrate from the opposite end. Working together, the alliance manages to break through the defenses, with LLEN killing Cain and Tanya disabling Vodka's weapon, which causes him to forfeit. As the alliance breaks into the castle, LLEN heads to the center of the keep to look for the chemical warheads but is instead captured by the NPCs. She tries to goad the NPCs into killing her so she can respawn, but they are intelligent enough not to fall for her ploy. As a last resort, LLEN commits suicide by ramming herself into a wall at full speed.
24	12	"The Reason to Fight"; Transliteration: "Tatakau Riyū wa" (Japanese: 戦う理由は)	Masayuki Sakoi & Yūsuke Murata	Masayuki Sakoi	December 21, 2024
As LLEN waits to respawn, the rest of the allied team attempts to assault the castle but are quickly repelled when the NPCs start using an RPG-7 against them. With no time left to wait for their casualties to respawn, Pitohui takes out her trump card, a bazooka, which she uses to kill Hasan. David takes the opportunity to charge through the gate and he mutually kills Roy. Rock attempts to ambush the allies with his RPG-7, but is killed by Shirley and Clarence, who had been in hiding the entire time. LLEN takes advantage of the distraction to storm the opposite gate, where she manages to kill Doc but ends up in a duel with Jacob. During the standoff, a shaken Jacob asks LLEN why she fights, and after taking a moment to reflect when she started playing GGO in the first place, she replies because it's fun. LLEN then kills Jacob as he apparently suffers from a nervous breakdown, winning the Test Play for LPFM. Meanwhile, in the real world, it is revealed that NPCs were all being played by actual soldiers as part of a therapy experiment by the real Doc to instill "the fear of death" back into them, and they believed LLEN and the others were NPCs. After his experiences fighting against LLEN, Jacob decides to finally retire from his life as a soldier. Afterwards, LLEN and her friends return to their normal lives until the start of the next Squad Jam.

== Recap specials ==
No.	Title	Original release date
5.5	"Refrain"; Transliteration: "Rufuran" (Japanese: ルフラン)	May 13, 2018
A recap of the first five episodes
12.5	"GALA"	September 27, 2024
A recap of the first season

== Home media release ==
=== Japanese ===
==== Sword Art Online Alternative: Gun Gale Online ====
Aniplex (Japan, Region 2)
Volume	Episodes	Blu-ray and DVD release date
Volume 1	1–2	June 22, 2018
Volume 2	3-4	July 25, 2018
Volume 3	5-6	August 29, 2018
Volume 4	7-8	September 26, 2018
Volume 5	9-10	October 24, 2018
Volume 6	11-12	November 28, 2018

==== Sword Art Online Alternative: Gun Gale Online II ====
Aniplex (Japan, Region 2)
Volume	Episodes	Blu-ray and DVD release date
Volume 1	1–2	December 18, 2024
Volume 2	3-4	January 29, 2025
Volume 3	5-6	February 26, 2025
Volume 4	7-8	March 26, 2025
Volume 5	9-10	April 23, 2025
Volume 6	11-12	May 28, 2025
