= Curio =

Curio may refer to:

== Objects ==
- Bric-à-brac, lesser objets d'art for display
- Cabinet of curiosities, a room-sized collection or exhibit of curios or curiosities
- Collectables
- Curio cabinet, a cabinet constructed for the display of curios

== People ==
- Eberhard Curio (1932–2020), German ecologist
- Gottfried Curio (born 1960), German politician
- Curio maximus, a priesthood in ancient Rome that had oversight of the curiae
- Gaius Scribonius Curio (disambiguation), the name of several ancient Romans, especially a father and son who were active in the 1st century BC

== Places ==
- Curio, Switzerland, a municipality in the district of Lugano in the canton of Ticino in Switzerland
- Curio Bay, a coastal bay best known as the site of a petrified forest some 180 million years old

== Popular culture ==
- Curio (Twelfth Night), a character in the Shakespearean comedy Twelfth Night
- Curio (band), a Japanese rock band
- Curio (The Shak), a character on the television program The Shak

== Other uses ==
- Curio (brand), a collection in the Hilton portfolio
- Curio (plant), a genus of flowering plant in the family Asteraceae

== See also ==
- Curiosity (disambiguation)
- Curious (disambiguation)
- Curia (disambiguation)
- Curie (disambiguation)
