= Curiosity (disambiguation) =

Curiosity is a quality related to inquisitive thinking.

Curiosity may also refer to:

== Film and television ==
- Curiosity (1967 film), a Yugoslavian cartoon
- Curiosity (2024 film), a horror short film
- Curiosity (TV series), a Discovery Channel technology-oriented program
- Curiosity, a BBC antiques game show presented by Paul Martin
- Curiosity Stream, an American media company
- The Curiosity Show, an Australian educational children's television series

== Music ==
- Curiosity, a British band also known as Curiosity Killed the Cat
- Curiosity (EP), 2012, by Carly Rae Jepsen
- Curiosity (Wampire album), 2013
- Curiosity, a 1986 album by Regina
- "Curiosity" (song), by Carly Rae Jepsen, 2012
- "Curiosity", a song by the Jets from the album The Jets, 1985
- "Curiosity", a song by Loona from the EP [+ +], 2018
- "C.U.R.I.O.S.I.T.Y.", a song by One Ok Rock from the album DETOX, 2025

== Other uses ==
- Novelty item or curiosity, an object that excites or rewards attention
- "Curiosity" (poem), by Charles Sprague
- Curiosity (rover), a NASA Mars exploration vehicle
- Curiosity: What's Inside the Cube?, a 2012 online video game by Peter Molyneux
- Curiosity (website), an online education resource site

== See also ==
- Curious (disambiguation)
- Curio (disambiguation)
