= Curia (disambiguation) =

Curia in ancient Rome referred to one of the original groupings of the citizenry.

Curia may also refer to:

== Historical organisations ==
- Curia feudalis, in medieval times, a suzerain lord's court, council and court of justice, consisting of vassals
  - Curia regis, in England and France
  - Curia Regia, in Hungary and in the Pyrenean Peninsula
  - Curia ducis, in Italy
  - Magna Curia, in the kingdom of Sicily

== Law and politics ==
- CVRIA or Court of Justice of the European Union, the institution of the European Union that encompasses the whole judiciary
- Curia (elections), separate electoral colleges in the curial electoral system
- Curia of Hungary, also known as the Supreme Court of Hungary

== Christian organisations ==
- Curia (Catholic Church), an official body that governs a particular Church in Roman Catholicism
- Roman Curia, the group of administrative institutions of the Holy See
- Prima Curia, a church and spiritual organization based on ancient teachings of Jesus Christ

== Places ==
- Curia (land) or Courland, one of the historical and cultural regions in western Latvia
- Curia, Graubünden or Chur, a town in Switzerland

== Buildings ==
- Curia Hostilia, first meeting house of the Roman Senate
- Curia Cornelia, second meeting house of the Roman Senate
- Curia Julia, third meeting house of the Roman Senate
- Curia of Pompey, meeting house of the Roman Senate
- Curia Confoederationis Helveticae, the building housing the Swiss Federal Assembly and Federal Council

== Plants ==
- Justicia pectoralis, an herb also known as curia
- Ayapana triplinervis, a tropical plant also known as curia

== People ==
- Curia (wife of Quintus Lucretius) (c. 60–5 BC), ancient Roman woman who hid her husband
- Curia gens, an ancient Roman family
- Francesco Curia (1538–1610), Italian painter

== Other uses ==
- CURIA (Cork University and Royal Irish Academy), a project to create a corpus of Irish texts, now called CELT
- Curia TV, an American streaming service
