= Mobbing (animal behavior) =

Attack on a predator by prey species

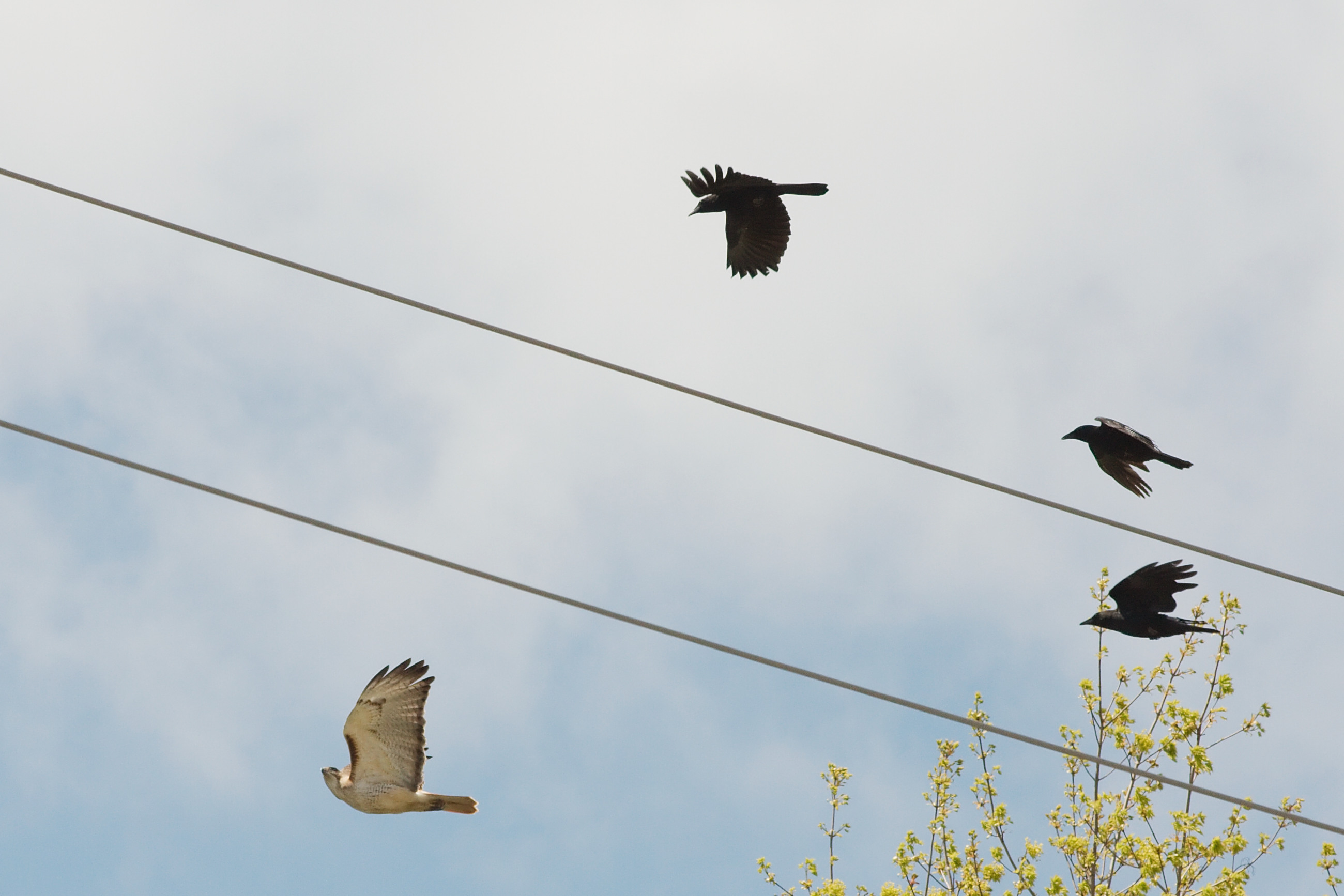
American crows (Corvus brachyrhynchos) mobbing a red-tailed hawk (Buteo jamaicensis)

Mobbing in animals is an anti-predator adaptation in which individuals of prey species cooperatively attack or harass a predator, usually to protect their offspring. A simple definition of mobbing is an assemblage of individuals around a potentially dangerous predator. This is most frequently seen in birds, though it is also known to occur in many other animals such as the meerkat and some bovines. While mobbing has evolved independently in many species, it only tends to be present in those whose young are frequently preyed upon. This behavior may complement cryptic adaptations in the offspring themselves, such as camouflage and hiding. Mobbing calls may be used to summon nearby individuals to cooperate in the attack.

Konrad Lorenz, in his book On Aggression (1966), attributed mobbing among birds and animals to instincts rooted in the Darwinian struggle to survive. In his view, humans are subject to similar innate impulses but capable of bringing them under rational control.

== In birds ==
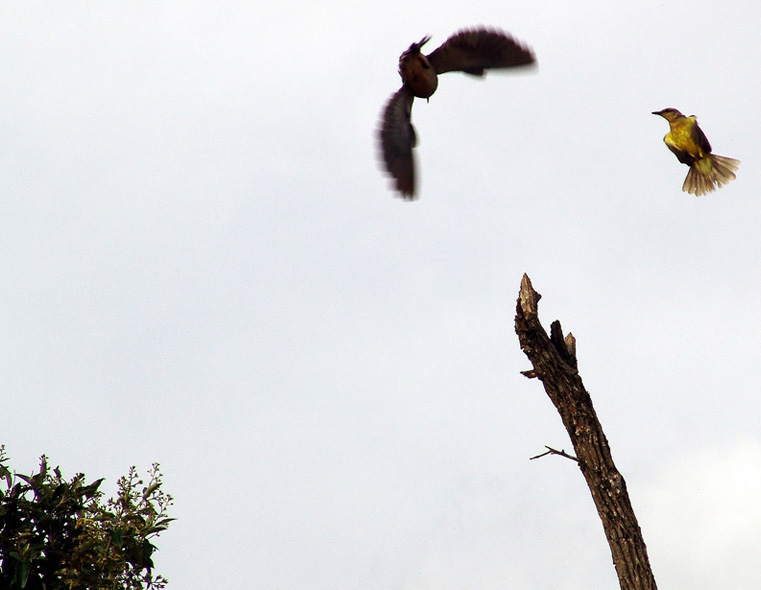
A cattle tyrant (Machetornis rixosa) (right) mobbing a hawk

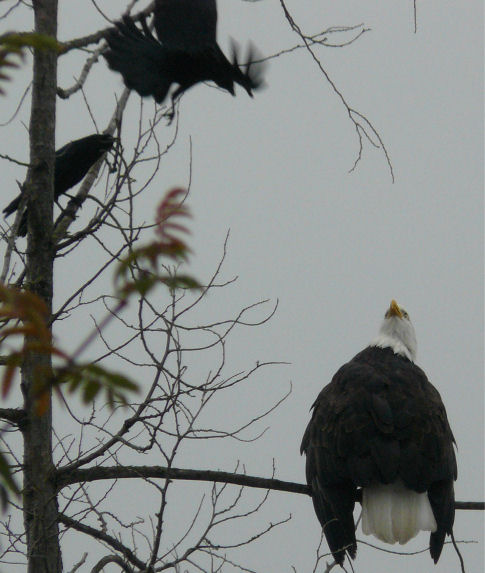
Crows mobbing a perched bald eagle (Haliaeetus leucocephalus)

Birds that breed in colonies such as gulls are widely seen to attack intruders, including encroaching humans. In North America, the birds that most frequently engage in mobbing include mockingbirds, crows and jays, chickadees, terns, and blackbirds. Behavior includes flying about the intruder, dive bombing, loud squawking and defecating on the predator. Mobbing can also be used to obtain food, by driving larger birds and mammals away from a food source, or by harassing a bird with food. One bird might distract while others quickly steal food. Scavenging birds such as gulls frequently use this technique to steal food from humans nearby. A flock of birds might drive a powerful animal away from food. Costs of mobbing behavior include the risk of engaging with predators, as well as energy expended in the process. The black-headed gull is a species which aggressively engages intruding predators, such as carrion crows. Classic experiments on this species by Hans Kruuk involved placing hen eggs at intervals from a nesting colony, and recording the percentage of successful predation events as well as the probability of the crow being subjected to mobbing. The results showed decreasing mobbing with increased distance from the nest, which was correlated with increased predation success. Mobbing may function by reducing the predator's ability to locate nests (as a distraction) since predators cannot focus on locating eggs while they are under attack.

Blue jay mobbing a barred owl

Besides the ability to drive the predator away, mobbing also draws attention to the predator, making stealth attacks impossible. Mobbing plays a critical role in the identification of predators and inter-generational learning about predator identification. Reintroduction of species is often unsuccessful, because the established population lacks this cultural knowledge of how to identify local predators. Scientists are exploring ways to train populations to identify and respond to predators before releasing them into the wild.

Adaptationist hypotheses regarding why an organism should engage in such risky behavior have been suggested by Eberhard Curio, including advertising their physical fitness and hence uncatchability (much like stotting behavior in gazelles), distracting predators from finding their offspring, warning their offspring, luring the predator away, allowing offspring to learn to recognize the predator species, directly injuring the predator or attracting a predator of the predator itself. The much lower frequency of attacks between nesting seasons suggests such behavior may have evolved due to its benefit for the mobber's young. Niko Tinbergen argued that the mobbing was a source of confusion to gull chick predators, distracting them from searching for prey. Indeed, an intruding carrion crow can only avoid incoming attacks by facing its attackers, which prevents it from locating its target.

Besides experimental research, the comparative method can also be employed to investigate hypotheses such as those given by Curio above. For example, not all gull species show mobbing behavior. The kittiwake nests on sheer cliffs that are almost completely inaccessible to predators, meaning its young are not at risk of predation like other gull species. This is an example of divergent evolution.

Another hypothesis for mobbing behavior is known as the “attract the mightier hypothesis.” Within this hypothesis, prey species produce a mobbing call in order to attract stronger secondary predator to address the threat of the present primary predator. A study conducted by Fang et al., showed significant findings for this unproved functional thesis, utilizing three different call types for the prey species light-vented bulbuls, Pycnonotus sinensis: the typical call (TC, the control treatment), a mobbing call to a collared scops owl (the MtO treatment) and a mobbing call to a crested goshawk, Accipiter trivirgatus (the superior predator; the MtH treatment).

Looking at variation in the behavioural responses of 22 different passerine species to a potential predator, the Eurasian Pygmy Owl, extent of mobbing was positively related with a species prevalence in the owls' diet. Furthermore, the intensity of mobbing was greater in autumn than spring.

Mobbing is thought to carry risks to roosting predators, including potential harm from the mobbing birds, or attracting larger, more dangerous predators. Birds at risk of mobbing such as owls have cryptic plumage and hidden roosts which reduces this danger.

== Effect of environment on mobbing behavior ==
Environment has an effect on mobbing behavior as seen in a study conducted by Dagan & Izhaki (2019), wherein mobbing behavior was examined particularly observing the effects of pine forest structure. Their findings showed that mobbing behavior varied by season, i.e., high responses in the winter, and moderate response in the fall. Additionally, the presence of a forest understory had a significant impact on mobbing behavior, i.e., the denser the understory vegetation, the more birds responded to mobbing calls. That is to say, the presence of cover in the forest highly contributes to willingness to respond to the aforementioned call.

== In other animals ==
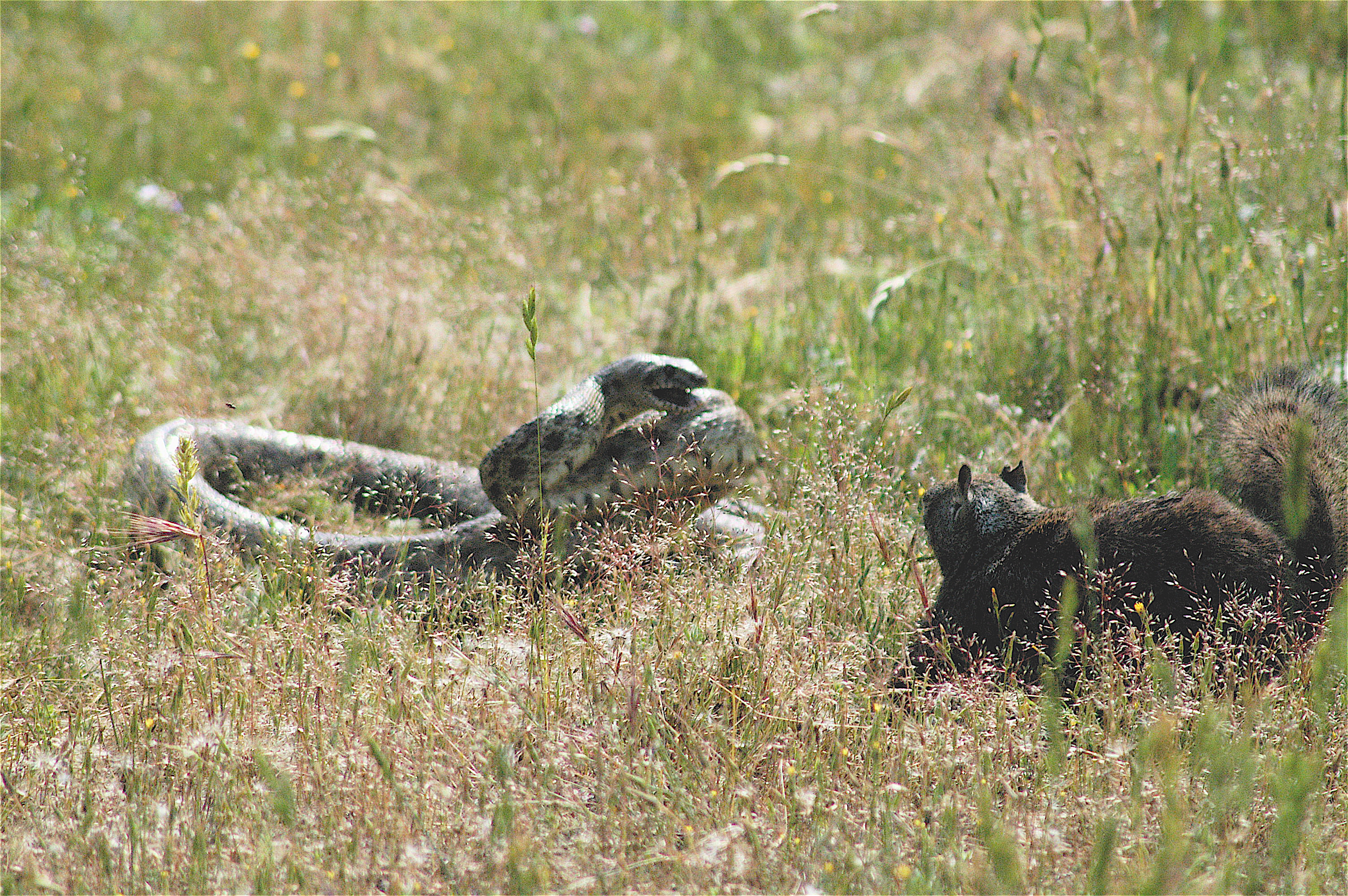
The occurrence of mobbing behavior across widely different taxa, including California ground squirrels, is evidence of convergent evolution.

Another way the comparative method can be used here is by comparing gulls with distantly related organisms. This approach relies on the existence of convergent evolution, where distantly related organisms evolve the same trait due to similar selection pressures. As mentioned, many bird species such as the swallows also mob predators, however more distantly related groups including mammals have been known to engage in this behavior. One example is the California ground squirrel, which distracts predators such as the rattlesnake and gopher snake from locating their nest burrows by kicking sand into the snake's face, thus disrupting its sensory organs; for crotaline snakes, this includes the heat-detecting organs in the loreal pits. This social species also uses alarm calls.

Some fish engage in mobbing; for example, bluegills sometimes attack snapping turtles. Bluegills, which form large nesting colonies, were seen to attack both released and naturally occurring turtles, which may advertise their presence, drive the predator from the area, or aid in the transmission of predator recognition. Similarly, humpback whales are known to mob killer whales when the latter are attacking other species, including other cetacean species, seals, sea lions, and fish.

There is a distinction though, between mobbing in animals, and fight-or-flight response. The former relies heavily on group dynamics, whereas the latter’s central focus conceptually is on that of the individual and its offspring in some cases. A study conducted by Adamo & McKee (2017) examining the cricket Gryllus texensis showcases this by activating high predation risk repeatedly to examine how animals in general perceive such risks. Based on perceived threat, crickets took action to save themselves or attempted to preserve their offspring.

== Mobbing calls ==
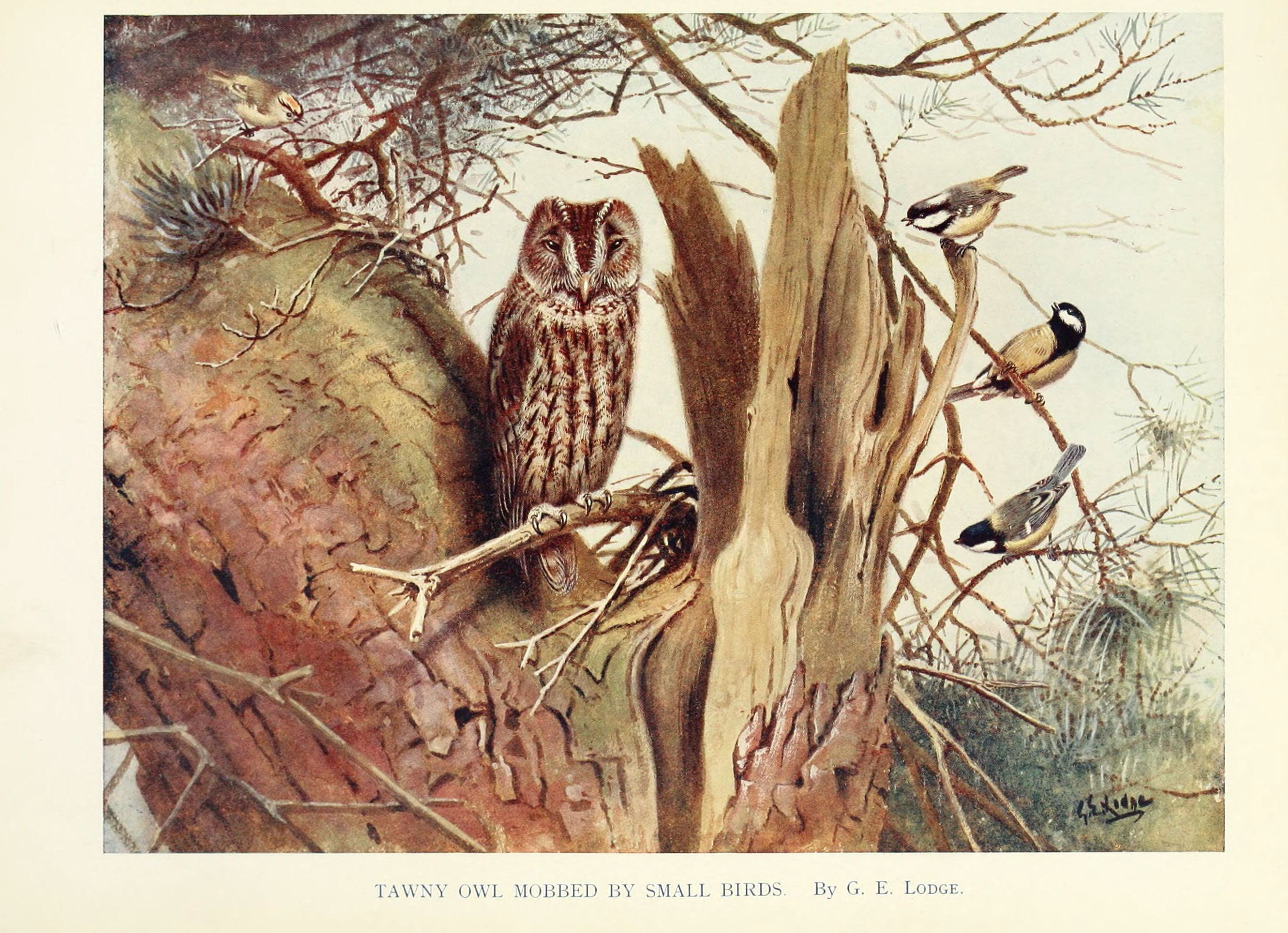
Tits (Paridae), a family of passerine bird, employ both mobbing behavior and alarm calls. In this illustration, a group of two great tits (Parus major) and a coal tit (Periparus ater, top right) are depicted mobbing a tawny owl (Strix aluco).

Mobbing calls are signals made by the mobbing species while harassing a predator. These differ from alarm calls, which allow con-specifics to escape from the predator. The great tit, a European songbird, uses such a signal to call on nearby birds to harass a perched bird of prey, such as an owl. This call occurs in the 4.5kHz range, and carries over long distances. However, when prey species are in flight, they employ an alarm signal in the 7–8 kHz range. This call is less effective at traveling great distances, but is much more difficult for both owls and hawks to hear (and detect the direction from which the call came). In the case of the alarm call, it could be disadvantageous to the sender if the predator picks up on the signal, hence selection has favored those birds able to hear and employ calls in this higher frequency range.

Furthermore, bird vocalizations vary acoustically as a byproduct of adapting to the environment, according to the acoustic adaptation hypothesis. In a study by Billings (2018) examining, specifically the low-frequency acoustic structure of mobbing calls across habitat types (closed, open, and urban) in three passerine families (Corvidae, Icteridae, Turdidae), it was discovered that the size of the bird was a factor in the variation of mobbing calls. Additionally, species in closed and urban habitats had lower energy and lower low frequencies in their mobbing calls, respectively.

Mobbing calls may also be part of an animal's arsenal in harassing the predator. Studies of Phainopepla mobbing calls indicate it may serve to enhance the swooping attack on the predators, including scrub jays. In this species, the mobbing call is smoothly upsweeping, and is made when swooping down in an arc beside the predator. This call was also heard during agonistic behavior interactions with conspecifics, and may serve additionally or alternatively as an alarm call to their mate.

== Evolution ==
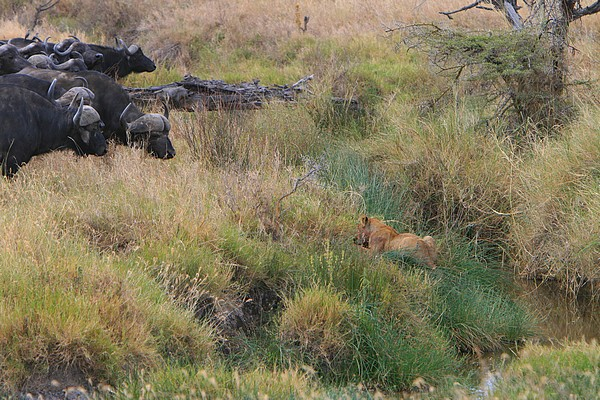
African buffalo herd confronting a lion

The evolution of mobbing behavior can be explained using evolutionarily stable strategies, which are in turn based on game theory.

Mobbing involves risks (costs) to the individual and benefits (payoffs) to the individual and others. The individuals themselves are often genetically related, and mobbing is increasingly studied with the gene-centered view of evolution by considering inclusive fitness (the carrying on of one's genes through one's family members), rather than merely benefit to the individual.

Mobbing behavior varies in intensity depending on the perceived threat of a predator according to a study done by Dutour et al. (2016). However, particularly in terms of its surfacing in avian species, it is accepted to be the byproduct of mutualism, rather than reciprocal altruism according to Russell & Wright (2009).

By cooperating to successfully drive away predators, all individuals involved increase their chances of survival and reproduction. An individual stands little chance against a larger predator, but when a large group is involved, the risk to each group member is reduced or diluted. This so-called dilution effect proposed by W. D. Hamilton is another way of explaining the benefits of cooperation by selfish individuals. Lanchester's laws also provide an insight into the advantages of attacking in a large group rather than individually.

Another interpretation involves the use of signalling theory, and possibly the handicap principle. Here the idea is that a mobbing bird, by apparently putting itself at risk, displays its status and health so as to be preferred by potential partners.
