= Discovery, Inc. =

Former American factual media company (1982–2022)

- Final logo, used from 2018 to 2022
- Formerly: Cable Educational Network Inc. (1982–1994); Discovery Communications, Inc. (1994–2018)
- Type: Public
- Traded as: Nasdaq: DISCA (Series A); Nasdaq: DISCB (Series B); Nasdaq: DISCK (Series C)
- Industry: Mass media
- Predecessors: Discovery Holding Company; Scripps Networks Interactive
- Founded: 1982; 44 years ago (Cable Educational Network); 1994; 32 years ago (Discovery Communications); March 6, 2018; 8 years ago (Discovery, Inc.)
- Founder: John Hendricks
- Defunct: April 8, 2022; 4 years ago
- Fate: Merged with WarnerMedia
- Successor: Warner Bros. Discovery
- Headquarters: 230 Park Avenue South, New York City, United States
- Area served: Worldwide
- Key people: Robert Miron (chairman); Gunnar Widenfeds Chief financial officer (CFO); John C. Malone (board member); David Zaslav (president and CEO)
- Products: Factual television
- Revenue: ▼US$10.671 billion (2020)
- Operating income: ▲US$2.515 billion (2020)
- Net income: ▼US$1.355 billion (2020)
- Total assets: ▲US$34.087 billion (2020)
- Total equity: ▲US$12.000 billion (2020)
- Number of employees: 9,800 (2020)
- Divisions: Discovery Networks U.S.; Discovery Networks International; Discovery Education; Discovery Studios; Discovery Global Enterprises; Discovery Golf
- Subsidiaries: Eurosport; All3Media (50% with Liberty Global); Motor Trend Group (JV with Source Interlink); Play Sports Group
- Website: corporate.discovery.com (archived November 26, 2018)
- Footnotes; Financials as of December 31, 2019.

Discovery, Inc. was an American multinational mass media and factual television conglomerate based in New York City that was in operation from 1982 to April 8, 2022. It operated factual and lifestyle television brands like the namesake Discovery Channel, Animal Planet, Science Channel and TLC. In 2018, the company acquired Scripps Networks Interactive, adding networks such as Food Network, HGTV and Travel Channel to its portfolio. Since the purchase, Discovery described itself as serving members of "passionate" audiences, and also placed a focus on streaming services built around its properties.

Discovery owned or had interests in local versions of its channel brands in international markets, in addition to its other major regional operations such as Eurosport (a pan-European sports channel brand, most prominently the rightsholder of the Olympic Games throughout most of Europe), GolfTV (an international golf-focused streaming service, which is the international digital rightsholder of the PGA Tour), Discovery Communications Nordic (which operates general-interest channels in Norway, Sweden, Denmark and Finland), TVN Group in Poland, and a portfolio of various free-to-air channels in Germany, Italy, New Zealand and the United Kingdom.

0n May 18, 2021, AT&T announced its proposal to merge its acquired media subsidiary WarnerMedia with Discovery, Inc. The transaction was approved by the European Commission (EC) in December 2021 and was completed on April 8, 2022, forming Warner Bros. Discovery (WBD).

== History ==
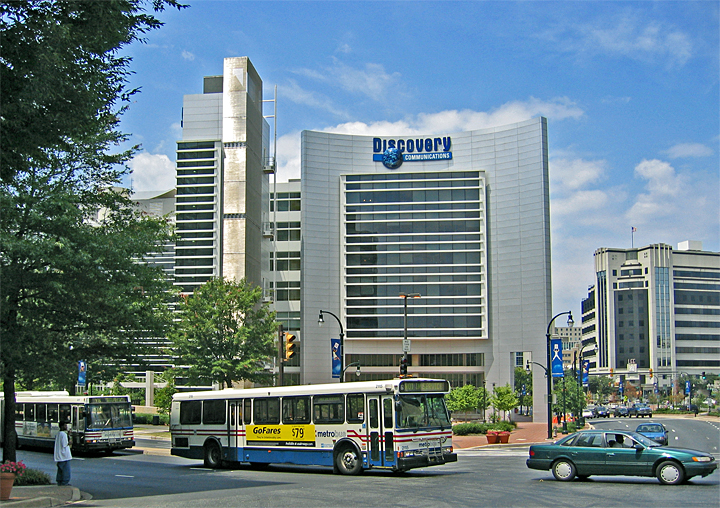
Former headquarters of Discovery, Inc. in Silver Spring, Maryland

The company was established in 1982 in Landover, Maryland, as the Cable Educational Network. Its namesake and flagship brand, Discovery Channel, first launched on June 17, 1985. In 1991, Discovery Channel's owners acquired The Learning Channel. Three years later, Cable Educational Network was renamed Discovery Communications.

In October 1996, Discovery launched several new spin-off networks, including Animal Planet, and the digital cable channels Discovery Kids, Discovery Travel & Living, Discovery Civilization, and Science Channel. This was followed by the 1997 purchase of a 70% stake in Travel Channel, and the 1998 launches of Discovery en Español, Discovery Wings, and Discovery Health Channel. Also in 1998, Discovery acquired a stake in the struggling CBS Eye on People channel; Discovery eventually acquired the remainder of CBS's stake, leading to its January 1999 relaunch as Discovery People. The network quietly folded in 2000, being replaced by other Discovery channels on providers.

On September 1, 2001, Discovery Communications bought The Health Channel, and announced that it would be re-branded as FitTV. In 2002, Discovery relaunched Discovery Civilization as Discovery Times, as part of a joint venture with The New York Times. In June 2002, coinciding with Discovery's 17th anniversary, the company launched a 24/7 high definition channel known as Discovery HD Theater. In 2003, Discovery Communications moved its headquarters from Bethesda to Silver Spring. In 2003 and 2004, Discovery acquired academic film companies such as AGC, AIMS Multimedia, and Clearvue & SVE to form Discovery Education, which is now led by Jeremy Cowdrey, former CEO of Imagine Learning. In 2019, Discovery Communications moved its headquarters to New York City, keeping 300 employees in a smaller hub in Silver Spring.

=== Zaslav era ===
Former NBCUniversal executive David Zaslav was named president and CEO of Discovery Communications on November 16, 2006. In the years that followed, Zaslav placed a major focus on bolstering Discovery's core networks, programming, and expanding the company's reach into digital media. He described these goals as reflecting an expansion into becoming a "content company" rather than just a "cable company".

In March 2007, Discovery sold its stake in Travel Channel back to Cox Communications, in exchange for the stake in Discovery that Cox owned. Cox would later sell the controlling interest in the channel to Scripps Networks Interactive in 2009. In June 2008, Discovery Home was replaced by Planet Green, a network devoted primarily to environmentalism and sustainable living.

In 2007, according to Crunchbase, TreeHugger was acquired by Discovery Communications on August 1, 2007, for $10 million. In 2012, Mother Nature Network, founded by Joel Babbit and Chuck Leavell (now Narrative Content Group) acquired TreeHugger.

On January 15, 2008, Discovery announced that it had entered into a joint venture with Oprah Winfrey's Harpo Productions to relaunch Discovery Health as a new service, OWN: The Oprah Winfrey Network, in 2009. In 2008, Discovery Times was relaunched as Investigation Discovery, a new brand that would be dedicated to true crime programs and documentaries. The company also formed its Emerging Networks Group, and named Clark Bunting as president and Clint Stinchcomb as executive vice president and general manager. On April 30, 2009, Discovery announced a joint venture with Hasbro to relaunch Discovery Kids as a new youth- and family-oriented entertainment channel. The channel, ultimately named The Hub, launched on October 10, 2010. After multiple delays, OWN officially launched on January 1, 2011.

On March 17, 2009, Discovery Communications sued Amazon for patent infringement by its Kindle e-reader line, regarding "secure distribution of electronic text and graphics to subscribers and secure storage". The patents were originally developed by Discovery founder John Hendricks, who had been developing technologies related to e-books and the digitization of television programs. While Discovery had divested the television-related patents, it retained the e-book patents. Amazon subsequently accused Discovery of violating a patent for an "Internet-based customer referral system". The two parties settled in 2011.

On October 4, 2011, due to the wider implementation of high-definition feeds for mainstream cable channels, HD Theater was relaunched as Velocity, a new "upscale male" network focusing on automotive programming. On May 26, 2012, Planet Green (which had begun to abandon its original concept in 2010 due to poor viewership) was relaunched as Destination America.

In January 2014, Discovery launched Curiosity, a website that aggregates online education content.

In April 2014, Discovery made an investment and strategic partnership with Dog TV, a television network made specifically for dogs.

In May 2014, Discovery and its shareholder Liberty Media acquired British television studio All3Media for $930 million in a 50/50 joint venture. The new ownership stated that All3Media would be operated as an independent company. In October 2014, Discovery acquired controlling interest in Hub Network from Hasbro and re-branded it as Discovery Family. During the same month of that year, Discovery Communications announced a special dividend of shares of the company's Series C common stock payable to holders of record of the company's Series A common stock, Series B common stock and Series C common stock as of the close of business on July 28, 2014. As a result of the dividend, each holder of a share of the company's Series A common stock, Series B common stock or Series C common stock will receive one additional share of the company's Series C common stock on or about August 6, 2014. In November 2014, Curiosity was spun out as a venture-funded startup, receiving $6 million in funding.

In November 2015, Discovery Communications and Liberty Global paid approximately $195 million for a 3.4% stake in Lionsgate Entertainment with Discovery CEO David Zaslav joining the Lionsgate board of directors as part of the acquisition. In December 2015, Discovery launched Discovery Go, a TV Everywhere service offering access to live streaming and on-demand content from Discovery Communications' cable networks.

In May 2016, Discovery initiated a restructuring plan aiming to save $40 to $60 million by the third quarter of 2016, including a shift in strategy to "maximize" its linear television business whilst plotting larger investments in content, digital media, sports, and international markets. In August 2016, Discovery purchased a minority stake in the Hong Kong-based digital talent and content company VS Media; Discovery intended to have VS distribute Discovery Digital Networks content in China, and to offer their own resources to VS.

In October 2016, Discovery purchased a minority stake in Group Nine Media, a digital media holding company consisting of Thrillist Media Group, NowThis, The Dodo and Discovery's digital network Seeker—for $100 million. The transaction gave Discovery an option to acquire a majority stake at a later date.

=== Acquisition of Scripps Networks Interactive ===
On July 31, 2017, Discovery announced it would acquire Scripps Networks Interactive, owner of networks such as Food Network, HGTV, and DIY Network, for $14.6 billion, pending regulatory approval. On March 6, 2018, the acquisition was completed, with the company renamed as Discovery, Inc. afterwards. Following the purchase, SNI shareholders owned 20% of Discovery's stock. Discovery retained an operational hub in SNI's home city of Knoxville, but planned to move its corporate headquarters from Silver Spring, Maryland, where it had operated since 2003, to New York City in 2019.

Discovery's brands were reorganized into two groups under different chief brand officers: SNI's chief programmer Kathleen Finch became chief brand officer of Lifestyle, overseeing TLC, the six former Scripps channels, and Discovery's other lifestyle networks. Rich Ross, who formerly served as group president of Discovery and Science, stepped down, and would be replaced by TLC president Nancy Daniels as chief brand officer of Discovery & Factual.

An on-air result of the acquisition were multiple programs featuring crossovers between TLC and Scripps talent, such as the Food Network series Buddy vs. Duff (a cake design competition series starring Buddy Valastro and Duff Goldman of the TLC and Food Network programs Cake Boss and Ace of Cakes), and a revival of TLC's While You Were Out incorporating HGTV personalities.

On August 3, 2017, Discovery announced that it would contribute Velocity into a joint venture with the digital, live events, and direct-to-consumer businesses of automotive publisher TEN: The Enthusiast Network. Discovery will hold a majority stake in the venture; it will not include TEN's print brands, but there will be opportunities for cross-promotion. In April 2018, it was announced that TEN had been renamed Motor Trend Group, and that Velocity would be re-branded as an extension of its namesake magazine Motor Trend.

In December 2017, Discovery announced that it would acquire an additional 24.5% stake in OWN that it did not already own, for $70 million. Oprah Winfrey will remain as CEO of OWN, and extended her exclusivity agreement with the network and Discovery through 2025. Harpo Productions retains a "significant minority stake" in the venture. In February 2018, Discovery sold a majority stake in Discovery Education to the private equity firm Francisco Partners.

=== Focus on direct-to-consumer services ===
During its 2018 upfronts, Zaslav stated that the company was now strongly focused on serving "passionate fans and passionate audiences", and was preparing to increase its focus on direct-to-consumer offerings targeting such audiences. The SNI purchase, Eurosport's Olympics rights, and the aforementioned Motor Trend-branded network were described as being examples of this strategy. Food Network Kitchen would also launch in 2019, with a focus on live and on-demand cooking classes.

In June 2018, Discovery announced a 12-year agreement to acquire the international media rights to the PGA Tour, with plans to develop an international streaming service to house these rights. The service was officially announced in October 2018 as GolfTV, with Eurosport executive vice president Alex Kaplan named the president and general manager of Discovery Golf. Former Amazon executive Peter Faricy, who was named Discovery's chief executive of global direct-to-consumer operations in August 2018, considered GolfTV consistent with the aforementioned strategy, as golf was one of several sports "where people's passions and their interest in participating and learning more becomes a core part of their life."

With Discovery choosing 230 Park Avenue South as its new New York City headquarters, Discovery sold its former Silver Spring headquarters to Foulger-Pratt and Cerberus Capital Management in September 2018 and leased a smaller space at nearby 8403 Colesville Road.

In November 2018, Chip and Joanna Gaines of the former HGTV series Fixer Upper announced on The Tonight Show Starring Jimmy Fallon that they were in early talks to form a "lifestyle focused media network" with Discovery named after their personal company Magnolia. It was reported that Discovery had considered rebranding either DIY Network or Great American Country as this new channel. In April 2019, Discovery confirmed its Magnolia joint venture, which was scheduled to launch in 2020 and replace DIY Network, with an over-the-top subscription component to launch later. Magnolia Network's launch was postponed until 2021 due to the COVID-19 pandemic in the United States. It was also announced that Fixer Upper would be revived for the new channel.

In January 2019, Discovery increased its ownership of Play Sports Group, operator of the YouTube channel Global Cycling Network, to 71%. Discovery previously acquired a 20% share in 2017. The group is the foundation for an in development global cycling OTT service.

On April 1, 2019, after a previous agreement with the broadcaster lapsed six years prior, Discovery announced a 10-year global content partnership with BBC Studios, under which it will become the exclusive subscription video-on-demand rightsholder of programming from the BBC Natural History Unit (which will become the basis of an international subscription service by 2020) outside of China, Ireland, and the UK. In addition, Discovery and the BBC reached an agreement to break up their UKTV joint venture (which was inherited from Scripps), with Discovery acquiring the BBC's shares in the Good Food, Home, and Really channels, and BBC Studios acquiring Discovery's shares in the seven remaining channels, and its streaming platform UKTV Play. Home was later rebranded as a local version of HGTV, and Good Food was closed in favor of the local version of Food Network.

On May 13, 2019, Discovery announced that it would acquire Golf Digest from Condé Nast to integrate into its Discovery Golf division.

In March 2020, Discovery began to deploy a new direct-to-consumer brand known as Discovery+, initially in India, which would focus on content from across its factual and lifestyle television brands, as well as the BBC. In December 2020, Discovery announced that it would launch Discovery+ in the United States on January 4, 2021, which would feature new exclusive programming from across Discovery's brands, and previews of Magnolia Network (whose linear launch had since been delayed to 2022).

In May 2021, Discovery formed a multi-platform content partnership with the Georgia Aquarium.

=== Merger with WarnerMedia ===
On May 17, 2021, AT&T announced that it had reached an agreement to merge its content and broadcasting subsidiary, WarnerMedia (the former Time Warner, which AT&T had acquired in 2018 for just over $85 billion in an attempt to become a vertically integrated media conglomerate) with Discovery Inc. to form a new company, subject to regulatory approval. The merger, scheduled to be completed in mid-2022, would be structured as a Reverse Morris Trust; AT&T shareholders will hold a 71% interest in the new company's stock and appoint seven board members, and Discovery shareholders will hold 29% and appoint six board members. AT&T will receive $43 billion in cash and debt from the spin-off.

Zaslav will lead the new company. He stated that the new company's goal would be to "[tell] the most amazing stories and have a ton of fun doing it", and emphasized that the two companies spend over $20 billion annually on content (outpacing Disney, Netflix and even Amazon). The company will aim to expand their streaming services (which includes WarnerMedia's HBO Max) to reach 400 million global subscribers.

On June 1, 2021, it was announced that the merged company would be known as Warner Bros. Discovery, and an interim wordmark was unveiled with the tagline "The stuff dreams are made from"—a line from the 1941 Warner Bros. film The Maltese Falcon. Zaslav stated that the name would reflect "the combination of Warner Bros.' fabled hundred-year legacy of creative, authentic storytelling and taking bold risks to bring the most amazing stories to life, with Discovery's global brand that has always stood brightly for integrity, innovation and inspiration". On June 7, 2021, Discovery announced that it would divest Great American Country to GAC Media, a new Fort Worth-based investment group led by Tom Hicks and former Crown Media Holdings CEO Bill Abbott.

Electronic Arts, who were a bidder in the proposed sale of Warner Bros. Interactive Entertainment, purchased the mobile gaming studio Playdemic from WBIE for US$1.4 billion in the same month.

In September 2021, Fox Corporation acquired TMZ from WarnerMedia in a deal worth about $50 million with TMZ being operated under the Fox Entertainment division.

In November 2021, Discovery and WarnerMedia discussed a plan to combine the two streaming services, HBO Max and Discovery+, into one streaming service in two phases: an initial phase that allows for quick bundling of the services and a second phase that allows for a common service on one tech platform. In the same month, it was announced that Discovery will rename itself Warner Bros. Discovery and reclassify and convert its stock into stock of WBD.

On December 22, 2021, it was announced that the transaction was approved by the European Commission and it is expected to be completed in mid-2022, subject to approval by Discovery shareholders and additional closing conditions.

On January 5, 2022, The Wall Street Journal reported that WarnerMedia and ViacomCBS were exploring a possible sale of either a majority stake or all of The CW, and that Nexstar Media Group (which became The CW's largest affiliate group when it acquired former WB co-owner Tribune Broadcasting in 2019) was considered a leading bidder. The news led to speculation that, should a sale take place, new ownership could steer the network in a new direction, transforming The CW from a young adult-oriented network into one that featured more unscripted and even national news programming. However, reports also indicated that WarnerMedia and ViacomCBS could include a contractual commitment that would require any new owner to buy new programming from those companies, allowing them to reap some continual revenue through the network. Network president/CEO Mark Pedowitz confirmed talks of a potential sale in a memo to CW staffers, but added that "It's too early to speculate what might happen" and that the network "must continue to do what we do best."

On January 26, 2022, it was reported that the merger between WarnerMedia and Discovery, Inc. was expected to close sometime during the second quarter of 2022. This was later narrowed down to mid-April 2022. On February 1, 2022, it was reported that AT&T had elected to structure the merger as a spin-off of WarnerMedia, followed by a merger with Discovery Inc. to form the new company. The company had been contemplating structuring the transaction as a split-off (under which AT&T shareholders would be given the option as to whether to exchange their shares for those of the new company, rather than receive them pro rata). On February 7, the merger was approved by the Brazilian antitrust regulator Cade. It was approved by the United States Department of Justice two days later.

The transaction was approved by Discovery shareholders on March 11, and formally completed on April 8, 2022.

== 2010 hostage crisis ==
On September 1, 2010, the Discovery headquarters were the site of a hostage taking; a lone gunman identified as James Jay Lee, armed with two starter pistols and an explosive device, took three people hostage inside of the Discovery Communications headquarters in Silver Spring, Maryland, prompting an evacuation of the building. Lee's motive was believed to have been grounded in environmental activism. Lee had previously been arrested in 2008 while protesting in front of the same site.

The National Consortium for the Study of Terrorism and Responses to Terrorism (START) at the University of Maryland has since labeled the crime a terrorist attack.

The incident began at 1:00 p.m. ET, when the 43-year-old Lee entered the building with two starter pistols and fired a single round at the ceiling of the lobby. The Montgomery County Police Department (MCPD) confirmed that Lee had an explosive device and was holding three people hostage in the lobby. The building was placed on lockdown and most of the 1,500 employees were evacuated. Children from a day care center inside were safely removed to a nearby McDonald's restaurant on Colesville Rd. Lee was shot and killed by an MCPD SWAT team at 4:48 p.m. ET after the hostages made a run to escape (who was unable to shoot to kill an MCPD SWAT team with two starter pistols and also did not detonate an explosive device in the building). The remaining hostages were immediately freed. The incident was described by the FBI as the first instance of a would-be suicide bomber taking hostages in the United States.

Lee was an environmental protester who, in 2008, was given six months of supervised probation and fined $500 after he was arrested during a protest outside the Discovery Communications headquarters. Lee had published criticisms of the network in an online manifesto at Savetheplanetprotest.com, among which was a demand for the company to cease the broadcasting of television series displaying or encouraging the birth of "parasitic human infants and the false heroics behind those actions". His manifesto also railed against "immigration pollution and anchor baby filth", leading commentators such as Mark Potok of the Southern Poverty Law Center to decry Lee as an "eco-fascist". Lee's opinions were dominated by Malthusian analysis, though he also cited works ranging from Daniel Quinn's novel My Ishmael to former U.S. Vice President Al Gore's documentary An Inconvenient Truth. The Washington Post credited the Twitter community for initially breaking the story.

== See also ==
- A+E Global Media
- National Geographic Partners
- Smithsonian Affiliations
