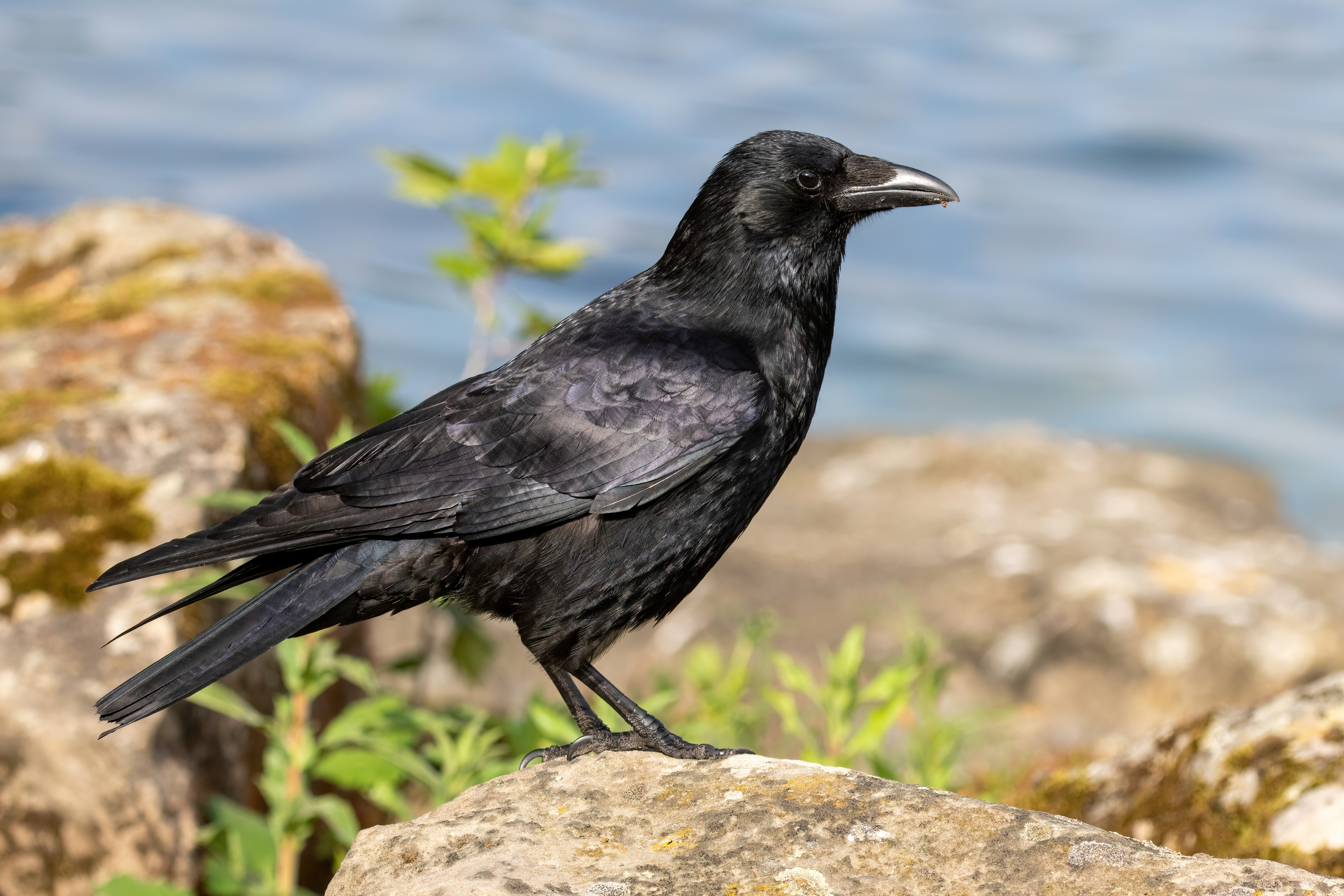
- In Gennevilliers, France

Conservation status
- Least Concern (IUCN 3.1)

Scientific classification
- Kingdom: Animalia
- Phylum: Chordata
- Class: Aves
- Order: Passeriformes
- Family: Corvidae
- Genus: Corvus
- Species: C. corone

Binomial name
- Corvus corone Linnaeus, 1758

Subspecies
- Corvus corone corone; Corvus corone orientalis
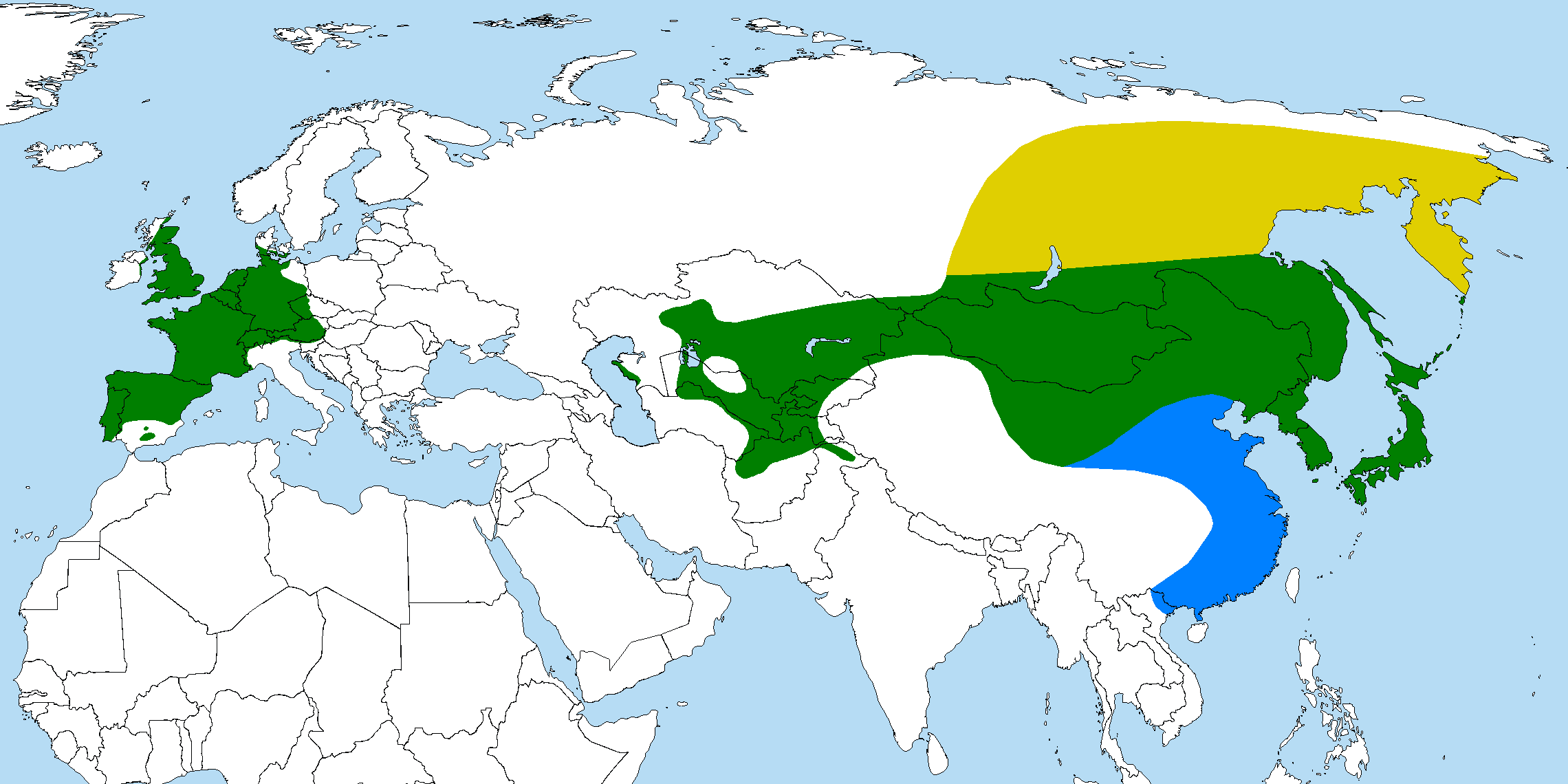
- Carrion crow range Breeding summer visitor Breeding resident Non-breeding winter visitor Left (Europe): Corvus corone corone Right (Asia): Corvus corone orientalis

Audio
- Calls recorded in Devon, England

= Carrion crow =

Carrion crow Temporal range: Late Pleistocene–Recent

Species of bird

The carrion crow (Corvus corone) is a passerine bird of the family Corvidae, native to western Europe and the eastern Palearctic. Along with the hooded crow (Corvus cornix), the carrion crow occupies a similar ecological niche in Eurasia to the American crow (Corvus brachyrhynchos) in North America. The two species look very similar to one another, but can be differentiated by size, as the carrion crow is larger and of a stockier build compared to the American crow.

== Taxonomy and systematics ==
The carrion crow was one of the many species originally described by Carl Linnaeus in his landmark 1758 10th edition of Systema Naturae, and it still bears its original name of Corvus corone. The binomial name is derived from the Latin corvus, "raven", and Greek κορώνη korōnē, "crow".

The hooded crow (Corvus cornix), formerly regarded as a subspecies, has been split off as a separate species, and some discussion has arisen as to whether the eastern carrion crow (C. c. orientalis) is distinct enough to warrant a separate specific status; the two taxa are well separated, as they could have evolved independently in the wetter, maritime regions at the opposite ends of the Eurasian landmass.

== Description ==
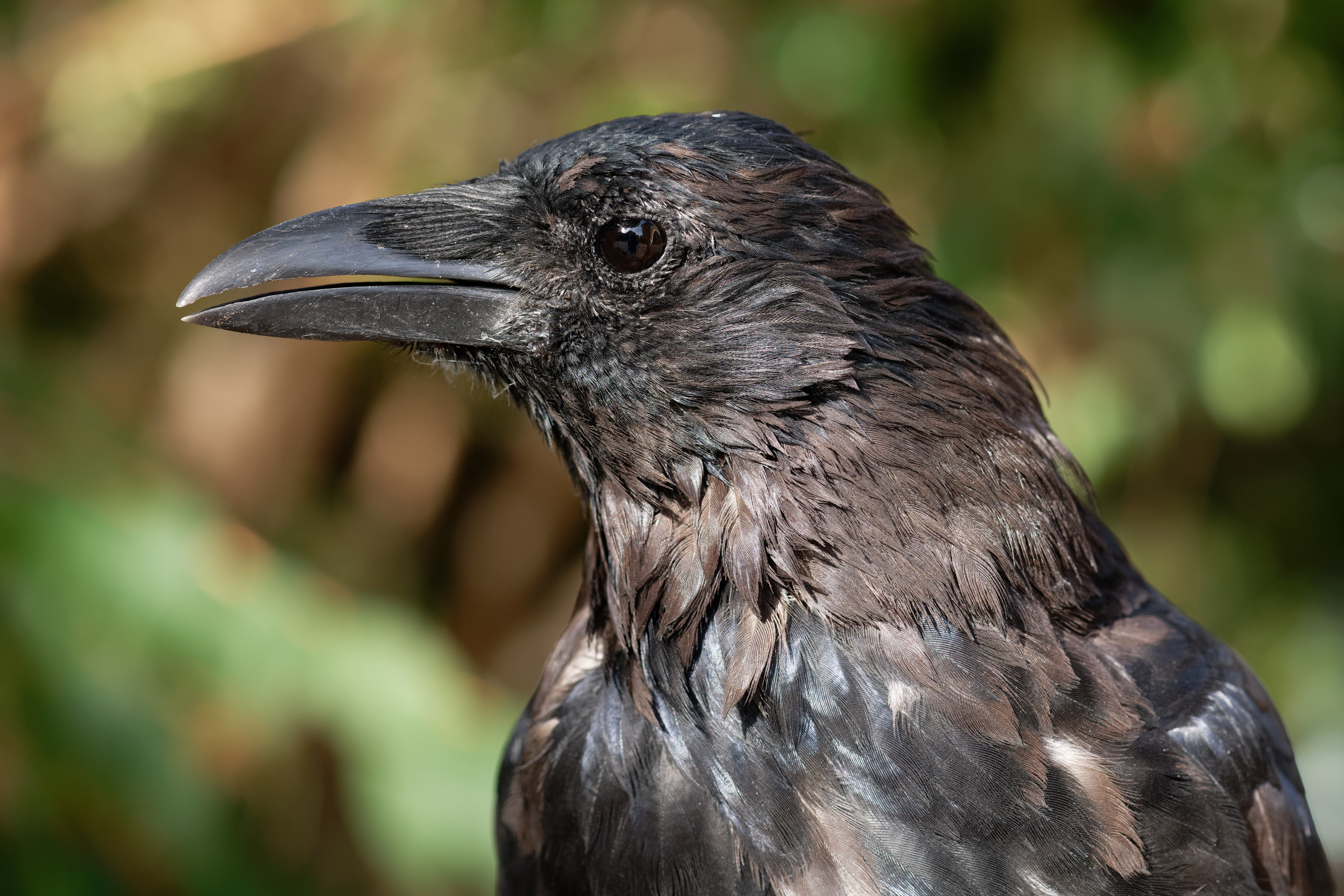
Adult male carrion crow moulting at the Jardin des Plantes of Paris

The plumage of the carrion crow is black with a green or purple sheen, much greener than the gloss of the rook (Corvus frugilegus). The bill, legs, and feet are also black. It can be distinguished from the common raven by its size, around 48–52 cm (19–20 in) in length, as compared to an average of 63 cm (25 in) for ravens, and from the hooded crow by its black plumage. The carrion crow has a wingspan of 84–100 cm (33–39 in) and weighs 400–600 g (14–21 oz).

Juvenile carrion crows can be identified by their brownish plumage and blue eyes, both of which darken to black and brown as the crow grows older.

== Distribution and genetic relationship to hooded crows ==
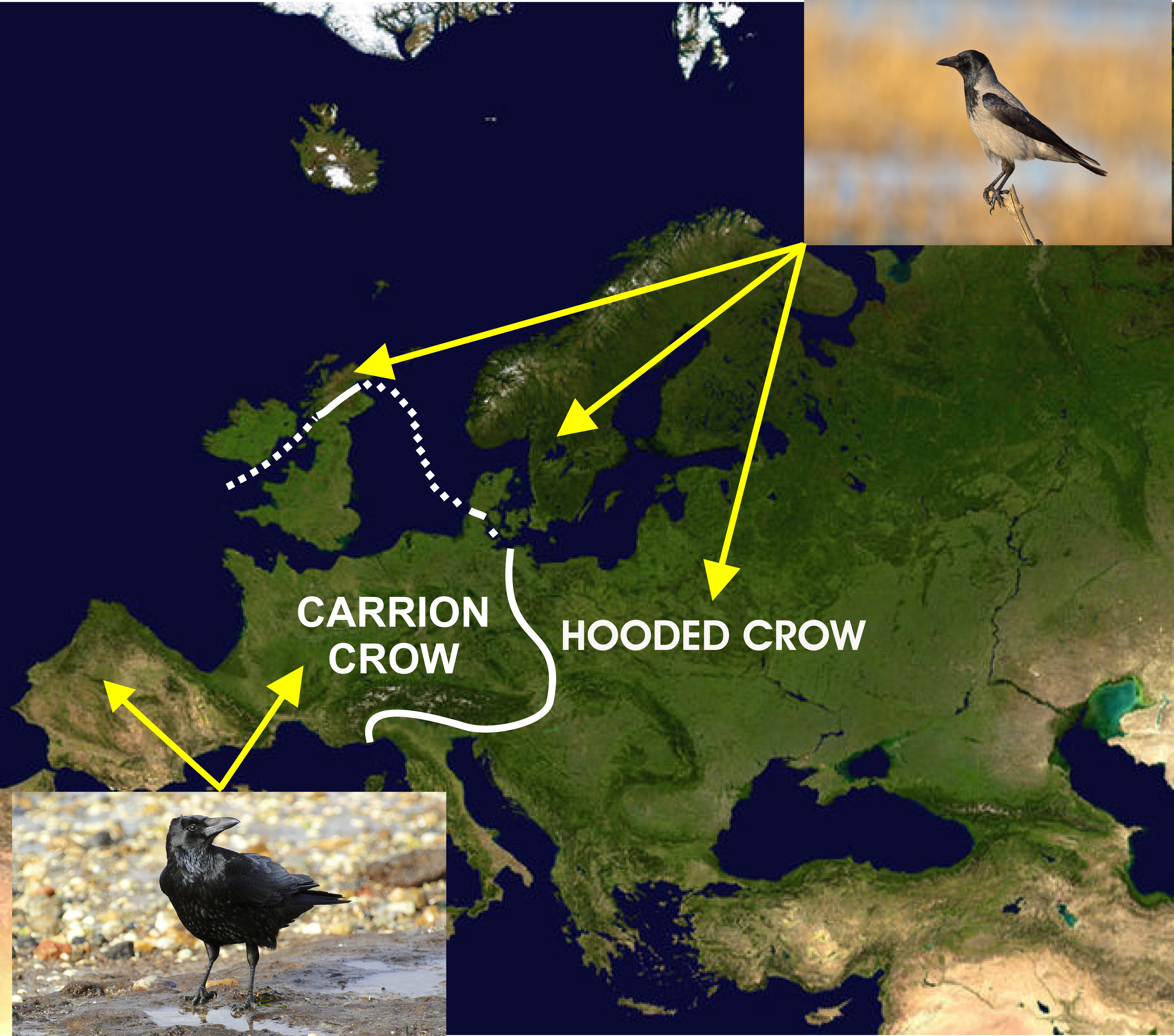
A map of Europe indicating the distribution of the carrion and hooded crows on either side of a contact zone (white line) separating the two species

The carrion crow (C. corone) and hooded crow (C. cornix), including the former's slightly larger allied subspecies C. c. orientalis, are two very closely related species; the geographic distributions of both forms of carrion crow across Europe are illustrated in the accompanying diagram. This distribution might have resulted from the glaciation cycles during the Pleistocene, which caused the parent population to split into isolates, which subsequently re-expanded their ranges when the climate warmed, causing secondary contact.

Poelstra and coworkers sequenced almost the entire genomes of both species in populations at varying distances from the contact zone to find that the two species were genetically identical, both in their DNA and in its expression (in the form of mRNA), except for the lack of expression of a small portion (<0.28%) of the genome (situated on avian chromosome 18) in the hooded crow, which imparts the lighter plumage colouration on its torso. Thus, the two species can viably hybridize, and occasionally do so at the contact zone, but the all-black carrion crows on the one side of the contact zone mate almost exclusively with other all-black carrion crows, while the same occurs among the hooded crows on the other side of the contact zone.

Clearly, then, only the outward appearance of the two species inhibits hybridization. The authors attribute this to assortative mating (rather than to ecological selection), the advantage of which is not clear, and it would lead to the rapid appearance of streams of new lineages, and possibly even species, through mutual attraction between mutants. Unnikrishnan and Akhila propose, instead, that koinophilia is a more parsimonious explanation for the resistance to hybridization across the contact zone, despite the absence of physiological, anatomical, or genetic barriers to such hybridization. The carrion crow is also found in the mountains, forests, and cities of Japan.

== Behaviour and ecology ==
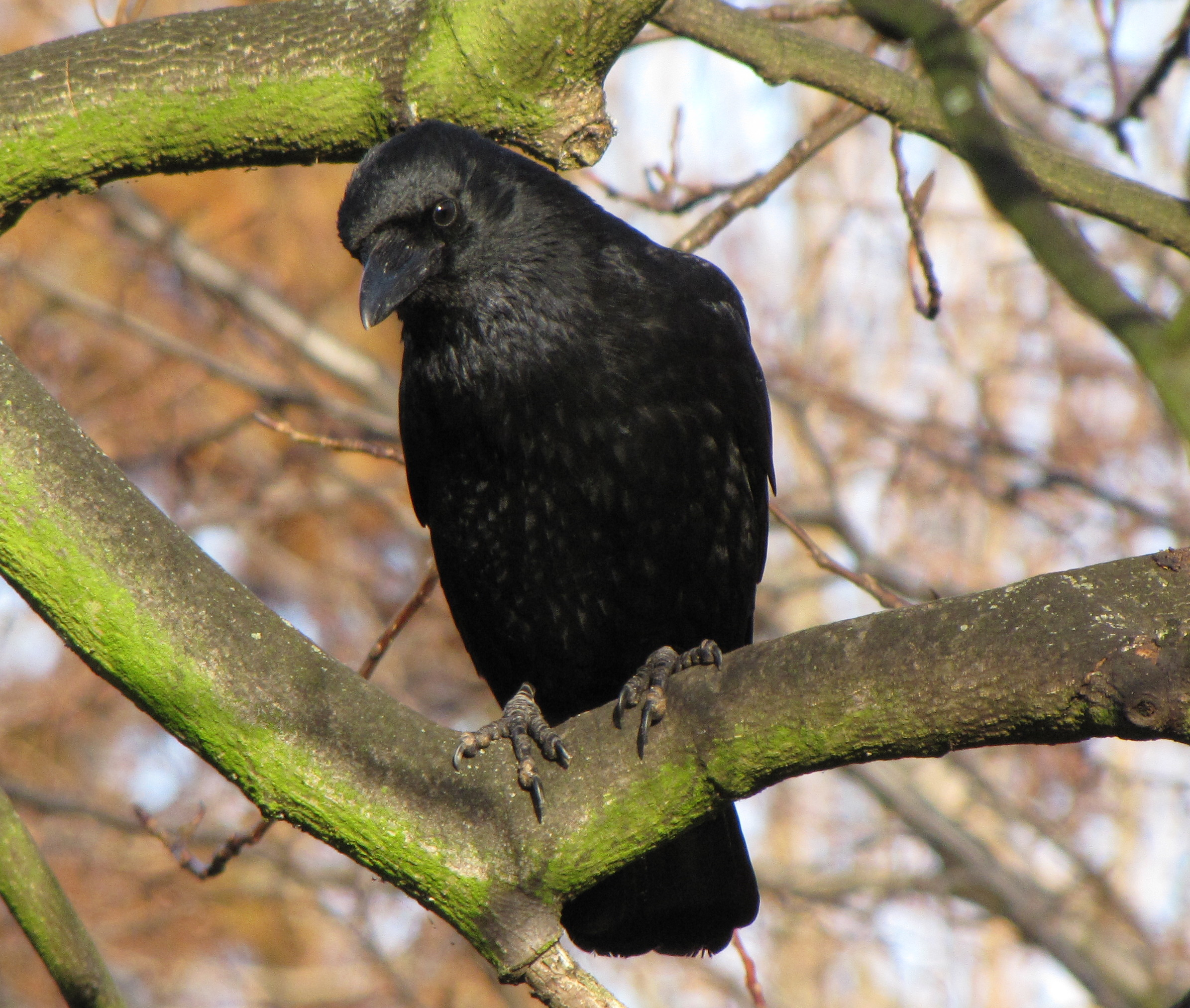
In Southend-on-Sea, England

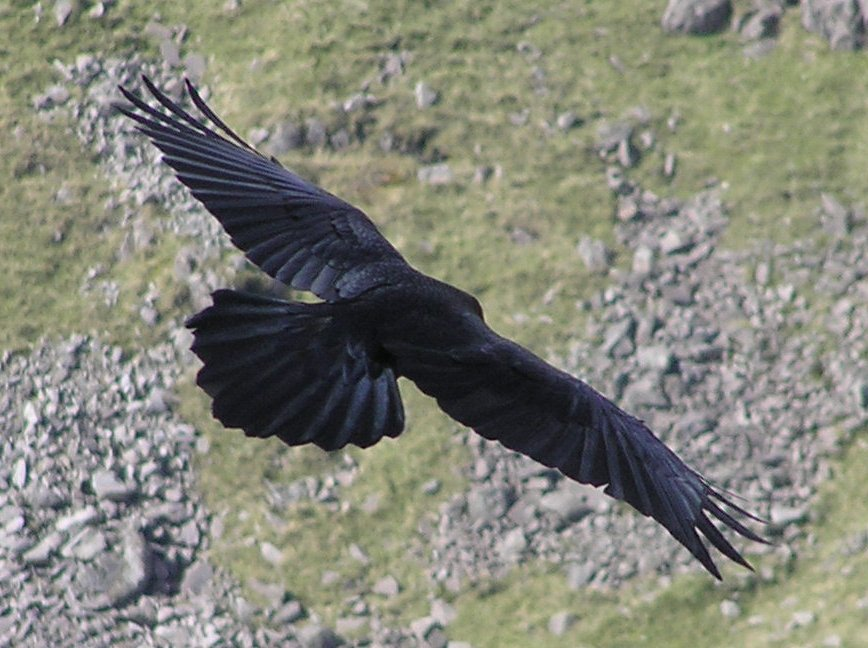
In flight

In distinguishing them, the rook is generally gregarious and the crow largely solitary, but rooks occasionally nest in isolated trees, and crows may feed with rooks; moreover, crows are often sociable in winter roosts. The most distinctive feature is the voice. The rook has a high-pitched kaaa, but the crow's guttural, slightly vibrant, deeper croaked kraa is distinct from any note of the rook.

The carrion crow is noisy, perching on a vantage point such as a building or the top of a tree and calling three or four times in quick succession, with a slight pause between each series of croaks. During each series of calls, a crow may perform an accompanying gesture, raising its shoulders and bowing its head and neck downwards with each caw. The wingbeats are slower and more deliberate than those of the rook.

Carrion crows can become tame near humans, and can often be found near areas of human activity or habitation, including cities, moors, woodland, sea cliffs, and farmland, where they compete with other social birds such as gulls, other corvids, and ducks for food in parks and gardens.

The carrion crow can be seen performing bowing gestures while cawing.

Other vocalizations of the carrion crow include clicking.

Like other species of corvids, carrion crows actively harass predators and competitors that enter their territories or threaten them or their offspring, and engage in group mobbing behaviour as a method to defend themselves.

=== Intelligence ===
Like many corvids, carrion crows are very intelligent. For example, they can discriminate between numbers up to 30, flexibly switch between rules, and recognise human and crow faces. Given the difference in brain architecture in crows compared to primates, these abilities suggest that their intelligence is realised as a product of convergent evolution.

=== Diet ===
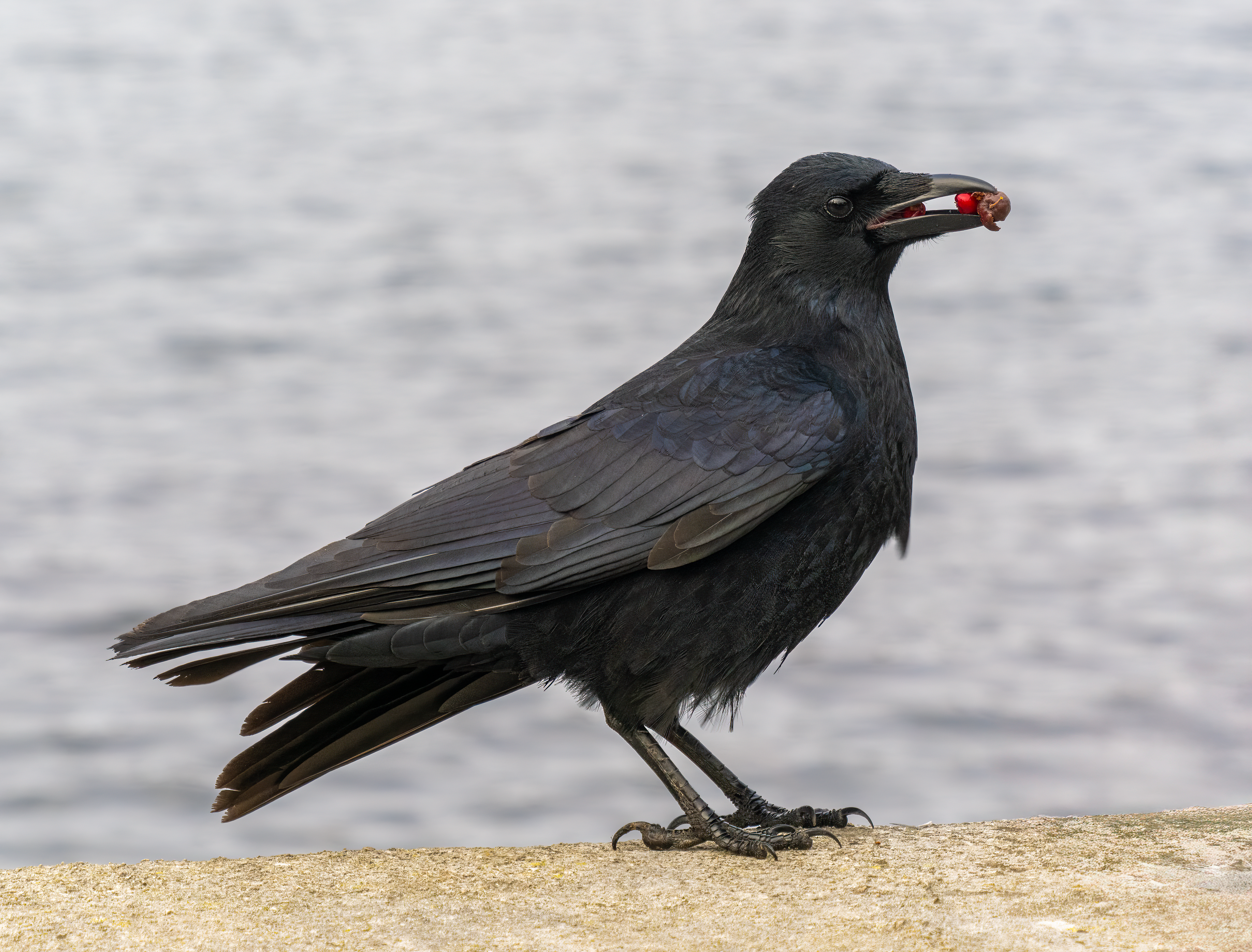
With berries in London

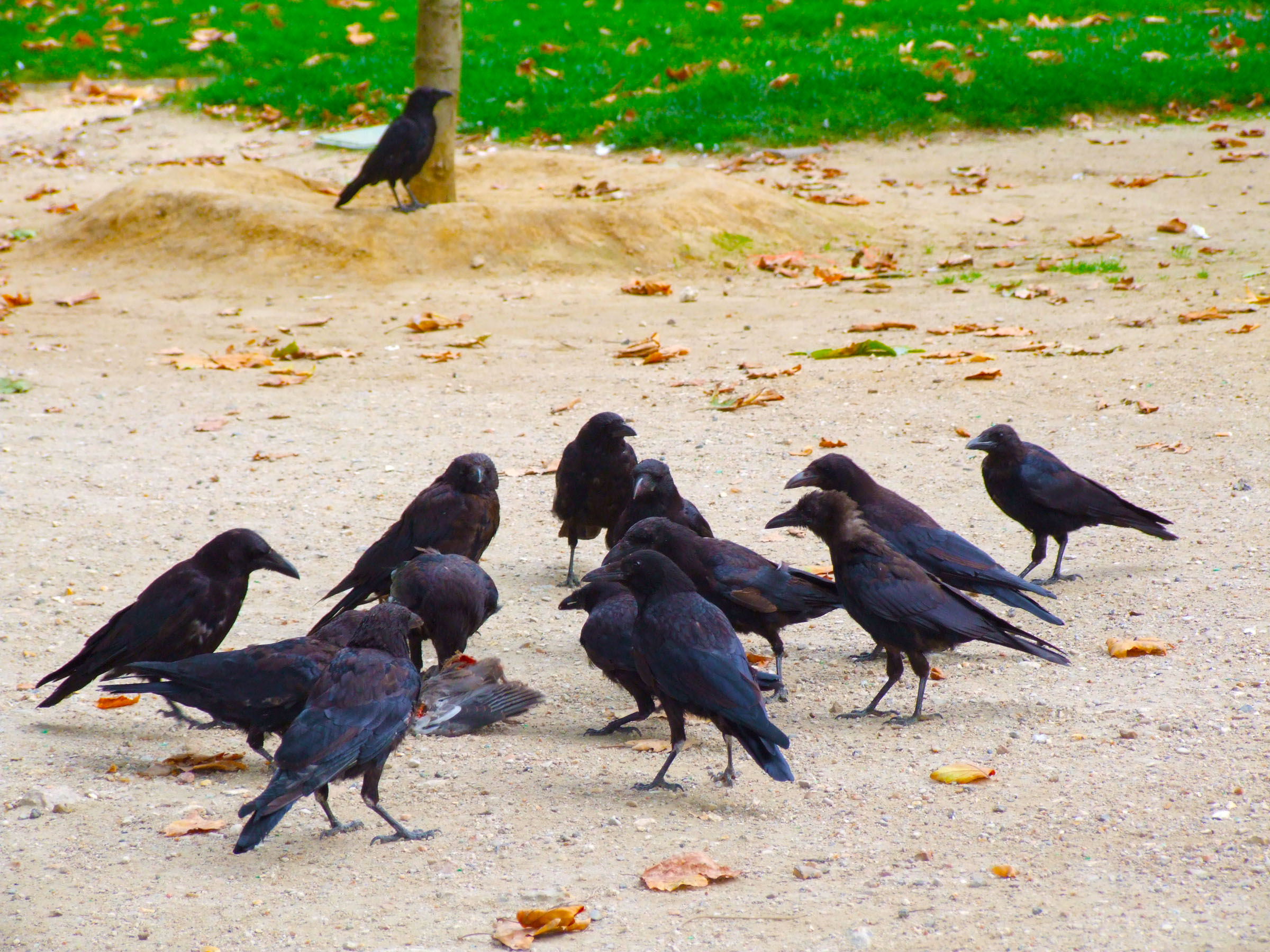
Scavenging around a dead bird in Paris, France

Though an eater of carrion of all kinds, the carrion crow also eats insects, earthworms, other invertebrates, grain, fruits, seeds, nuts, small mammals, amphibians, fish, scraps of human food, and eggs it steals. Crows are scavengers by nature, which is why they tend to frequent sites inhabited by humans to feed on their household waste. Crows also harass birds of prey or even foxes for their kills. Crows actively hunt and occasionally co-operate with other crows to make kills and are sometimes seen catching ducklings for food. Due to their gregarious lifestyle and defensive abilities, carrion crows have few natural predators, but powerful raptors such as the Eurasian goshawk, peregrine falcon, Eurasian eagle-owl, and golden eagle readily hunt them, and crows can become an important prey item locally.

=== Nesting ===
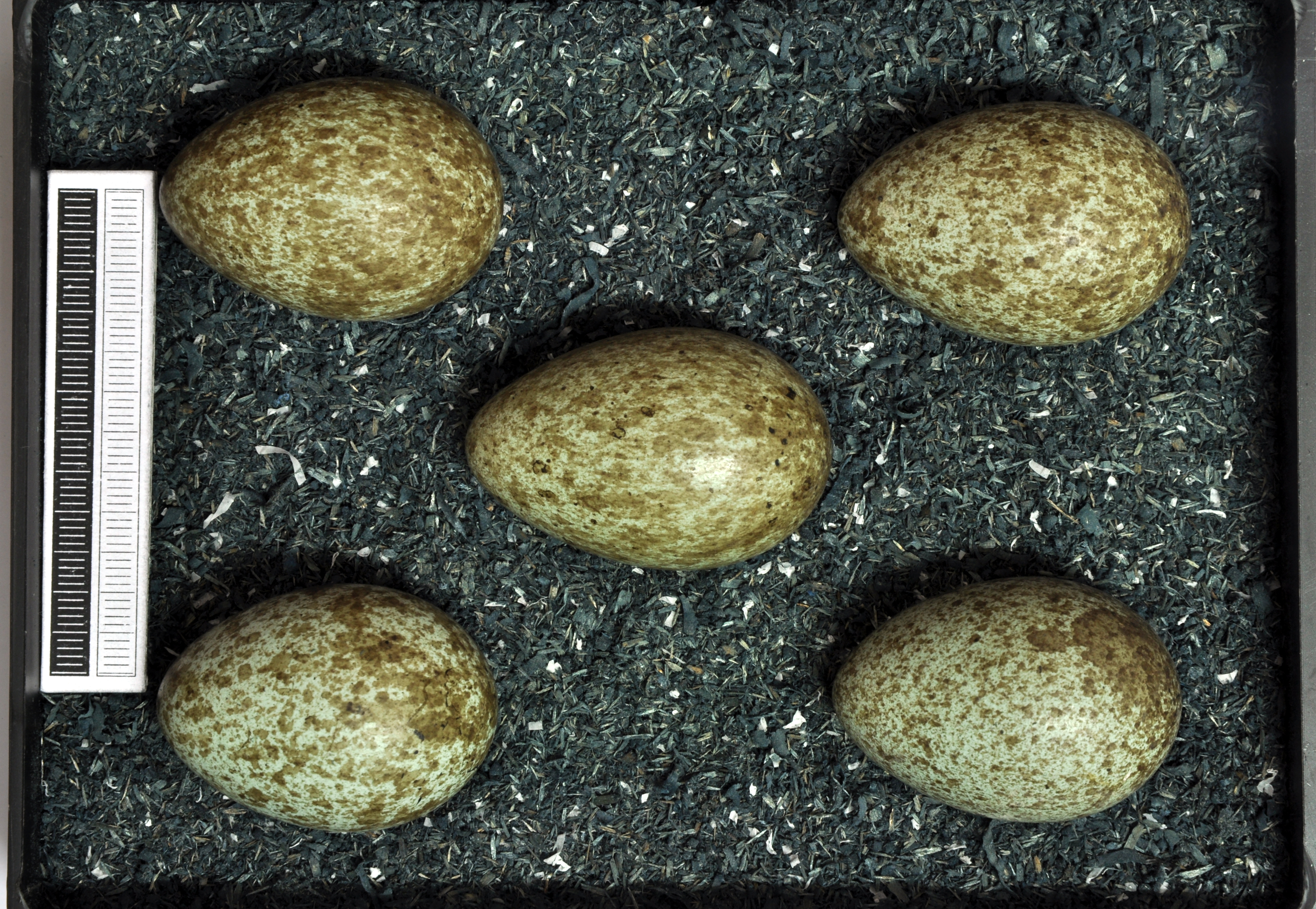
Eggs, collection of Museum Wiesbaden

The bulky stick nest is usually placed in a tall tree, but cliff ledges, old buildings, and pylons may be used as well. Nests are also occasionally placed on or near the ground. The nest resembles that of the common raven, but is less bulky. The three or four brown-speckled blue or greenish eggs are incubated for 18–20 days by the female alone, that is fed by the male. The young fledge around 29–30 days.

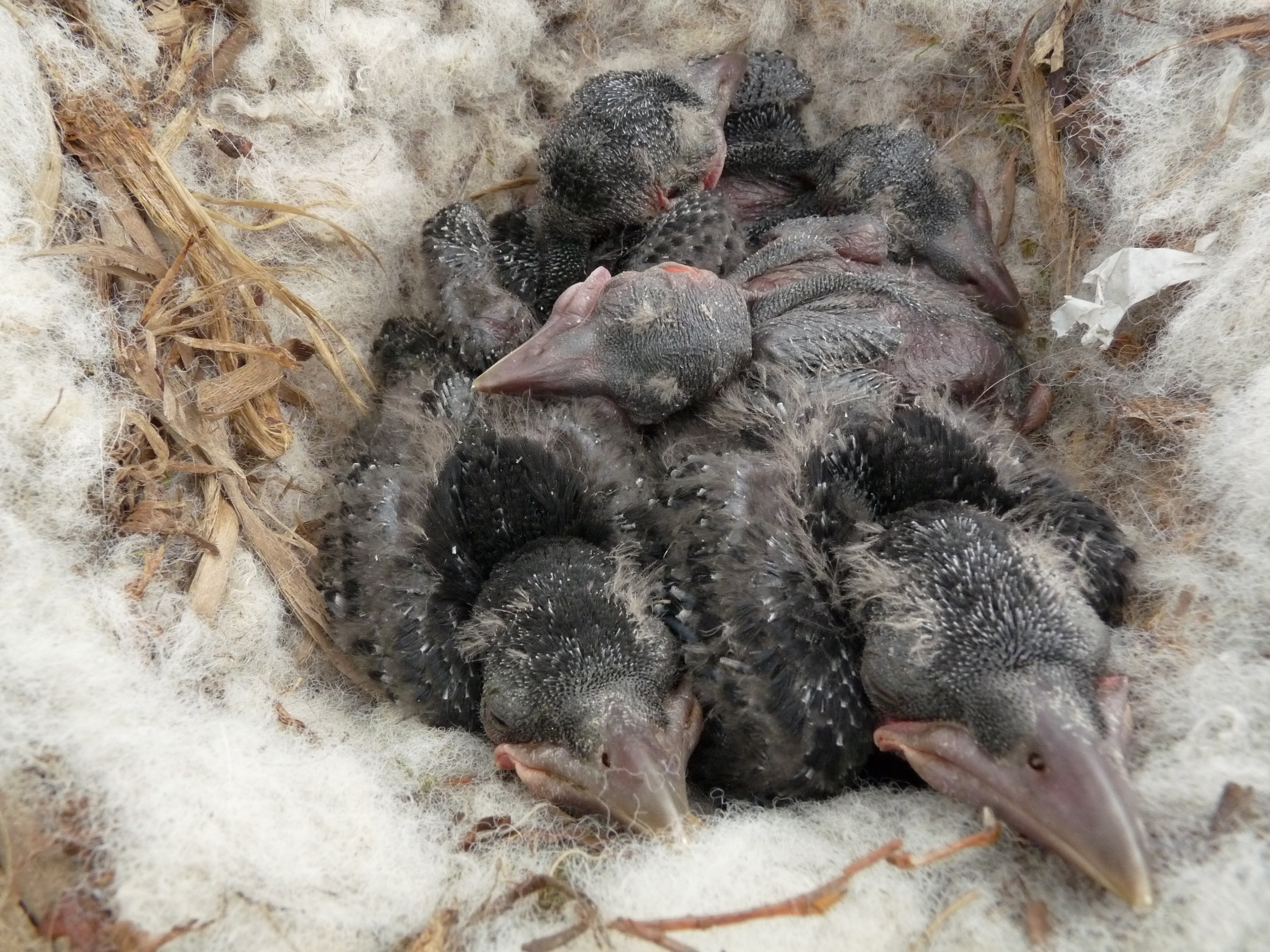
Chicks in the nest

Not uncommonly, offspring from the previous year stay around to help rear the new hatchlings. Instead of seeking out a mate, it looks for food and assists the parents in feeding the young.
