= Curious (disambiguation) =

Being curious means being inquisitive and tending to investigate or explore, in the passive sense as strange, surprising, odd, or as a euphemism for erotic as in 'curious art'.

Curious may also refer to:

== Music ==
- Curious (single album), a 2024 single album by South Korean girl group Unis
- "Curious" (Danny Fernandes song)
- "Curious" (Hayley Kiyoko song)
- "Curious" (Tony Yayo song)
- "Curious", a song by Fiestar
- "Curious", a song by Franz Ferdinand from Hits to the Head
- "Curious", a song by Momoland from Great!

== Other uses ==
- Curious (fragrance), a women's fragrance from Elizabeth Arden, endorsed by Britney Spears
- Bi-curious, a person curious for a relationship or sexual activity with a person of the sex they do not favor
- Curious (My Hero Academia), a character in the manga series My Hero Academia

== See also ==
- Curiosity (disambiguation)
- Curio (disambiguation)
