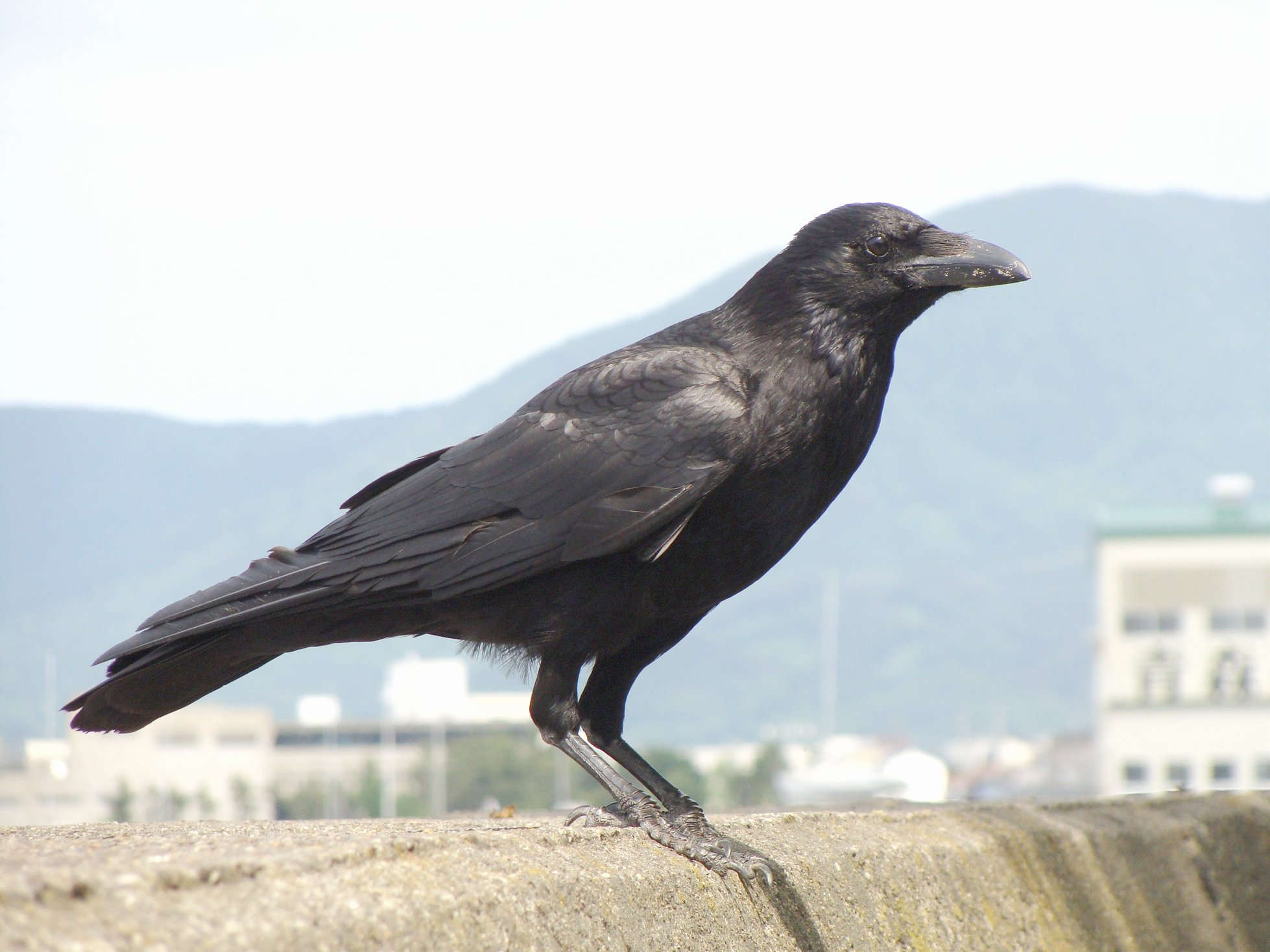
- Corvus corone orientalis in Aomori, Japan.

Scientific classification
- Kingdom: Animalia
- Phylum: Chordata
- Class: Aves
- Order: Passeriformes
- Family: Corvidae
- Genus: Corvus
- Species: C. corone
- Subspecies: C. c. orientalis

Trinomial name
- Corvus corone orientalis Eversmann, 1841

Synonyms
- Corvus orientalis

= Eastern carrion crow =

Subspecies of bird

The eastern carrion crow (Corvus corone orientalis, originally a separate species as Corvus orientalis) is a member of the crow family and a subspecies of the carrion crow. Differences from the nominate subspecies include a larger size, at a length about 500 millimetres (20 in), and more graduated outer tail feathers. The eastern carrion crow is found in Siberia from the Yenisei to Japan, south to Central Asia, Afghanistan, Eastern Iran, Kashmir, Tibet and northern China. They generally lay three to five eggs in trees or buildings. The eggs show no difference from the nominate subspecies.
