= Curiosity (1967 film) =

- Directed by: Borivoj Dovniković
- Written by: Borivoj Dovniković; Dragutin Vunak
- Production company: Zagreb Film
- Release date: 28 June 1967
- Running time: 8 minutes
- Country: Yugoslavia
- Language: Serbo-Croatian

Curiosity (Serbo-Croatian: Znatiželja) is a 1967 Yugoslavian cartoon.

== Plot ==
A man is seated on a bench. He has a paper bag next to him. Over the course of the cartoon, passersby try to find out what he keeps in the bag.

== Awards ==
1967 Krakow Film Festival Special Mention: International Competition (Borivoj Dovnikovic-Bordo)

1967 Leipzig DOK Festival Golden Dove: Borivoj Dovnikovic-Bordo
