= Curiosity (website) =

- Website type: Online education aggregator
- Available in: English
- Website: curiosity.com
- Registration: Optional
- Launched: January 2014; 12 years ago
- Current status: Offline

Curiosity was an online education website.

The site aggregated content from various online educational and instructional resources (such as courses, articles, and videos), which could be filtered by subjects and topics, course cost, and other factors.

== History ==
Curiosity was originally founded by Gabe Vehovsky, Discovery Communications chief of digital strategy and digital businesses.

He saw Curiosity as a "vertically centric marketplace" for online learning.

In November 2014, Curiosity was spun out of Discovery with Vehovsky as CEO; Discovery remains a content partner for the service.

At the same time, the company raised $6 million in a Series A funding round from a number of Chicago-based investors, including Pritzker Group Venture Capital, Origin Ventures, Chicago Ventures, and Corazon Capital.

== Discontinuation ==
In 2020, the website was discontinued. It was initially integrated with the Discovery website, where all links to the former Curiosity website would be redirected.

Later in September 2020, it was found that the redirection has stopped as well, and links to Curiosity website do not work anymore.
