= Gaius Scribonius Curio =

Gaius Scribonius Curio may refer to:

- Gaius Scribonius Curio (consul)
- Gaius Scribonius Curio (tribune 50 BC)
- Gaius Scribonius Curio (son of Fulvia)
