= Curia TV =

American streaming video service

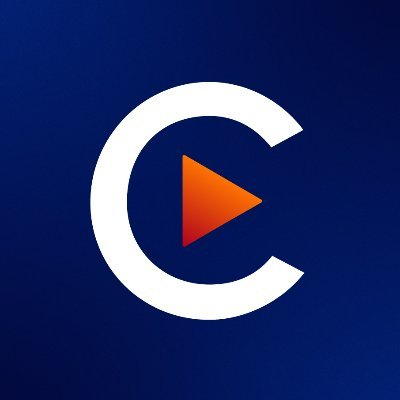
- Company type: Subsidiary
- Website type: OTT video streaming platform
- Available in: English
- Headquarters: Los Angeles, California
- Country of origin: USA
- Area served: Worldwide
- Owner: Edward Walson
- Key people: Edward Walson; Garrett Weaver; Jarod Neece
- Industry: Entertainment
- Products: Streaming media; Video on demand; Digital distribution
- Services: Film distribution; Television distribution
- Website: curia.tv
- Registration: Required
- Launched: June 4, 2021; 5 years ago

Curia TV is an American subscription video on-demand over-the-top streaming service headquartered in Los Angeles, California. Launched on June 4, 2021, It features curated collections of feature and short films. Curia's catalog includes content from studios and various distributors, including Paramount, MGM, Lionsgate, IFC Films, 1091, Kino Lorber, Magnolia, and Oscilloscope.

== History ==
Curia TV was founded by Edward Walson, a theater and film producer of Academy Award winning films. He has produced several of Woody Allen’s movies, including Cafe Society, Irrational Man, Magic in the Moonlight and Blue Jasmine. He is the former president and owner of a New Jersey–based cable company —Service Electric Broadband Cable TV. He is the son of the inventor of cable television, John Walson. The service was first announced on May 26, 2021, and launched on June 4, 2021.

Curia has its headquarters in Los Angeles, California.

Garrett Weaver, formerly an acquisitions executive at Universal Pictures and Entertainment One and Jarod Neece, a former film programmer and event producer at SXSW, spearhead Curia TV's programming efforts.

== Content ==
Curia features award-winning movies and short films. It acquires or licenses new movies from the Film Festival Circuit. Curia has their movies organized into collections like The Circuit and Short Stories that persist month to month. Other collections rotate every month.

The service was launched with movies like Dirty Rotten Scoundrels, The Selfish Giant, Dogtooth, Louder than Bombs, Antichrist, Fish Tank, In the Loop, Last Tango in Paris, Boyhood, Paths of Glory, Cartel Land and others.

Curia is currently available in the United States of America and can be accessed via web browsers on computers, or via application software installed on smartphones, televisions, tablets and other compatible devices. Curia can also be watched on Roku and Amazon Fire.

Curia has launched its podcast called You Had Me at Curia hosted by Ricky Camilleri. The first episode of the podcast was aired on September 22, 2021, featuring a conversation with Abel Ferrera, a film director known for his early 90s crime classics King of New York and Bad Lieutenant, who discusses the making of the 1990 thriller.

In December 2021, Curia announced its Creator Spotlight, a hand-picked collection of films chosen by filmmakers.
