= Prima Curia =

Prima Curia was a religious secret society that provided political support for Mobutu Sese Seko as President of Zaire in the 1980s. It was founded by Kitenge Yezu.
