= Eberhard Curio =

German ecologist, ethologist, and conservation biologist (1932–2020)

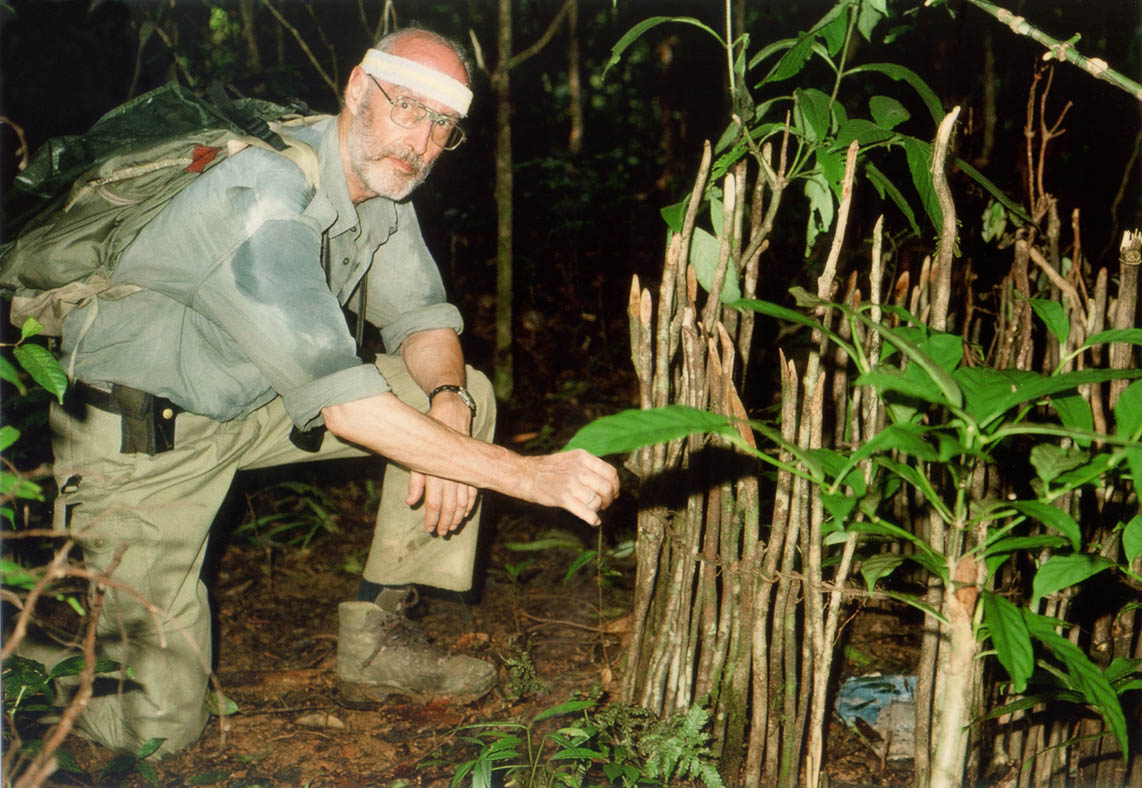
Curio in 2006

Eberhard Curio (22 October 1932 – 11 September 2020) was a German ecologist, ethologist, and conservation biologist. He was involved in conservation in Southeast Asia, particularly in the Philippines.

Curio was educated in Berlin and went in 1950 to the Free University Berlin. In 1957 he obtained his doctorate. Curio worked in 1957 at Ludwigsburg bird sanctuary and as an assistant at the Max Planck Institute for Behavioral Physiology in Seewiesen. He taught zoology at the University of Tübingen from 1964 to 1967 and joined the faculty of the Ruhr University, Bochum in 1968 becoming a professor in 1971. In 1976 he published The Ethology of Predation. He retired in 1998. Curio was involved in the conservation of hornbills, in the discovery of the Panay monitor Varanus mabitang and in the declaration of the Northwest Panay Peninsula Natural Park in the Philippines.
