= List of Curious George episodes =

This is a list of episodes from the children's animated television series, Curious George. Most episodes are set either in the city or in the country. In the city, George lives in an apartment building with The Man in the Yellow Hat and in the country they share a small house near Lake Wanasinklake. This allows George to mirror the experiences of kids who live in an urban environment and those who live in a rural environment. There are exceptions to this; some episodes take place in alternative settings such as an airport or a train station.

== Series overview ==
Season	Segments	Episodes	Originally released		
Season	Segments	Episodes	First released	Last released	Network
1	60	30	September 4, 2006	February 23, 2007	PBS Kids
2	40	20	September 3, 2007	April 22, 2008	PBS Kids
3	22	11	September 1, 2008	April 22, 2009	PBS Kids
4	18	9	September 8, 2009	June 14, 2010	PBS Kids
5	20	10	September 6, 2010	May 6, 2011	PBS Kids
6	20	10	September 5, 2011	June 25, 2012	PBS Kids
7	12	6	December 3, 2012	April 24, 2013	PBS Kids
8	12	6	February 10, 2014	May 21, 2014	PBS Kids
9	12	6	October 28, 2014	April 1, 2015	PBS Kids
10	28	15	September 3, 2018	December 10, 2018	Family Jr.
11	29	15	May 6, 2019	August 12, 2019	Family Jr.
12	29	15	February 3, 2020	February 21, 2020	Family Jr.
13	30	15	July 15, 2020	December 11, 2020	Peacock
14	29	15	October 21, 2021		Peacock
15	28	15	March 17, 2022		Peacock

== Episodes ==
=== Season 1 (2006–07) ===
No. overall	No. in season	Title	Directed by	Written by	Storyboard by	Original release date	Prod. code
1	1	"Curious George Flies a Kite"	Scott Heming	Joe Fallon Based on the book by: Margret and H. A. Rey	Phil Weinstein	September 4, 2006	102b
1	1	"From Scratch"	Scott Heming	Sandra Willard	Kirk Hanson	September 4, 2006	111a
"Curious George Flies a Kite": George wakes up on a windy day in the country. His friend Bill introduces him to a kite, which George wants to fly. However, Bill must go home and George cannot play with the kite until he returns. His curiosity gets the best of him and he soon finds himself flying around the countryside, even taking his furry friend, Jumpy Squirrel, with him. "From Scratch": On their way to the museum, the Man with the Yellow Hat and George discover that Gnocchi, a kindhearted feline, has been accused of scratching the booths in Chef Pisghetti's restaurant. George isn't sure that it was Gnocchi and sets out to solve the mystery. George uses reasoning to find out that the scratches he had seen on the booths were not like scratches he had seen Gnocchi make on the door and he uses pieces of food to measure the length and depth of the scratches.
2	2	"Curious George's Home for Pigeons"	Scott Heming and Steve Socki	Joe Fallon	Sharon Forward	September 5, 2006	101b
2	2	"Out of Order"	Steve Socki	Joe Fallon	Dave Williams and Max Martinez	September 5, 2006	109b
"Curious George's Home for Pigeons": George has found himself a new feathery friend in the city, Compass, one of the Doorman's homing pigeons which he keeps on the roof of the apartment building, but the only thing is, Compass has a bad sense of direction. When the Man says George is not allowed to let pigeons inside the apartment, George decides to build Compass a new home on the balcony outside their apartment, eventually deciding on a tree, but soon finds out building a tree is not as easy as it seems. "Out of Order": One day, George is walking the street of his apartment building trying to find something to do when he notices a woman leaving numbered boxes outside every building. He decides to be a helpful monkey and return them to her until his friends Steve and Betsy tell him that she is a postal worker and that leaving boxes for people is her job. They go on a race to see who can finish returning packages first. Winner plays Steve's video game. Steve has a plan to simply run fast but George and Betsy come up with a plan to sort all of the packages by the number of the buildings they go to.
3	3	"Zeros to Donuts"	Jeff McGrath	Joe Fallon Based on the part of "Curious George Learns the Alphabet" by: Margret and H. A. Rey	Jeff McGrath	September 6, 2006	101a
3	3	"Curious George, Stain Remover"	Steve Socki	Joe Fallon Based on the part of "Curious George Gets a Medal" by: Margret and H. A. Rey	James Beihold	September 6, 2006	104a
"Zeros to Donuts": On a sunny Saturday, George and the Man decide that it is a good day for donuts and eggs. The Man tells George to write down the number of eggs they have in the refrigerator but George does not write anything because they had none. The Man then realizes that after teaching George everything for so long he forgot to teach him about nothing. He says that zero alone means nothing but when added to smaller numbers makes them bigger. The Man then sends George off to get the donuts with a paper that has an order of 1 Dozen Donuts, but George does not know about a dozen and changes the order to 100 dozen donuts. After seeing just how many donuts 100 dozen make he tries to do anything to get away with only one dozen. "Curious George, Stain Remover": George and The Man have just brought home a new rug. The Man thinks it is so perfect he would like to take a picture of it. But when he runs out to get some camera batteries George decides to have a drink of grape juice, only to spill it on the rug by mistake. George knows how to clean it up, though—a lot of soap and water, but uses so much he floods the entire house with suds and water. Luckily he knows about the time his farming friends, The Renkins' basement got flooded too and they cleaned it out with a pump. George finds the pump at their house but has no easy way to get it back home.
4	4	"Buoy Wonder"	Steve Socki	Raye Lankford	Toni Vian	September 7, 2006	108a
4	4	"Roller Monkey"	Frank Marino	Lazar Saric	Frank Marino	September 7, 2006	106a
"Buoy Wonder": George is excited to see a country boat building contest but on the way, he sees something interesting: a boat that carries cars on the water. Bill shows George his boat and has him watch it for him while he has to run off. But when an accident causes Bill's boat to sink and is no longer able to float, George has to build him a new one so he can use it in the contest instead. All of the boats George build however seem to have the same problem and decides to look at how the boats made by the other contestants were built so he can build one that floats. "Roller Monkey": The owners of the local city toy store have a problem: No roller skates were on sale. When they see George they decide to give him a few pairs to ride around in and advertise for them. Fortunately, George has been curious about wheels on feet since he saw the man roll on a toy car. George loves his skates but realizes he needs more practice with them. He is getting good when the Doorman's wiener dog, Hundley, sees that he would like to try it as well. Later on, Gnocchi tags along as well and uses Hundley as her skateboard when she sees kids doing it at the local skatepark.
5	5	"Curious George on Time"	Scott Heming	Joe Fallon	David Schwartz	September 13, 2006	107a
5	5	"Curious George's Bunny Hunt"	Scott Heming	Joe Fallon Based on the part of "Curious George Flies a Kite" by: Margret and H. A. Rey	Linda Miller and Broni Likomanov	September 13, 2006	102a
"Curious George on Time": George's friend and the man's assistant, Professor Wiseman, has a pretty interesting habit-building and fixing clocks. She has just finished work on a very interesting clock where a band comes out and plays every hour. But when Compass comes flying in and George tries to show him the clock he accidentally breaks the minute hand and then ends up taking it completely apart when he tries to fix it. George goes to the library to try to find out how to fix it but not from a book. The library has a big clock tower on top that the whole city depends upon, but the clock's chime jump-scares George, only to let him break the big clock as well. "Curious George's Bunny Hunt": George is in the country seeing Bill's new bunny hutch. Bill is the proud owner of seven bunnies and their rabbit mother. George wants to pet one of the bunnies but Bill has to run off on his paper route before he can let him do that. George tries to pet one but when he opens the hutch they all run off leaving George in a big game of hide and seek to find them all.
6	6	"Curious George Takes a Job"	Scott Heming and Steve Socki	Joe Fallon Based on the book "Curious George Takes a Job" by: Margret and H. A. Rey	Toni Vian	September 14, 2006	103
6	6	"Curious George Takes Another Job"	Scott Heming	Joe Fallon Based on the book "Curious George Takes a Job" by: Margret and H. A. Rey	Rossen Varbanov and Rhoydon Shishido	September 14, 2006	103
"Curious George Takes a Job": George is on a city-wide smelling spree when he comes across Chef Pisghetti's kitchen. Chef Pisghetti is cooking a meal for a famous restaurant critic. Then George comes across some pasta the chef was cooking and had placed in a pot. He notices that it had been crisp but is now all floppy. George then decides that kitchens are magic and finds other things to place in the "floppification pot". "Curious George Takes Another Job": Continuing from the previous part, George wants to continue helping Chef Pisghetti in his kitchen but the chef has no work for him. The chef has a friend named Mr. Glass, a billionaire who owns an apartment building called the Glass Palace and has a love of all things unique. He hires George as a window washer. Things go well until George sees some shadows in one room that look like jungle animals and decides to paint them. As a result, this causes Mr. Glass to get angry and orders 2 painters to chase George but is rescued by The Man With The Yellow Hat, although Mr. Glass appreciates the room with the jungle animals and decides to rent it out.
7	7	"Curious George, Door Monkey"	Frank Marino	Joe Fallon	Frank Marino	September 15, 2006	108b
7	7	"Curious George Goes Up the River"	Steve Socki and Scott Heming	Joe Fallon	Rossen Varbanov	September 15, 2006	105a
"Curious George, Door Monkey": While the Doorman goes to the drycleaners to have his shirt cleaned following an accident with an oil can, he leaves Hundley in charge of the lobby and tasks him to wait for a huge delivery that contains autographed balls for a sports memorabilia collector. When the delivery man arrives with the balls, he mistakes George for the Doorman and has him sign for the packages. George opens up all of the packages, thinking they are for him, and plays with all the balls, but when Hundley shows him who they belong to, they must work together to re-package the balls. "Curious George Goes Up the River": George and The Man with the Yellow Hat go to the country to feed some ducks, but have to put their plans on hold when the Renkins' chicks are missing and they must find them. George, however, finds a raft on the edge of the river and soon, along with Jumpy Squirrel, finds himself-literally-going up the creek without a paddle. They eventually find a way to stop but they must now find their way back home to the Renkins' farm.
8	8	"Curious George and the Invisible Sound"	Scott Heming	Bruce Akiyama	Llyn Hunter	September 18, 2006	112b
8	8	"Curious George, a Peeling Monkey"	Frank Marino	Raye Lankford	Phil Weinstein	September 18, 2006	110a
"Curious George and the Invisible Sound": The Man with the Yellow Hat is studying insect behavior in the country. George eventually tires of watching and decides to go to bed, but a strange and annoying sound in the house keeps him awake. He tries to track down what the sound is but he cannot seem to find it Then the Man tells him it is the sound of a cricket. George then tries to track down the cricket and remove it from the house so he can get some sleep. "Curious George, a Peeling Monkey": It's Professor Wiseman's birthday and The Man with the Yellow Hat has bought her a present which George is determined to open. The Man decides to take George's mind off of the present by having him unwrap some oranges for a salad, but soon George wants to know all about different kind of wrapping which leads him down to the department store.
9	9	"Curious George, Dog Counter"	Frank Marino	Joe Fallon	Phil Weinstein	September 26, 2006	106b
9	9	"Squirrel for a Day"	Scott Heming	Sandra Willard	Skip Jones	September 26, 2006	105b
"Curious George, Dog Counter": Professor Wiseman is taking George to his first dog show which, to his disappointment, is not a show performed entirely by dogs. When he gets home, The Man with the Yellow Hat wants to hear about all the dogs but George can only remember three. He goes back to try to take note of them all and eventually brings them all home where he must find a way to organize them to count them easily. "Squirrel for a Day": The Man with the Yellow Hat has a predicament. He has to write a tribute speech for Professor Wiseman. Also, the country house cupboards are too small to hold all of their food. When Bill tells him how squirrels store food in the ground after seeing Jumpy Squirrel do it, George decides to do the same thing to their food. When the Man finds out, he tells George that squirrels bury nuts, seeds and things that grow. George decides to plant and grow various objects around the house including the Man's speech which he wants to grow the rest of.
10	10	"Curious George Discovers the 'Poles"	Frank Marino and Steve Socki	Bruce Akiyama	Rossen Varbanov	September 27, 2006	107b
10	10	"Curious George Finds His Way"	Scott Heming	Ken Scarborough	David Schwartz	September 27, 2006	104b
"Curious George Discovers the 'Poles": George has gone to his favorite country place, Lake Wanasinklake, where he finds Bill taking pictures in the lagoon. Bill has caught not fish, but tadpoles and he asks George to look after them as they grow up because "they do some amazing things". When George figures they are growing tired of the same, small fishbowl, he decides to release them into the lagoon. Later he tries to do anything to get them back but only catches a small green creature which is not one of his tadpoles. "Curious George Finds His Way": George has to stay with Hundley in the lobby as the apartment gets cleaned but Hundley does not want George to eat his messy snack in the lobby. After George and Hundley get locked out in the alley behind the apartment building, Hundley runs off trying to find a better way in. George follows him and they eventually meet in a place very far away from home. They decide that, since it is dark out and they can not see their way home, they can hear their way home instead.
11	11	"Water to Ducks"	Scott Heming	Joe Fallon	Zhenia Delioussine	September 28, 2006	118b
11	11	"Animal Magnetism"	Scott Heming	Joe Fallon	Scott Sackett and Andrei Svislotski	September 28, 2006	116b
"Water to Ducks": After a rainy country day, George finds a flock of ducks that have taken refuge in a puddle and spends the day playing with them. The next day George sees that the puddle has shrunk and the ducks are flying off one by one in search of more water. He is determined to do anything to get them to stay around. Then he sees his pool, filled with water and empties it out to get it to the top of the hill where the ducks are, but afterward, he must find a way to re-fill it. "Animal Magnetism": George has finished drawing the greatest drawing ever, but The Man with the Yellow Hat does not have any good magnets to hang it on the refrigerator with. He and George go to the museum to find more and discover the museum's new magnetorium where George learns all about magnetism. He learns that only certain thing attract to a magnet and that any metal that is attracted to a magnet can be turned into one. Soon, George loses his drawing and his quest to find it leads his to the junkyard and a powerful electromagnet.
12	12	"Doctor Monkey"	Scott Heming	Joe Fallon	Joe Daniello	September 29, 2006	114a
12	12	"Curious George the Architect"	Frank Marino	Lazar Saric	Frank Jen	September 29, 2006	117b
"Doctor Monkey": The Man with the Yellow Hat takes George to his checkup. George has never seen a doctor's office or a doctor before and becomes curious. While Dr. Geshund loses track of time while on break, George puts on his coat and uses his equipment to try to track down a strange "bloopy" sound he had been hearing and, along the way, has to help several patients such as a woman with allergies a man with a sprained arm and a woman with hiccups in the way only a monkey can. "Curious George the Architect": There is a big construction project going on on George's street and George is curious as to what is going on. He comes upon a very active and noisy place and sees everything that is going on. When he returns the next day to find the site abandoned, he winds up going on a quest with Gnocchi and Compass to retrieve a loose $10 bill. Along the way, he needs to use several pieces of equipment, such as jackhammers, excavators, and cement mixers, to get it out of a few tight places, before he gets caught.
13	13	"Zoo Night"	Frank Marino	Craig Miller	Robert Sledge	October 6, 2006	111b
13	13	"Charkie Escapes"	Scott Heming	Raye Lankford	Llyn Hunter	October 6, 2006	129a
"Zoo Night": After watching a live video of the new panda on the zoo website, George rushes to the zoo to see it, but gets locked inside after closing time. George tries to find the exit, but opens the wrong doors and finds himself surrounded by giraffes, meerkats and penguins. George must put the animals back in their homes. "Charkie Escapes": George is trying to get up his game and practice soccer, but Steve & Betsy's Aunt Margret says he must dogsit their dog Charkie. Charkie is very wild and playful and does anything she can to run away from the back alley where George is trying to practice. It seems like every time George has an exit covered, Charkie find another way out. George has to find a way to get her to calm down and sit.
14	14	"Curious George's Rocket Ride"	Frank Marino	Craig Miller Based on the part of "Curious George Gets a Medal" by: Margret and H. A. Rey	Christo Stamboliev	October 9, 2006	109a
14	14	"Curious George, Station Master"	Dean Criswell	Joe Fallon	Pablo Solis	October 9, 2006	110b
"Curious George's Rocket Ride": The Man with the Yellow Hat is about to become the world's first untrained person to fly into space so he can deliver food along with several experimental capsules to the International Space Station. But the spaceship designed by Professor Wiseman's assistants Professor Anthony Pizza and Dr. Alvin Einstein is only designed for someone with four hands, so it's up to George to take over the job and become the world's first monkey in space. George is told that he must activate the system that releases the goods for the station at a certain point and that his spaceship is in an orbit around the Earth so he will eventually get back around to the station. "Curious George, Station Master": George loves to play with his toy train set. When The Man with the Yellow Hat tells him that Bill will be riding home on a train, he takes him to the train station so George can see how a real one works. The Man's friend Mr. Quint has a brother who owns the train station and is the station master and shows George how each train has a number on it and must arrive at a certain time. When Mr. Quint and his brother have business to attend to, George is left in charge of the station and must arrange the trains so they all arrive in counting order. Note: The title is often incorrectly called "Curious George, Train Master".
15	15	"Curious George and the Dam Builders"	Frank Marino	Bruce Akiyama	David Schwartz, Broni Lilkomanov and Max Martinez	October 10, 2006	123b
15	15	"Curious George's Low High Score"	Frank Marino	Craig Miller	Joe Daniello	October 10, 2006	119a
"Curious George and the Dam Busters": George is having the time of his life playing with his toy boat in a large pond. After one day of playing, though he comes back the next to see his pond almost empty. George finds out that the water is being held back by a dam that was built by a family of beavers, and they will not let him play in their pond. George gets the idea to build a dam of his own to make a new pond. He later finds out that water is just as important a part of a beaver's home as the dam. "Curious George's Low High Score": George comes across his friends Steve and Betsy playing basketball in the city. When George tries to play, he finds out he is not very good and winds up losing the ball when it accidentally lands on a moving pickup truck. They then decide to play miniature golf instead. After Steve tells him that when playing basketball, the winner is the person that has made the most baskets has the highest score, George figures it is the same way for golf. Then Betsy tells him that in golf, the lowest score wins. Since they find the park mini golf course too hard, they decide to build one of their own.
16	16	"Curious George Sees Stars"	Frank Marino	Raye Lankford	Christo Stamboliev	October 11, 2006	116a
16	16	"Curious George Gets a Trophy"	Dean Criswell	Joe Fallon	Broni Lilkomanov and Max Martinez	October 11, 2006	113b
"Curious George Sees Stars": George wants to be the first person, or monkey in the world to count every star in the sky after Bill tells him that no one has done so. The only problem though is that George can't stay up at night to count all of them. He finds a system to keep track of which stars he has counted because, since the stars cannot be seen in the day, he can only count at night. Later on upon returning to the city, George finds that he cannot see the stars even at night because the city has way more light at night than the country. "Curious George Gets a Trophy": The Man with the Yellow Hat has just won another trophy and George really wants to have one of his own. After helping Chef Pisghetti, though, George winds up getting one and is the Chef's own Ice Cream Gnocchi, but it seems like it is always melting or splattering because he does not handle it correctly.
17	17	"George Makes a Stand"	Frank Marino	Gentry Menzel	Andrei Svislotski	October 18, 2006	125a
17	17	"Curious George Sees the Light"	Dean Criswell	Cate Lieuwen	Llyn Hunter	October 18, 2006	117a
"George Makes a Stand": George and The Man with the Yellow Hat are looking at the Man's old childhood pictures when George sees one of the man's old lemonade stand. The Man with the Yellow Hat tells George about the time he got a new soccer ball because of it. George decides to make one of his own to replace his busted up soccer ball. George has trouble finding a good location to set up shop, and when he finally finds a good place, people give him money. "Curious George Sees the Light": One country day, George sees that a new traffic light is being installed along the road. Never having seen one before, not even in the city, George becomes curious. He sees that cars stop at a red light but not at a green light making him guess that most people preferred a red light to a green one. Since the light is always changing, George is disappointed because there is not much time for people to enjoy one color and he changes the light so that all of one side is one color. This winds up confusing drivers on the road until Officer Quint shows up and explains how a traffic light works. It is good for drivers but not Jumpy Squirrel who can no longer cross the road on a tree branch which was cut in front of the light and can't cross the dangerous road itself.
18	18	"Candy Counter"	Frank Marino	Sandra Willard	Pablo Solis	October 19, 2006	113a
18	18	"Curious George, Rescue Monkey"	Dean Criswell	Chuck Tately	Pablo Solis	October 19, 2006	118a
"Candy Counter": George has gone to Mabel's Department Store where they find that a girl named Cayley has opened up a new candy counter. George notices that all of her candies are unique, each in a different shape and color After Cayley has to run out to buy more ingredients she leaves George in charge of the counter. George is trying to examine the different types of candies when he knocks over all of the candy displays and must now find a way to count all of the candy and re-stack it. "Curious George, Rescue Monkey": When George's antics have caused him to become caught in some bars on his balcony, the Man With the Yellow Hat frantically calls Rescue Squad 86 to help him out. After saving him from his sticky situation George becomes curious as to how firefighters do their job and all of the tools they use. But it seems like every time George tries to help out in the station he only ends up causing trouble. Soon, though they get called to the museum where it seems Compass the Pigeon is stuck in a high place and it seems like only a certain monkey can help.
19	19	"The Truth About George Burgers"	Scott Heming	Cusi Cram	Liz Holzman	October 20, 2006	115b
19	19	"Curious George in the Dark"	Frank Marino	Bruce Akiyama	Robert Sledge and Broni Likomanov	October 20, 2006	114b
"The Truth About George Burgers": Chef Pisghetti has come up with a new recipe for Giardino Burgers-hamburgers containing all veggies. He trusts George to take a box of prepared burgers out to his truck to get sent to the annual firefighter's picnic but George accidentally puts them on the wrong truck. Having lost the burgers George recalls that the chef's recipe was all pictures. He finds the notepad where the chef had drawn everything and mistakes the chef's garden expansion plan for his burger recipe, making burger patties out of dirt. "Curious George in the Dark": George is playing with his ball in the country when he loses it in a dark cave. He goes inside to look for it and gets scared by what he sees as monsters in the cave. Seeing that the same kinds of monsters are in his room, George becomes scared of the dark until The Man with the Yellow Hat tells him that the "monsters" are just the same objects as they are in the light and gives him a nightlight. Then a thunderstorm knocks out the power to the country house making him scared again. Remembering what The Man said, George returns to the cave with his trusty flashlight and Jumpy Squirrel to find out if the monsters really are monsters.
20	20	"The Clean, Perfect Yellow Hat"	Dean Criswell	Joe Fallon	John Holmquist	October 23, 2006	122b
20	20	"Bee Is for Bear"	Dean Criswell	Bruce Akiyama	Broni Likomanov and Max Martinez	October 23, 2006	119b
"The Clean, Perfect Yellow Hat": The Man with the Yellow Hat has just gotten his yellow hat back from the cleaners and it is clean, fresh, and perfect, but George's antics cause the hat to blow away and end up with a twig inside it. George tries to fix it, but pulls a thread loose, making a stain, and then a hole in the hat. He then needs to find a way to fix the hat before The Man comes home so they can go to the new Planetarium. First, George tries to make a new hat but everything he tries doesn't seem to work. Later, he realizes he just needs to fix the hole in the old hat. "Bee Is for Bear": It is a fall country day and the Renkins have just gotten the latest fresh batch of honey from their own bee farm. George makes a honey sandwich, but a bee interferes with his snack enjoyment. He then sees a bear eating his snack and gets stung by the bee, making him afraid of bees. Later, George and Bill find out that there is a beehive in Bill's backyard and he is determined to get rid of it so the bees don't sting his bunnies. Later, the Renkins show George how bees make honey. George also tries to tell everyone about the bear, but since a bear has not been seen in the area for many years, nobody believes him, until the bear invades Bill's yard and destroys the hive.
21	21	"Surprise Quints"	Dean Criswell	Joe Fallon	John Holmquist	January 15, 2007	128b
21	21	"Muddy Monkey"	Frank Marino	Lazar Saric	Liz Holzman	January 15, 2007	129b
"Surprise Quints": It is Mr. Quint's birthday and his wife wants to throw him a surprise party. To keep him out of the house to prepare for the party, she sends him to George's house where George must keep him busy with his favorite snack, fish crackers. Later, though, he learns that there are five quints-quintuplets. With Mr. Quint there is also Officer Wint Quint, Flint Quint the station master, Sprint Quint the jogger, and Mint Quint the government money printer. George must evenly divide the fish crackers to feed all five of them long enough to not know about the party until it is time. "Muddy Monkey": George is unable take a bath without his favorite bath toy, Sproingy the bubble-blowing frog. He soon runs into Steve and Betsy's pet washing business and learns all about bubbles and how they always wind up round. After losing his bath toy, though, George needs to find it and will not take another bath until he does. This is not good because he is dirty and is tracking dirt everywhere he goes.
22	22	"Curious George Takes a Vacation"	Scott Heming	Raye Lankford	Kelly James	January 16, 2007	120a
22	22	"Curious George and the One That Got Away"	Scott Heming	Bruce Akiyama Based on the part of "Curious George Flies a Kite" by: Margret and H. A. Rey	Broni Likomanov and Max Martinez	January 16, 2007	127b
"Curious George Takes a Vacation": George and The Man with the Yellow Hat are going on a beach vacation in peaceful Hawaii, but when they get to the airport, their plane is delayed. George receives a small toy airplane from the ticket woman but loses it. He goes on a quest to try to hunt it down before they must board their flight but it seems like everyone in the airport is out to stop George from wandering around or causing trouble. "Curious George and the One That Got Away": George learns all about fishing from Mr. Quint at Lake Wannasinklake, but George does not catch any fish in the lake and only catches junk thrown in by other people. Soon, though, George finds an American eel and wants to catch it. He becomes even more determined when Bill says he wants to catch him to "take him home". George would like to catch it but he does not have a fishing rod.
23	23	"Ski Monkey"	Scott Heming	Lazar Saric	Liz Holzman	January 17, 2007	121b
23	23	"George the Grocer"	Frank Marino	Lazar Saric	Broni Likomanov, Max Martinez and Cathy Malkasian	January 17, 2007	126b
"Ski Monkey": A large snowstorm happened overnight in the country and George wants to go outside and play in the snow. But it seems like the snow is too deep to even walk in. Later he comes across a group of kids playing in the snow and they give him a pair of snowshoes as well as a sled to quickly move through the snow. Later, Bill gives him a pair of skis. Soon, George comes across a pig that had wandered out the night before and has to find a way to get it home. "George the Grocer": In the city, George wants an oven (much like an Easy Bake Oven), but the Man with the Yellow Hat says it is too expensive. He goes to the grocery store and, without the owner's knowledge, helps shoppers and improves the business. When the owner notices, he awards George Employee of the Month and pays him, which makes the Man proud.
24	24	"Keep Out Cows"	Frank Marino	Chuck Tately	Christo Stamboliev	January 18, 2007	122a
24	24	"Curious George and the Missing Piece"	Scott Heming	Bruce Akiyama	Christo Stamboliev	January 18, 2007	130b
"Keep Out Cows": George has come across a big field of beautiful wildflowers in the country. He decides to share the wildflowers with Leslie and the rest of the cows but Leslie eats them and they go after the rest. George wants to save the flowers from being eaten by cows. George tries communicating with the cows, distracting them, and building a wall, but nothing seems to work until he uses a strong wall to save one of the flowers causing the cows to not get past the wall. The failed items George uses to save the flowers is arrows but cows go through them, a scarecrow that has an angry face but the cows eat it, and hanging newspapers that the cows crash into. "Curious George and the Missing Piece": George has taken interest in the new dinosaur skeleton in the museum. Professor Wiseman tells him that the skeleton was dug up over time from different bones, which were later assembled together. George decides to find a skeleton of his own and digs a hole where he finds a bone. He then tries to figure out what kind of animal the bone came from, but the problem is that Charkie keeps stealing his bone.
25	25	"Camping with Hundley"	Frank Marino	Chuck Tately	Pablo Solis	January 19, 2007	130a
25	25	"Curious George vs. the Turbo Python 3000"	Scott Heming	Lazar Saric	Scott Sackett	January 19, 2007	112a
"Camping with Hundley": The Man with the Yellow Hat takes George camping. George becomes excited to go again and soon, goes camping with the Doorman and Hundley, but the Doorman has a very different way of camping with a trailer with "all the comforts of home". A thunderstorm knocks out the power source to the trailer and also floods it. The Doorman now has to camp in the traditional way but has no idea how. Fortunately, George remembers everything from his previous camping experience. "Curious George vs. the Turbo Python 3000": At the amusement park, George wants to ride the Turbo Python 3000, only to realize that he is too short to do so. George has a measurement tool of sort on him-a whip of licorice. George has to grow the length of one licorice whip in a day so he can be tall enough to ride. Meanwhile, The Man with the Yellow Hat has a problem of his own. He wants to overcome his fear of roller coasters.
26	26	"Housebound!"	Dean Criswell	Joe Fallon	Mark Garcia	February 19, 2007	121a
26	26	"Curious George Rides a Bike"	Dean Criswell	Chuck Tately Based on the book by: Margret and H. A. Rey	Robert Sledge	February 19, 2007	125b
"Housebound!": George's curiosity about bones leads him to climb the dinosaur skeleton at the museum but falls off and breaks his leg. George is let down when he is told to wear a cast for a few weeks and stay home. Hundley stays with him as his monkey sitter. George begins in a wheelchair and does not know how to use it, but Hundley teaches him how to navigate around the furniture in his apartment. Moments later, George can walk on crutches and Hundley helps him out in the same way. Later, once George can walk on his cast, he goes to places like the park with Hundley. "Curious George Rides a Bike": George sees Bill riding his bike and doing his paper route which make him want to do the same. The Man with the Yellow Hat finds his old bike and adjusts it for George before teaching him how to ride, but George forgets to look where he's going and crashes his bike, flattening one of the tires. In no time at all, Mrs. Renkins fixes his bike. After the Man buys him a George-sized bike, Bill entrusts him with a paper route which goes well, until George sees several ducks in a pond and wants to make paper boats like that time he went to the pond with The Man.
27	27	"The All Animal Recycled Band"	Scott Heming	Cusi Cram	Zhenia Delioussine	February 20, 2007	124b
27	27	"The Times of Sand"	Frank Marino	Joe Fallon	Robert Sledge	February 20, 2007	120b
"The All Animal Recycled Band": The Man with the Yellow Hat has a hobby playing the tuba in Rescue Squad 86's firehouse band. George becomes excited at the thought of a band, but the Man will not let George play his tuba. George then decides to make his own instruments and that his animal friends will be the ones playing them. The only problem is that his animal friends seem to get distracted too easily and, after causing a loud racket on the roof of the apartment building where they are practicing, someone calls the fire department. "The Times of Sand": George loves the country house, but sometimes he wishes he could live in something else, like a country castle. When The Man offers to take him to the beach to build sand castles, George decides to try to build the world's biggest sand castle. At the beach, they run into Bill and Mother Rabbit who loves to burrow. George has trouble building his sand castle because the sand does not want to hold together. Later, Bill tells him that only the wet sand down by the water is good for building. George tries building by the water but his sand winds up being washed away by the tide. Later, The Man tells George how to get good wet sand away from the water and he along with George, Bill, and Ma Rabbit work on the world's biggest sand castle.
28	28	"The Elephant Upstairs"	Scott Heming	Sandra Willard	Cathy Malkasian	February 21, 2007	126a
28	28	"Being Hundley"	Dean Criswell	Ken Scarborough and Joe Fallon	Christo Stamboliev	February 21, 2007	127a
"The Elephant Upstairs" George has been hearing some strange noises from the neighbor's apartment upstairs. He figures that The Man with the Yellow Hat lives with him, but The Man is determined not to let George spy on the new neighbor to find out. George guesses that with a loud noise like the one he is hearing, the new neighbor has an elephant. George then hears some different noises. George tries to convince The Man to believe that an elephant is living upstairs. "Being Hundley": George has been getting a little tired of The Man With the Yellow Hat telling him what to do and decides that he will live his life like Compass the Pigeon, but soon finds out that the differences between monkeys and pigeons are too great for them to act like one another. George decides to act like a creature more like him. Acting like Gnocchi, the cat doesn't work for him because he can't lick himself clean with getting a furry mouth. Then George finally decides, he would like to be just like Hundley because it looks easy being a lobby dog. But when the elevator breaks down with him, Hundley and the Doorman stuck inside, George discovers that when it comes to being a monkey, things come to him naturally.
29	29	"George Fixes Betsy's Wagon"	Dean Criswell	Ken Scarborough and Joe Fallon	Monica Tomova	February 22, 2007	128a
29	29	"Curious George Takes a Dive"	Dean Criswell	Raye Lankford	Pablo Solis	February 22, 2007	124a
"George Fixes Betsy's Wagon": George has to take a pile of stuff down to the recycling center. He comes upon Steve who is holding Betsy's wagon. He has a package for Betsy that he is picking up from the package delivery right next door to the Recycling Center. George places all of his stuff in the wagon but, after an accident, one of the wagon's wheels pops off and Steve later winds up sending it rolling off on its own. With the wheel lost, Steve and George must find a new one that is the same size as all the others because, if one is used of the wrong size, the wagon does not travel straight. "Curious George Takes a Dive": George is helping The Man with the Yellow Hat dig in the country garden when he finds a pile of worms and wants to keep them. The Man tells George about a similar experience with a turtle from back when George first learned how to dive in the lake. George remembers how Bill had first taught him how to dive in Lake Wanasinklake to locate a lost throwing disc. George finds a turtle trying to go into the lake and tries to remind it that it needs to hold its breath when it goes in. After it does not listen, George decides that is trying to clean itself, so he takes it home to give it a bath and decides to keep it as a pet, but it seems like whatever George does, he can't get the turtle out of its shell.
30	30	"Unbalanced"	Dean Criswell	Grant Moran	Andrei Svislotski	February 23, 2007	115a
30	30	"Curious George vs. Winter"	Scott Heming	Joe Fallon	Llyn Hunter	February 23, 2007	123a
"Unbalanced": It has just become Springtime in the city and Chef Pisghetti's friends the Balancing Zucchinis are in town. George is excited seeing what they do and he would like to become a Zucchini, but his trying to be like them messes up their practicing for the big show. Later on during the show, The Zucchinis volunteer Chef Pisghetti to be in an act of theirs, but Gnocchi, always going to the chef whenever she sees him, starts walking across a tightrope to their act upsetting one of the Zucchini's who is allergic to cats. It is up to George to walk across the tight rope and retrieve Gnocchi. "Curious George vs. Winter": It is early winter in the country and George wants to play outside. The problem is he has toys for summer and snow but no toys for just plain cold. He decides he will have fun by playing with Bill's bunnies but Bill is taking them to his grandmother's house for the entire winter. Bill wants him to leave out nuts and seeds for Jumpy Squirrel all winter and George wants to find a way to have fun in the winter cold. Later, after he sees how the water in his pool is frozen, he finds a way to have fun outdoors and give Jumpy the food he needs.

=== Season 2 (2007–08) ===
No. overall	No. in season	Title	Directed by	Written by	Storyboard by	Original release date	Prod. code
31	1	"Up, Up and Away"	Scott Heming	Chuck Tately	Llyn Hunter	September 3, 2007	201
31	1	"Skunked"	Scott Heming	Joe Fallon	Eric McConnell	September 3, 2007	201
"Up, Up and Away": George arrives in the country for some of the Renkins' fresh blueberries but soon finds out something else: Mrs. Renkins is setting up a hot air balloon. She offers to take George and the Man up and down a few times. Soon, Bill shows up and he and George accidentally send the balloon skyward an untether it. George and Bill are then left soaring across the country sky and have no clue how to stop and land. "Skunked": George is in the country eating a sandwich when he sees a strange-looking animal stealing his food. After trying to scare it away he winds up getting sprayed with a stinky fluid. The Man tells George that the animal he met was a skunk and that they spray to defend themselves. Bill finds the skunk to be living under his front porch and seals up its home. That leaves the skunk to nestle in the basket George and the Man brought to the country and they wind up accidentally bringing it home to the city. The skunk gets loose in George's apartment building, and chaos unfolds when George, Hundley, The Man, and the Doorman try to catch it without scaring it.
32	2	"Monkey Underground"	Scott Heming	Lazar Saric	Curtis Cim	September 4, 2007	202
32	2	"Cat Mother"	Frank Molieri	Lazar Saric	Adam Henry	September 4, 2007	202
"Monkey Underground": The Renkins' are having a problem with their grape yard. A group of gophers have made their home in the ground under the garden and are stealing the grapes. Upset with the problem, Mr. Renkins calls Calhoun the Gopher-getter, an exterminator, to come and catch the gophers. George does not like the idea of somebody catching the innocent gophers, even if he does plan to release them again and decides to build a connecting tunnel between his house and the Renkins' garden so the gophers can escape. "Cat Mother": George has another job in the city. He has to take care of Professor Wiseman's new kitten, Lucky for a day. Lucky appears to have a crush on Hundley, which is unfortunate because Hundley is allergic to cats. When the Doorman tells George to keep Lucky away, he decides to build a version of Hundley which will not make Lucky sneeze. When things do not work out, George annoys Hundley by using one of Hundley's items. When Lucky hears Hundley barking through the air vent, she goes inside the walls of the apartment to try to find him.
33	3	"Up a Tree"	Jeff McGrath	Joe Fallon	Max Martinez	September 5, 2007	203
33	3	"Curious George and the Trash"	Scott Heming	Joe Fallon	Kathy Carr	September 5, 2007	203
"Up a Tree": Frustrated with The Man's house rules - such as no drawing on the walls and no using feet to butter corn - George decides to build a tree house where he can make his own house rules, but when Mrs. Renkins and Mr. Quint tell him he can use any of their materials, he winds up stealing a wall from Mrs. Renkins' chicken coop and nails from Mr. Quint's dock. "Curious George and the Trash": The Man is trying to get ready for his photo on his new licence but when George tries to help, the ensuing chaos ruins the Man's hat. The hat is cleaned and restored like new and the Man puts it on the kitchen counter right next to an identical looking box of trash. In a rush, George accidentally throws out the box with the hat and must go on a city-wide spree to find it, but it seems like every trash can and dumpster in the city George finds has already been emptied by the garbage truck. George finds some disposed items at Pisghetti's restaurant but Chef Pisghetti tells him that it is not trash, it is recycling. He tells George to go look for the hat in the landfill.
34	4	"Curious George Gets All Keyed Up"	Frank Molieri	Raye Lankford	Frank Marino	September 6, 2007	204
34	4	"Gutter Monkey"	Frank Molieri	Raye Lankford	Christo Stamboliev	September 6, 2007	204
"Curious George Gets All Keyed Up": Betsy has to play her xylophone in the school recital but she has to get her hair dressed and does not want to take her xylophone to the hairdresser. She entrusts George and Steve to get the xylophone to the school, but when George knocks the xylophone over he must put it back together. He remembers how the notes, when played in order, sound like they are climbing stairs, but it seems like no matter how he sets up the bars, he can't get them in order. He realizes he needs to count in order from one to set up the xylophone properly, but George cannot count past 12 and the xylophone has more pieces than that. "Gutter Monkey": The Man is competing in the country town bowling tournament at Bowlmore Lanes but it seems like George does not have any luck getting the ball to hit the pins because it keeps falling into the gutter. When he sees The Man polishing his bowling shoes because they make it extra lucky, George decides to polish his bowling ball too. After George polishes the ball he decides to give it a test roll. However, the yard is bumpy and the driveway is a hill so he just cannot get the ball to roll straight. That is until he keeps the ball so long that The Man forgets it and George sees the road from the country house to the Bowling Alley is like a big bowling lane with gutters.
35	5	"Grease Monkeys in Space"	Scott Heming	Joe Fallon	Rafael Rosado	October 8, 2007	205
35	5	"Piñata Vision"	Frank Molieri and Cathy Malkasian	Michael Maurer	Neal Sternecky	October 8, 2007	205
"Grease Monkeys in Space": The Man With the Yellow Hat is about to get a big job. He is going to go up into space to fix the Einstein-Pizza Space Telescope, which is broken and pointed right at Pizza's kitchen window. Dr. Einstein and Professor Pizza explain that the spaceship has a self-locking air lock but they accidentally forgot to make a way to open it from outside. George has to tag along to push the button that would let him in but is forced to go outside and do the job when the Man's tether breaks. Worse off, George is told he has only 2 minutes of air to complete the job. "Piñata Vision": George is at Betsy's birthday party and sees that they have something he has never seen before: a piñata. After George is told how to play, he goes on a free-swinging spree and winds up breaking everything in the backyard but the piñata. Aunt Margret tells George to stay outside and play with Charkie and asks him to put his blindfold on and follow her around the backyard with his other senses. Charkie soon escapes the backyard and a blind George begins to follow her around the city in a way other than seeing her.
36	6	"All-New Hundley"	Scott Heming	Chuck Tately	Bert Ring	October 9, 2007	206
36	6	"Signs Up"	Frank Molieri and Cathy Malkasian	Chuck Tately	Charles Visser	October 9, 2007	206
"All-New Hundley": George is unhappy with Hundley, who will simply not let him play in the lobby. He wishes that Hundley would be more fun. However, one day, he notices that Hundley is barking loudly and acting bouncy and playful, much to his wish. George then notices that Hundley seems to go back and forth between acting bouncy and playful, and acting like his normal self. Realizing that something is not normal about Hundley's split personality, George tries to figure out what is going on. He later discovers that Hundley actually is acting like his normal self and that his bouncy, playful self is actually a hyperactive dachsund that looks like him named Doxie, who belongs to the Doorman's sister. "Signs Up": George and The Man run into Steve at the local movie theater taking down signs for the old movies, which the manager lets him have. Steve tells George that he collects all of the posters which makes George want a collection of his own of sorts. When he sees a construction worker taking down a sign, he decides to collect various signs from around the city. He takes every sign from the park, zoo, and museum. When he goes back out to look for more, he notices the park in chaos. Realizing that it is because the signs are gone, he decides to put them back, but puts them in the wrong places causing more chaos. The Man and Professor Wiseman tell George that each sign has a meaning and they are not just for decoration.
37	7	"Color Me Monkey"	Scott Heming	Cusi Cram	Max Martinez	October 10, 2007	207
37	7	"Special Delivery Monkey"	Frank Molieri and Cathy Malkasian	Raye Lankford	Bob Nesler	October 10, 2007	207
"Color Me Monkey": Mr. Glass is looking for something unique for the lobby of his Glass Palace. Mr. Zoobel, George's upstairs neighbor tells Mr. Glass that he knows of a painter named Soo Berm who lives at the zoo. It turns out that Soo Berm is not a person, but she is an elephant. She makes paintings with her trunk and gives them her signature trunk print when she is done. Mr. Glass buys one of her paintings and brings it back to the Glass Palace but Charkie accidentally rips it. George has to get a replacement painting but it turns out that every painting Soo Berm makes is unique and one-of-a-kind. This leaves George to make his own copy of the painting. The only problem is that the painting has colors like green and lavender and all George has are red, white, blue, yellow, and black. "Special Delivery Monkey": George and The Man are playing George's favorite game after an afternoon lunch at Pisghetti's, but George seems to be confused with how to count. The Man keeps reminding him that when you count, you don't count from where you start and you must count on. Meanwhile, Chef Pisghetti has gone off for a special presentation but has forgotten his pie. Netti assigns George to deliver it to him, giving him specific directions how to get to him. George however forgets what The Man tells him and gets lost, getting off on bus stop earlier than when he was supposed to and not being able to find the building where the chef is located.
38	8	"Free Hundley"	Frank Molierl and Cathy Malkasian	Cate Liewen	Zhenia Delioussine	November 19, 2007	208
38	8	"Bag Monkey"	Scott Heming	Ron Holsey	Larry Latham	November 19, 2007	208
"Free Hundley": Hundley is very itchy. It is the middle of flea season in the big city and the Doorman goes to give him a bath. After Hundley's collar winds up getting lost down a storm sewer, two women from the local animal shelter think he's homeless and take him away. George must find a way to break Hundley out of the animal shelter. He brings along Gnocchi, whose cuteness would make a great distraction and Charkie, who could probably figure out how to open the cage being the escape artist she is. George must also figure out a plan to sneak in, free Hundley, and sneak out. "Bag Monkey": George's room is getting very messy and George needs to clean it. The only problem is that when George crams everything into his closet, it just spills back out. Later on at the local supermarket, he sees the grocer's son practicing for a grocery bagging competition. He explains to George that a lot of stuff can fit into one small bag if it is put in just right, somewhat like putting together a puzzle. However, during another practice run, the grocer's son accidentally hurts his hand with one of the food items. He then enlists George to compete for him in the competition and must train him to bag properly.
39	9	"Monkey Stagehand"	Scott Heming	Chuck Tately	Llyn Hunter	November 20, 2007	209
39	9	"The Magic Garden"	Cathy Malkasian	Joe Fallon	Cathy Malkasian	November 20, 2007	209
"Monkey Stagehand": It is time for the annual country talent show. After hearing the Man with the Yellow Hat's frog impressions, Bill decides to sign him up, but the problem is that The Man has stage fright. Bill also shows George the system of ropes and pulleys that control the flat scenery as well as he curtain on stage. He also shows George the trap doors on the stage used to drop props below the stage. When Bill, The Man, and Mr. Quint come face-to-face with two skunks backstage, it is up to George to keep the show going. "The Magic Garden": The Pisghetti's have a problem, as they do not have as many fresh vegetables for their dishes. When they decide to investigate why, they show George and The Man their rooftop garden, where they plant and grow all of their vegetables, on the roof of their restaurant's building. Chef Pisghetti discovers weeds growing in the garden and explains to George how they use of all of the nutrients in the soil so there is none left for their vegetables. After hearing the story of "The Elves & the Shoemaker," George decides to do some secret elf work of his own and weed the garden, but in the process he pulls everything green out of the garden and throws it away, including the vegetables. Luckily the chef has seeds, but George has the fully-grown vegetables at home and is willing to bury them.
40	10	"Curious George, Plumber's Helper"	Cathy Malkasian	Joe Fallon	Spike Brandt	November 21, 2007	210
40	10	"Curious George Takes a Hike"	Scott Heming	Chuck Tately	Byron Vaughns	November 21, 2007	210
"Curious George, Plumber's Helper": George grows tired of the same old tub toys. But when he tries some new toys in the tub and drains it afterwards, all of the toys get washed down the drain. After trying to fill the tub with water again it backs up. The Man decides to call his plumber who always fascinates George with his work. The plumber fixes the clog and leaves, and the Man also leaves, to buy George some new bath toys. Afterwards, George is faced with another clog, this time in the dishwasher and decides to fix it himself, dismantling not only the plumbing in the apartment but also in the basement. After turning the plumbing back on, George winds up flooding portions of the apartment building. "Curious George Takes a Hike": When Bill and The Man With the Yellow Hat are stuck on a cliff, George has to find his way back to the ranger station.
41	11	"The Fully Automatic Monkey Fun Hat"	Scott Heming	Joe Fallon	Rafael Rosado	November 22, 2007	211
41	11	"Creatures of the Night"	Cathy Malkasian	Chuck Tately	Zhenia Delioussine	November 22, 2007	211
"The Fully Automatic Monkey Fun Hat": George tries to find a hat that is as much fun as the Yellow Hat, and ends up creating a hat with blow up animals, frisbees, pictures of dachshunds, a rotating fish, bubble blower, and a raisin dispenser. The Man accidentally wears it to a convention and George has to deliver the yellow hat. "Creatures of the Night": When Bill tells George it was an opossum that ate the bird food from the bird feeder, George stays up to see what a possum looks like. Then he notices that it has lost its family, so he looks and finds it. Along the way he meets more nocturnal animals and makes almost everyone in the country think he is "The Lake Creature of Lake Wannasink Lake".
42	12	"Scaredy Dog"	Cathy Malkasian	Lazar Saric	Christo Stamboliev	January 21, 2008	212
42	12	"Say Goodnight, George"	Scott Heming	Ron Holsey	Curtis Cim	January 21, 2008	212
"Scaredy Dog": A spooky noise in the basement scares Hundley and George until George investigates it. "Say Goodnight, George": When spring comes, George is disappointed that he has to go to bed when the sun is still out because in spring, the days are longer than the winter which has shorter days, he sets the clock back. When that causes him to miss a blimp ride, he thinks otherwise.
43	13	"A Bridge Too Farm"	Scott Heming	Joe Fallon	Neal Sternecky	January 22, 2008	213
43	13	"Monkey Fever"	Scott Heming	Craig Miller	Larry Latham	January 22, 2008	213
"A Bridge Too Farm": The Renkins' chicks get stranded on a tiny island and George has to improvise a way for them to get to land, using some items he picked up for a cookout. "Monkey Fever": The Man with the Yellow Hat has come down with a cold and George is helping to take care of him. That is until George realizes the man is showing the same symptoms as Betsy's friend's pregnant cat.
44	14	"Curious George, Spy Monkey"	Cathy Malkasian and Jeff McGrath	Raye Lankford	Bob Nesler	January 23, 2008	214
44	14	"Castle Keep"	Cathy Malkasian	Raye Lankford	Stephen Sandoval	January 23, 2008	214
"Curious George, Spy Monkey": When The Man goes to buy George a toy, George spies on him to find out what it is with that in case keeping a hyper Charkie from ruining his stakeout. "Castle Keep": George and The Man go to Scotland to visit Uncle Tam and work on their golf swings. When a squirrel (a Scotland version of Jumpy Squirrel) steals George's golf ball mistaking it for a nut, he has to pry open windows, move bookcases, and work a drawbridge to get it back from the nut-eating thief.
45	15	"Robot Monkey Hullabaloo"	Scott Heming	Joe Fallon	Rafael Rosado	January 24, 2008	215
45	15	"Curious George and the Slithery Day"	Scott Heming	Bruce Akiyama	Llyn Hunter	January 24, 2008	215
"Robot Monkey Hullabaloo": When George dresses up as robot everyone thinks he's a real robot. "Curious George and the Slithery Day": When a snake and two mice get loose in George's apartment building, George has to find them, but things get crazy when Hundley gets involved in the chase.
46	16	"Curious George, Web Master"	Cathy Malkasian	Bruce Akiyama	Kelly James	February 18, 2008	216
46	16	"The Big Sleepy"	Cathy Malkasian	Craig Miller	Frank Marino	February 18, 2008	216
"Curious George, Web Master": George is impressed by a spider's web and wants to build his own "monkeyweb". "The Big Sleepy": When George gets cold during the Winter he tries to hibernate but he keeps getting disturbed and wakes up.
47	17	"Curious George Sinks the Pirates"	Jeff McGrath	Joe Fallon	Curtis Cim	February 19, 2008	217
47	17	"This Little Piggy"	Cathy Malkasian	Michael Maurer	Zhenia Delioussine	February 19, 2008	217
"Curious George Sinks the Pirates": Whilst sleeping, Hundley dreams that he is captain of an old sailing ship, which includes George as part of the crew. They are attacked by Yellow Hat the Pirate and Captain Hundley is imprisoned, until George comes to the rescue. "This Little Piggy": George gets a piggy bank and uses it to save money for a toy boat, by doing extra jobs around the house and helping in a local Italian restaurant. He is faced with a dilemma though, when he realises he will have to smash the piggy bank to get to his savings.
48	18	"King Doggie"	Scott Heming	Chuck Tately	Stephen Sandoval	February 20, 2008	218
48	18	"The Lucky Cap"	Cathy Malkasian	Ron Holsey	N/A	February 20, 2008	218
"King Doggie": Hundley is mistaken for a lost aristocratic doggie, and George must prove he isn't the right dog. "The Lucky Cap": George becomes fixated on a "lucky cap"; when the Man shrinks it in the wash, he is concerned that he won't be able to meet Steve's hopscotch challenge.
49	19	"Curious George, Sea Monkey"	Cathy Malkasian	Bruce Akiyama	Rafael Rosado	April 21, 2008	219
49	19	"Old McGeorgie Had a Farm"	Scott Heming	Michael Maurer	Larry Latham	April 21, 2008	219
"Curious George, Sea Monkey": George and The Man With the Yellow Hat travel on a boat with Professor Wiseman as well as Professor Pizza and Professor Einstein to retrieve a weather satellite that has fallen from space into the ocean. The only problem is that the satellite has fallen into the middle of a coral reef which is very brittle, so George dives down to retrieve it himself. "Old McGeorgie Had a Farm": Mr. Renkins is going with his pig, Oscar to a contest and has nobody to watch the farm in his absence. George and The Man With The Yellow Hat volunteer, but after George accidentally deactivates the Man's alarm clock, he has to take care of the farm himself and he learns just how hard farm work really is.
50	20	"Curious George Beats the Band"	Jeff McGrath	Joe Fallon; Story by : Craig Miller	Llyn Hunter	April 22, 2008	220
50	20	"Hats and a Hole"	Cathy Malkasian	Holly Huckins	Bob Nesler	April 22, 2008	220
"Curious George Beats the Band": George wins a contest to be a conductor in the symphony orchestra when they perform in the park. He is taught how to read music and conduct an orchestra and is ready to conduct in the park until Charkie mistakes his baton for her toy. "Hats and a Hole": The Man With The Yellow Hat is digging a deep hole in the front yard of the country house. He winds up digging a hole so deep, he needs the help of Mr. Quint and his brother Flint's ladder to dig it out. After the 3 go to the train station with the ladder to fix something, George drops their hard hats down the hole.

=== Season 3 (2008–09) ===
No. overall	No. in season	Title	Directed by	Written by	Storyboard by	Original release date	Prod. code
51	1	"Ice Station Monkey"	Scott Heming	Bruce Akiyama	Rafael Rosado	September 1, 2008	301
51	1	"The Perfect Carrot"	Jeff McGrath	Joe Fallon	Curtis Cim	September 1, 2008	301
"Ice Station Monkey": The Man With The Yellow Hat and George go to Antarctica to observe the habits of chinstrap penguin when a snowstorm traps them away from their base. "The Perfect Carrot": In the country, George tends to a carrot patch and grows a gigantic and "perfect" carrot, but when Bill's bunnies have escaped, he may have to give up his perfect carrot to help them.
52	2	"Curious George Meets The Press"	Scott Heming	Chuck Tately	Spike Brandt	September 2, 2008	302
52	2	"Snow Use"	Jeff McGrath	Bruce Akiyama	Bob Nesler	September 2, 2008	302
"Curious George Meets The Press": In the country, George and the Man are helping to harvest the Renkins' apples, but when Jumpy finds an apple he thinks is "Perfect" George tries to hide it and winds up making apple cider with Mr. Renkins' apple press. "Snow Use": George wants to build a snowman but it is the middle of summer, so he tries alternatives like a mudman and a sandman.
53	3	"For the Birds"	Scott Heming	Joe Fallon	Ken Kessel	September 3, 2008	303
53	3	"Curious George-asaurus"	Scott Heming	Craig Miller	Larry Latham	September 3, 2008	303
"For the Birds": George tries to fill the bird feeder outside of the country house to draw birds but Jumpy keeps eating the seeds he fills the feeder with. "Curious George-asaurus": When George tries to get his toy plane from the top of the museum's new dinosaur skeleton, he accidentally wrecks it and must put it back together before an important scientist comes to see it.
54	4	"Mulch Ado About Nothing"	Scott Heming	Sandra Willard	Zhenia Delioussine	September 4, 2008	304
54	4	"What Goes Up"	Cathy Malkasian	Bill Burnett	Neal Sternecky	September 4, 2008	304
"Mulch Ado About Nothing": In the country, Mr Renkins tells George about compost and how it helps plants grow. Then, upon returning to the city, George sees that the apartment plants could use a little and decides to make compost right in the apartment. "What Goes Up": It is Reuse Your Junk Day in the country, where residents take and old stuff and find new uses for it. Mr. Renkins has a bunch of old stuff in his living room, but it is too big and heavy for George to move on his own, so he decides to launch it outside by using a lever.
55	5	"The Amazing Maze Race"	Jeff McGrath	Chuck Tately	Pablo Solis	October 13, 2008	305
55	5	"The Color of Monkey"	Cathy Malkasian	Michael Maurer	Rafael Rosado and Bob Nesler	October 13, 2008	305
"The Amazing Maze Race": It is the day of the annual Great Corn Maze Race in the country and George and The Man are among the teams competing in the race. While the others insist on using their own methods of navigating through the maze, George and The Man stick to using a map. This episode is very similar to The Amazing Race. "The Color of Monkey": The Man With The Yellow Hat and his friends are going bird watching. To keep George clean for a magazine picture, he insists George stay behind at Chef Pisghetti's Restaurant and color eggs, but when an accident causes George to fall into the dye, he becomes dyed yellow.
56	6	"Man with the Monkey Hands"	Scott Heming	Joe Fallon	Curtis Cim	November 28, 2008	306
56	6	"Whistlepig Wednesday"	Cathy Malkasian	Joe Fallon	Llyn Hunter	November 28, 2008	306
"Man with the Monkey Hands": The Man with the Yellow Hat has an allergic reaction to Poison Ivy while playing with George, making his hands unusable for three weeks. During that time, George attaches various utensils to the man's hands to help him do things until they heal. When the man discovers that he has to do a video conference rather than simply a conference call with important scientists who wish to patent Professor Wiseman's new invention, George uses his hands to demonstrate the invention. "Whistlepig Wednesday": A holiday created by Mr. Glass known as Whistlepig Wednesday is approaching. On that day, Mr. Glass's whistlepig (the locals word for a Groundhog) comes up to see her shadow. If she sees it, it means the start of the winter season. Trying to figure out how a shadow could affect the weather, George goes to watch the Whistlepig, but he gets there early and falls asleep, causing Mr. Glass to mistake George's shadow with that of the Whistlepig.
57	7	"George Digs Worms"	Scott Heming	Michael Maurer	Spike Brandt	December 1, 2008	307
57	7	"Everything Old Is New Again"	Scott Heming	Sandra Willard	Larry Latham	December 1, 2008	307
"George Digs Worms": Bill tells George about the popular new sport of worm racing so George decides to dig up a few worms to use in the races. However, George has trouble finding a place to keeps them for that time until The Man With The Yellow Hat helps him build a worm farm. "Everything Old Is New Again": The city is holding a contest for each of the apartment buildings in the city for who can collect the most recycling. After learning about recycling during a visit to the recycling center, George is determined to make his building win the contest, but when everyone forgets to explain to him that he can only recycle something after he uses it, George unintentionally resorts to cheating by stealing half of a woman's grocery delivery, all of the newspapers by everyone's doors, paint pails from a painter, and all of the pizza coupons in the lobby. Even worse, George ends up wasting food and other products by emptying their containers into other food containers, leading to The Man inadvertently making himself a disgusting breakfast. Meanwhile, George's neighbors accuse the Doorman of stealing their belongings to win the contest, until The Man shows up with George and lectures him about recycling things after using them.
58	8	"Wheels on the Bus"	Jeff McGrath	Bill Burnett	Rafael Rosado	February 16, 2009	308
58	8	"Seed Trouble"	Jeff McGrath	Chuck Tately	Neal Sternecky	February 16, 2009	308
"Wheels on the Bus": The Man With The Yellow Hat is running late to an appointment to show an important scientist some of his work, so he and George decide to take the bus to his appointment. When George wanders off of the bus to get a map of the bus routes and the Man follows, leaving his work on the bus, they both wind up splitting up and each trying to find a way to find the bus and retrieve his work all while trying to arrive at his appointment on time. "Seed Trouble": George and The Man decide to plant their own rooftop garden as an extension to Chef Pisghetti's rooftop garden. But after he puts all of the seeds into a jar to hide them from the Doorman's seed-stealing pigeons, he has to find a way to sort them back out and find out which seeds will grow into what.
59	9	"Fun-Ball Tally"	Scott Heming	Bruce Akiyama	Bob Nesler	February 17, 2009	309
59	9	"Red Sky at Night, Monkey's Delight"	Cathy Malkasian	Chuck Tately	Rafael Rosado	February 17, 2009	309
"Fun-Ball Tally": The toy store introduces a new toy called the Super Fun-Ball and a contest. Whoever can guess how many Fun-balls are in a display case closest to the actual number will win the display. George finds a container of about the same size as the display case and fills it with marbles about the same size as the fun balls. Doing so, George hopes he can win the contest. "Red Sky at Night, Monkey's Delight": After George hears the legend that a red sunset means a day of good weather and sees The Man With The Yellow Hat painting a red sunset picture, George decides to draw pictures of the clouds and watch their movement to predict the weather. He soon also learns that other animals have way of predicting the weather, such as the speed of a cricket chirping. Soon, he learns how people predict the weather.
60	10	"Shipwrecked With Hundley"	Cathy Malkasian	Craig Miller	Zhenia Delioussine	February 18, 2009	310
60	10	"Chasing Rainbows"	Jeff McGrath	Michael Maurer	Pablo Solis	February 18, 2009	310
"Shipwrecked With Hundley": George, The Man, The Doorman and Hundley go out to sea for a day on the Doorman's boat. A crack appears in the mast though, so they land on a deserted tropical island to patch up the damage. The two men go to search for vines, leaving George and Hundley with the boat. George decides the anchor should be back in the boat, causing them to drift out to sea. They find their way back to the opposite side of the island and find the two men, who have been trying to build a raft. "Chasing Rainbows": The Man with the Yellow Hat takes George, Steve, Betsy and Charkie on a trip to the country. George sees a rainbow and a pot of gold in one of Betsy's books and when a real rainbow appears when they are out on a walk, George sets off to try and find the end of the rainbow.
61	11	"Night of the Weiner Dog"	Scott Heming	Michael Maurer	Andrei Svislotski	April 22, 2009	313 (AA415)
61	11	"Animal Trackers"	Jeff McGrath	Bruce Akiyama	Larry Latham	April 22, 2009	313 (AA415)
"Night of the Weiner Dog": George has a sleepover with Hundley for the night and the Doorman has made a list of instructions for how Hundley normally likes everything. George has to follow the list and rearrange some of the apartment's furniture to make him feel more at home. "Animal Trackers": It's Nature Week and George is taking pictures for a big exhibit, and when looking for a fawn that Bill saw, he sees other ordinary animals such as raccoons, squirrels, and bullfrogs, but he also sees footprints that look like they are a cross between a colossal snake and a duck. He thinks that there is a duck-billed dinosaur on the loose so he decides to lure it by using fruits and vegetables, and he finds new things and clues along the way. The footprints turned out to be made from something far different from a dinosaur.

=== Season 4 (2009–10) ===
No. overall	No. in season	Title	Directed by	Written by	Storyboard by	Original release date	Prod. code
62	1	"Curious George, Personal Trainer"	Cathy Malkasian	John Loy	Frank Marino	September 8, 2009	401 (AA422/AA421)
62	1	"Sprout Outing"	Scott Heming	Bill Burnett	Charles Grosvenor	September 8, 2009	401 (AA422/AA421)
"Curious George, Personal Trainer": Curious George and the Man persuade Professor Wiseman to start working out instead of working in the museum all day. The Man signs himself and her up for a marathon to support a trip to Oman. Although she doesn't want to, the professor has 'anonymous donors' forcing her to run in the marathon. On her first day training with George, she gets tired and has to take a cab home. The Man offers to train her, but later breaks his ankle tripping, and George has to step in as personal trainer. He watches a TV show about getting fit and takes notes, and the next day he runs with Professor Wiseman, but she doesn't think running was fun, so George took her to a park carnival, where they rode the Ferris wheel, watched a puppet show and grabbed balloons. On the day of the marathon, everything went well, with George and the Man (on crutches) cheering her on, but then she wanted George to run with her to the finish. Afterwards she gave George her medal. "Sprout Outing": George, Vicky, Vinni, and Bill go Sprout Outing with the Man. Somehow they get lost, and then George finds a man named Dr. Greenbean cutting down branches of a tree, which George is not happy about.
63	2	"Gnocchi The Critic"	Scott Heming	Sandra Willard	Spike Brandt	September 9, 2009	311 (AA414/AA413)
63	2	"George Cleans Up"	Jeff McGrath	Lazar Saric	Llyn Hunter	September 9, 2009	311 (AA414/AA413)
"Gnocchi The Critic": Chef Pisghetti has a problem. For the past few days, Gnocchi, who normally loves her food, has not been eating it. She'd rather eat the flowers which the chef has been having delivered to the restaurant for the past few days. With someone who no longer likes his food around, Chef Pisghetti decides to close the restaurant. When The Man discovers he has an allergy to the delivered flowers decorating the restaurant, and that allergies can reduce the ability to taste, they believe that maybe Gnocchi has an allergy to flowers. "George Cleans Up": When The Man discovers how messy the apartment has become, he decides it is time for George to learn how to use the vacuum cleaner. When the same vacuum The Man uses is too big for George, he buys a vacuum his size and teaches him how to use it, but after George cleans the apartment but wishes to continue cleaning, he goes out on a city-wide cleaning spree and uses his vacuum to suck up anything he finds left lying around, much to the annoyance of people he thinks he's helping.
64	3	"George Meets Allie-Whoops"	Cathy Malkasian	Kathy Waugh	Andrei Svislotski	October 12, 2009	403 (AA426/AA425)
64	3	"Hundley's Great Escape"	Scott Heming	Raye Lankford	Pablo Solis	October 12, 2009	403 (AA426/AA425)
"George Meets Allie-Whoops": George meets Mrs. Renkins' 5-year-old granddaughter Allie for the first time. Being human, Allie does not know much about monkey life. That is until George shows her a day in the life of a monkey including a lesson in climbing trees, but Allie climbs so high up a tree when chasing Jumpy that she winds up stuck and George needs to find a way to get her down. "Hundley's Great Escape": When Hundley tries to return a toy to a baby, George winds up thinking he wants to play. Then, George, Hundley, and Gnocchi wind up locked in Chef Pisghetti's basement with nobody there to set them free. There is, however, a window high up. George tries to use various items in the basement to build a ramp to allow them all to escape.
65	4	"Juicy George"	Cathy Malkasian	Lazar Saric	Dave Williams	November 23, 2009	402b (AA424)
65	4	"The Big Picture"	Scott Heming	Peter Bakalian	Rick Wilke	November 23, 2009	402a (AA423)
"Juicy George": At a farmer's market, George and The Man run into Juicy Jay, a man who uses his special juicer to make juices which are delicious, using only fruit. The Man and George decide to buy his juicer for themselves but the Man has no clue how to use it. When the Man goes out to help Professor Wiseman, George figures out how to use the juicer but must now figure out Juicy Jay's recipe for their favorite juice of his. "The Big Picture": George's favorite bird the Cerulean Warbler is on the endangered list, but The Man has written a new book to increase public awareness about the bird. Only problem is, the book is not selling. That is until George runs into Steve and his lemonade stand and Steve tells him how to advertise a product, after which George finds a blank billboard and decides to paint a picture to promote The Man's new book.
66	5	"The Inside Story"	Jeff McGrath	Peter K. Hirsch	Frank Marino	December 14, 2009	404 (AA429/AA427)
66	5	"Little Fish, Littler Pond" "A Monkey, A Plan, and a Canal"	Scott Heming	Chuck Tately	Curtis Cim	December 14, 2009	404 (AA429/AA427)
"The Inside Story": It is sauce day at Chef Pisghetti's. George eats the spaghetti but after putting salt in the sauce he catches a cold and is taken home, where he has a dream that he and Gnocchi visits his own body while his body is asleep and battles with a blues singing germ named Toots. "Little Fish, Littler Pond" (AKA "A Monkey, A Plan, and a Canal"): George goes with Allie to the pond and lake. They find a little fish separated from its family. George himself has to get the fish on the other side and to its family, so he builds a canal.
67	6	"Guest Monkey"	Scott Heming	Kathy Waugh	Andrei Svislotski	February 15, 2010	405 (AA430/AA428)
67	6	"Charkie Goes to School"	Jeff McGrath	Chuck Tately	Zhenia Delioussine	February 15, 2010	405 (AA430/AA428)
"Guest Monkey": George is excited to some day go to school, so Allie decides that he should visit her kindergarten class for a day. But, as it turns out, there are lots of rules about what is or not allowed and George is a bad follower (he made a mess when he tried to show his climbing and swinging skills, he stood on the sand table, and pulled the plug on the water table). The things change when George and Allie decide to build a castle in the classroom based on a book they read. "Charkie Goes to School": Charkie is at a dog obedience class, and the next day is the final test. Since Betsy has a concert, George (and Hundley, who is one of the dog obedience class' best students) must recreate the obstacle course and make sure Charkie can do it in under a minute to pass.
68	7	"Relax!"	Scott Heming	Ron Holsey	Ken Kessel	February 16, 2010	312 (AA411/AA412)
68	7	"The Box and the Hound"	Scott Heming	Bruce Akiyama	Curtis Cim	February 16, 2010	312 (AA411/AA412)
"Relax!": George and The Man find out Professor Wiseman has a busy day and get confused of everything. Then they make a suggestion to relax. They go and feed the ducks and have a picnic, but the Professor solves all the problems and The Man says to stop meaning to relax the whole time. "The Box and the Hound": Steve and Betsy's Aunt has a new package that is supposed to be delivered. When it arrives, she tells George to keep it safe from Charkie, because the package is fragile, or easy to break. When Charkie can't seem to stay away from the box, George gets the idea to disguise the box as something else.
69	8	"George Measures Up"	Scott Heming	Bill Burnett	Bob Nesler	April 22, 2010	314 (AA417/AA418)
69	8	"Something New Under the Sun"	Jeff McGrath	Joe Fallon	Zhenia Delioussine	April 22, 2010	314 (AA417/AA418)
"George Measures Up": Chef Pisghetti believes he's broken the world record for the world's longest strand of spaghetti with a strand of spaghetti that measures 30 feet long. He entrusts George to keep it safe from Gnocchi who thinks it is a really long cat toy until a lady from the world record book can come to measure it. But when the chef calls and asks how tall the building next door to the restaurant is and George tries to measure it, he finds that the chef's measuring tape is too short, but he does have a long piece of spaghetti. "Something New Under the Sun": It is the hottest day in the city and the city keeps suffering from blackouts, except for one place with electricity: the museum which just converted to being entirely powered by solar power. When George learns how the sun's light can be absorbed and turned into electricity, to do things like charge batteries, he tries to charge up several things at home such as his toy UFO or the cordless phone. Then he learns how solar power really works to make electricity. When another blackout makes the Man unable to cook his lasagna for the museum's big power upgrade party, he and George learn that the sun's heat can also be used to cook things.
70	9	"Movie House Monkey"	Cathy Malkasian	Bruce Akiyama	Pablo Solis	June 14, 2010	315 (AA419/AA420)
70	9	"Cooking With Monkey"	Scott Heming	Sandra Willard	Ken Kessel	June 14, 2010	315 (AA419/AA420)
"Movie House Monkey": The Man with the Yellow Hat is showing George around his old neighborhood when they come across the abandoned and run-down Bijou Theater that The Man used to visit all the time when he was little. Mr. Glass wants to tear the building down but George gets the idea that they should fix it up and reopen it. "Cooking With Monkey": Professor Wiseman wants to make something creative for the bake sale at Betsy's school. She believes that the key to cooking is to experiment with different amounts of different ingredients and as a result her cakes come out floppy, gross, and very sticky. When Professor Wiseman and George visit Chef Pisghetti he says that cooking is not about testing and experimenting like science and, but rather to follow a recipe exactly for the food to come out right.

=== Season 5 (2010–11) ===
No. overall	No. in season	Title	Directed by	Written by	Storyboard by	Original release date	Prod. code
71	1	"George and Marco Sound It Out"	Jeff McGrath	Kathy Waugh	Andrei Svislotski	September 6, 2010	501 (AA511/AA512)
71	1	"A Monkey's Duckling"	Scott Heming	Bill Burnett	Bob Nesler	September 6, 2010	501 (AA511/AA512)
"George and Marco Sound It Out": George is a huge fan of the Mexican family band Lobos de la Plata when they play in the park's old bandstand. When the old bandstand is torn down, George and his new friend Marco must find a new place for the band to play, but every place they try makes the band seem to sound awful. In the process they learn all about acoustics and how things such as a carpeted floor and a high ceiling make things sound different. "A Monkey's Duckling": It is George's first day of spring on the Renkins' farm and he and Bill arrive on the farm just in time to see Dumpling, the Renkins' duck sitting on her eggs to hatch them. But when she leaves and George sits on the eggs in her place, one of the eggs hatches and the duckling thinks George is its mother. George needs to try to get the duckling to see its real mother.
72	2	"Trader George"	Cathy Malkasian	Peter K. Hirsch	Rafael Rosado	September 7, 2010	504 (AA517/AA518)
72	2	"One in a Million Chameleon"	Scott Heming	Peter Bakalian	Frank Marino	September 7, 2010	504 (AA517/AA518)
"Trader George": George finds a cart in a keep pile when the man is looking for stuff to get rid of, but when George goes to the Renkins' farm for apple cider, he ends up trading the cart and tries to get it back multiple times. At a swap meeting his friend Vicki trades the cart to people from the city. Then George sees an artist who pushes the same cart and trades the cart for some sticks. "One in a Million Chameleon": George gets to meet Mr. Zoobel's newest pet, a chameleon. Mr. Zoobel tells George that the chameleon has a unique ability: she can change her skin color to blend in With her surroundings. After she breaks out and George cannot find her, he thinks she may have changed color to blend into her hiding place.
73	3	"George's Super Subway Adventure"	Cathy Malkasian	Lazar Saric	Pablo Solis	September 8, 2010	503 (AA515/AA516)
73	3	"Well Done, George"	Cathy Malkasian	Glen Berger	Curtis Cim	September 8, 2010	503 (AA515/AA516)
"George's Super Subway Adventure": George is in for a surprise — he and the Man are going to the zoo to see a Komodo dragon and they are going to ride the subway to get there. Along the way, George and the Man get separated and they have to get back together before they reach the zoo. Meanwhile, George learns all about how the subway operates and how it gets people between places. "Well Done, George": George is outside watering the garden when he gets muddy. He tries to take a bath but there's no water, not even in the sink. Mr. Quint explains that they have a broken pump and how to get the water, with a well and a pump. The pump they have is old. Then the Man explains that an electric pump sends it through a pipe to the house. They go back to the city since it'll take days to get a new pump. When they go to the apartment, they don't see an orange flier. It says the plumber must shut off the water now, meaning there's no water here, too, and George tries to get more water with a pipe.
74	4	"Downhill Racer"	Scott Heming	Chuck Tately and Raye Lankford	Llyn Hunter	February 21, 2011	502 (AA513/AA514)
74	4	"Book Monkey"	Cathy Malkasian	Scott Gray	Rafael Rosado	February 21, 2011	502 (AA513/AA514)
"Downhill Racer": George loves cars and when he hears about the annual Soap Box Derby race in the country, he and Allie decide to enter. They need to build a car first, but the rules say no help is allowed. They look at a book that shows them the parts they need to build a soap box derby racer and find out just what is needed to make one go downhill, and stop. "Book Monkey": George is off to one of his favorite places in the city, the library. When Mrs. Dewey the librarian has to run off, she leaves him in charge of the library to stack and sort books. When George has trouble finding a certain book, he decides to rearrange them, first by color, then by size. Then Steve tells him that the proper way to arrange books is by subject.
75	5	"Monkey-Size Me"	Scott Heming	Chuck Tately	Pablo Solis	February 22, 2011	505 (AA519/AA520)
75	5	"Metal Detective"	Cathy Malkasian	Lazar Saric	Andrew Austin	February 22, 2011	505 (AA519/AA520)
"Monkey-Size Me": It's The Man with the Yellow Hat's birthday and George wants to throw him a surprise party. The Doorman tells him what he needs to throw a good party, which includes cake, decorations, and friends, but George picks the wrong sizes for everything which leads to disaster. Then George has a dream about what the world would be like it if were monkey-size and decides that in a people-sized world, it is simply a matter of measuring to find the right size. "Metal Detective": George and the Man are staying at Professor Wiseman's beach house and George has his favorite toy: Yorbo the Robot. After taking it outside, it gets buried under the sand in a sudden thunderstorm and George wants to find it. He has trouble trying to find it on the huge beach, until a lady comes and shows him a metal detector. When George cannot use hers anymore, Professor Wiseman shows him how to make one out of an FM Radio and a calculator.
76	6	"George-O-Matic"	Cathy Malkasian	Peter Bakalian	Steve Loter	February 23, 2011	507 (AA523/AA524)
76	6	"Curious George, Sheep Herder"	Cathy Malkasian	Glen Berger	Andrew Austin	February 23, 2011	507 (AA523/AA524)
"George-O-Matic": At the museum, George discovers something he has never seen before - a vending machine and becomes curious as to how one works, thinking there is a farmer and an apple tree inside an apple machine. Then someone shows him what is really inside, a series of simple machines. The Man is asked by Professor Wiseman to host a party for two expedition groups at his apartment and leaves George in charge of dessert, but George decides to build his own vending machine to make it. "Curious George, Sheep Herder": At the annual Spring fair in the country, George and Allie come across a sheep shearer and a family making yarn out of a sheep's wool. They also come across a sheep herding contest where Mr. Renkins commands his dog, Bo with a special whistle to herd sheep. When they return home to the country house, the scarf George bought from the yarn makers begins to unravel and they need someone to fix it, but Jumpy Squirrel steals the yarn leaving them in search for more. It seems all of the Renkins' sheep were sheared at the fair and they begin to escape the pasture. George sees the whistle Mr. Renkins used to command Bo and uses it to command Bo to stop the sheep from escaping but is not sure how.
77	7	"George's Home Run"	Jeff McGrath	Lazar Saric	Pablo Solis	April 20, 2011	506 (AA521/AA522)
77	7	"Monkey On Ice"	Scott Heming	Kathy Waugh	Rafael Rosado	April 20, 2011	506 (AA521/AA522)
"George's Home Run": George gets to see his very first baseball game. Marco and his team the Cubbie Bears are playing in the city against the Tiger Babies. When the scorekeeper can not make it to the game, Marco leaves George in charge of keeping score, but George does not know how to count. Marco tells him how to count and makes him remember with a simple song. Later, though, George is also left in charge of the baseball park snack bar and he sees numbers higher than 10. "Monkey On Ice": In a sunny but snowy winter day in the country, George comes across Bill building an igloo in an attempt to earn his newest Sprout Badge. Bill tells him that to earn the badge, he will build an igloo and spend the night in it. George decides he would like to build an igloo of his own but he would like to make it big enough for all of his friends. Bill reminds him that smaller igloos hold more heat in but George remembers several thing Bill had done to make his igloo airtight. George and the Man build a larger igloo, but George does not make it airtight, and he winds up freezing in the middle of the night. He decides to build another igloo inside the house.
78	8	"Go West, Young Monkey"	Cathy Malkasian	John Loy	Curtis Cim	April 21, 2011	508 (AA525/AA526)
78	8	"Meet the New Neighbors"	Scott Heming	John Loy	Zhenia Delioussine	April 21, 2011	508 (AA525/AA526)
"Go West, Young Monkey": The Doorman orders a western town for his train set and Steve, Betsy, and George offer to help him put it together while he's at work. Hundley supervises. When the group accidentally sends a small pin from the train track into one of the plant pots, they must dump out all of the soil to search for the missing piece. Hundley falls asleep and dreams of himself and the group in a real western town. In his dream, George finds out how to make proper sifters to efficiently search for small objects, but in the end Hundley's sneezing is the secret to finding the pin. "Meet the New Neighbors": The Man in the Yellow Hat is busy preparing for dinner with Professor Wiseman, so he sends George to fetch some groceries for him. On the way, George realizes that their usual grocery store isn't open, but a new grocery specializing in Vietnamese food has opened across the street. George finds fruits and vegetables that are similar to the ingredients on his grocery list, but when he takes them home, he finds that they don't work in The Man in the Yellow Hat's recipes. George gets a tour of the store from the store owner's daughter, Mai.
79	9	"Follow That Boat"	Cathy Malkasian	Ron Holsey	Frank Marino	April 22, 2011	509 (AA527/AA528)
79	9	"Windmill Monkey"	Scott Heming	Lazar Saric	Llyn Hunter	April 22, 2011	509 (AA527/AA528)
"Follow That Boat": George is very impressed by the model papyrus boat that Steve has built for history class. Steve wants to find a way to test the boat out but when he is unable to in the museum he decides to go to Endless Park. A stray current caused by a rainstorm sends the boat on its way down the river and down a storm drain. Steve and George try to find the boat at the local waste treatment plant but due to the recent storm, the boat has completely bypassed the plant and floated out into the ocean. There, the waste treatment facility uses a skimming boat to collect floatables-trash that people have dumped into the ocean. They decide that Steve's boat may be floating in the ocean somewhere. "Windmill Monkey": George is busy planting food in the rooftop garden of the apartment building but has a problem as he can't stop Compass and his pigeon friends from eating all the seeds. He recalls how the Renkins built a scarecrow in their garden to scare away birds so he decides to do the same thing, but his is not scary enough to scare away any birds. Later, he and the Man with the Yellow Hat go to a farm in the country where George comes across a windmill. The farmer tells George that windmills can be used for many different things and they are all done with nothing but the power of the wind. George decides to build a windmill of his own to make his scarecrow move.
80	10	"Mother's Day Surprise"	Scott Heming	Karl Geurs	Andrei Svislotski	May 6, 2011	510 (AA529/AA530)
80	10	"Jungle Gym"	Cathy Malkasian	Bill Burnett	Dave Fontana	May 6, 2011	510 (AA529/AA530)
"Mother's Day Surprise": It is nearing Mother's Day in the city and Marco decides that he should throw his mom a fiesta complete with a homemade piñata. He and George try to build one out of papier-mâché but Marco forgets it takes days for it to dry. Then George decides that they can build one out of empty food containers, but Marco and George have trouble trying to get a piñata that is shaped like a donkey. "Jungle Gym": When George sees a cricket at the annual country gymnastics competition he decides to follow it across the gymnastics obstacles because, being a monkey, he is very good at jumping and swinging. When Mrs. Somersault the area gym teacher sees George, she decides to sign George and Allie up for her gym class, which Bill also agrees to join. While they all enjoy her gym class, they are disappointed to find out that it only takes place once a week and they decide to build a gym of their own in the back yard of the country house, where they can practice when it is not gym class day.

=== Season 6 (2011–12) ===
No. overall	No. in season	Title	Directed by	Written by	Storyboard by	Original release date	Prod. code
81	1	"Auctioneer George"	Scott Heming	Kathy Waugh	Zhenia Delioussine	September 5, 2011	603 (AA615/AA616)
81	1	"Sock Monkey Opera"	Scott Heming	Lazar Saric and Raye Lankford	Ken Kessel	September 5, 2011	603 (AA615/AA616)
"Auctioneer George": George and Marco are attending their first-ever auction in the city. The Man explains to George that the person with the highest bid wins the item, but forgets to set a limit on how much George can bid. George ends up inadvertently bidding $100 on a pair of mittens, and without the money to pay for the mittens, he has to re-auction them. Nobody seems to want the mittens, but George and Marco remember that Mr. Glass had his eyes on the same mittens. "Sock Monkey Opera": George, the Man, Aunt Margret, and Steve are going to see one of Betsy's favorite operas, Hansel & Gretel, but Betsy has to stay home because she has the chickenpox. When George sees the opera, he really enjoys it and feels sorry for Betsy having missed it. Since he had gotten a copy of the music from the opera, he decides to recreate it for Betsy. He soon finds out he has trouble playing all the parts, so he decides to make sock puppets of all the characters and draw the scenery. Now all George has to do is find a way to control the scenery as well as the characters.
82	2	"Hamster Cam"	Scott Heming	Scott Gray	Frank Marino	September 6, 2011	605 (AA619/AA620)
82	2	"The Great Monkey Detective"	Scott Heming	Chuck Tately	Curtis Cim	September 6, 2011	605 (AA619/AA620)
"Hamster Cam": Steve & George are busy making a map of the city while Betsy is doing a little experimenting with Professor Wismean's new micro-sized camera. After Steve loses his marker under the sofa, he decides to put the camera on his pet hamster, Hoagie. He places Hoagie on the couch but he winds up running out the door of the apartment and outside. George and Steve now have to find him. George takes the map they have made of the city and goes outside on a look for the hamster with Steve watching the cam on the computer and telling George where to go. Only problem is, George can't tell his left from his right literally. "The Great Monkey Detective": George is too excited to nap as Chef Pisghetti is showing a Basil Know-it-all detective film. Basil is George's favorite detective of all time. Upon arriving at the restaurant, George discovers a mystery of his own. Chef Pisghetti's recipe book is missing from its usual spot on the shelf. Because of missing his nap, George falls asleep during the movie but remembers a scene where Basil used a vase as a magnifying glass. In his dream, George does not have a vase but he can fill a plastic bag with water and round it up like a balloon. After waking up having missed most of the film, George tries to solve the mystery of the missing cookbook but he does not have a magnifying glass or a bag that can be filled and twisted without it leaking.
83	3	"George and the Giant Thumb"	Cathy Malkasian	Ron Holsey	Rafael Rosado	September 7, 2011	604 (AA617/AA618)
83	3	"Shutter Monkey"	Cathy Malkasian	Lazar Saric	Zhenia Delioussine	September 7, 2011	604 (AA617/AA618)
"George and the Giant Thumb": It has just rained in the country and Bill is having some trouble throwing newspapers due to a sprained thumb. When Allie and George see an article in the paper about a giant statue of a dog, they decide to make one as a tribute to Bill's thumb. They cannot seem to find the right building materials. George does not have enough clay, shaving cream is too runny, and peanut butter is too sticky. Eventually, with the recent rain, they try to make a statue out of mud, but they can't seem to get the mud to hold its shape. "Shutter Monkey": George always has the time to stop for a good picture with his friend The Man With the Yellow Hat. When Betsy takes his picture, she says she is entering a children's photography contest. Her pictures all have a basic shape hidden somewhere in them. She takes George to her apartment and shows him how she downloads the pictures on to her computer and prints them out. After a freak accident, Steve winds up destroying all of her pictures and he sends George to take new ones while he distracts Betsy. George remembers how all of the pictures have a basic shape and must find those shapes to get those pictures.
84	4	"School of Dance"	Cathy Malkasian	Raye Lankford	Cathy Malkasian	September 8, 2011	601 (AA611/AA612)
84	4	"Curious George Sounds Off"	Scott Heming	Raye Lankford	Elaine Hultgren	September 8, 2011	601 (AA611/AA612)
"School of Dance": Everyone in the country is excited about Allie's big dance party, except for Bill, who wants to avoid going to the party because he can't dance. George sees Mr. and Mrs. Renkins practicing the box step for the dance and that's when he decides that all he needs to do is teach Bill to dance. George however can't seem to figure out how to teach Bill unable to speak. That's when he decides that maybe, if a map can tell how to get someplace, maybe he can make one to tell Bill and the others who also wants to dance. All he has to do is figure out how to design the map to show which foot is left and right, which steps are small and big, and where to move a feet. "Curious George Sounds Off": Chef Pisghetti has some new friends outside the kitchen, the four hens Eeney, Meeney, Miney, and Freckles, so he can have the freshest eggs possible to use for his food, but the only problem is, his new hens don't seem to be making any. George decides to stay with the chickens overnight in their coop to see what is making them unhappy and soon finds out. Being in the middle of the noisy city, the chicken coop can be very noisy at night, keeping the chickens awake and making them tired. George decides to keep the chickens somewhere else less noisy. When he tries the library and they manage to lay a few eggs, he figures out what to do. All he needs to do is soundproof for the chicken coop. There are a lot of materials George can use in his apartment building's recycling room, but he just needs to figure out which ones work the best, for the soundproofing and the chickens.
85	5	"Wind Symphony"	Scott Heming	Kathy Waugh	Llyn Hunter	February 21, 2012	606 (AA621/AA622)
85	5	"George and Allie's Automated Car Wash"	Scott Heming	Matthew Baughman	Llyn Hunter	February 21, 2012	606 (AA621/AA622)
"Wind Symphony": Something unique is coming to the roof of George's Apartment Building - a symphony made out of wind put on by Mr. Zoobel and sponsored by Mr. Glass. The only problem is that Mr. Zoobel does not know how to put on a wind symphony. Mr. Zoobel wants a loud "Bong!", a long "Whoo", a "Tink-tink-tink", and lastly a nice "Snap!", and George may be just the monkey to help. All he needs are ordinary household objects, and wind. "George and Allie's Automated Car Wash": On a sunny Saturday afternoon in the country, George and The Man normally wash the cars, The Man's big car and all of George's toy cars. Today, they are doing something a little different and getting the car washed, at the country town's new automatic car wash. George and Allie are fascinated by how the car wash works and how it pulls the car through a line of different operations in a set order. When they get home, George and Allie decide to build an automatic car wash of their own to wash George's toy cars.
86	6	"Feeling Antsy"	Scott Heming	Scott Gray	Llyn Hunter	February 22, 2012	607 (AA623/AA624)
86	6	"Maple Monkey Madness"	Cathy Malkasian	Chuck Tately	Bob Nesler	February 22, 2012	607 (AA623/AA624)
"Feeling Antsy": One morning in the city, a breakfast mishap leads to a mess of food all over the floor of the apartment. The Man leaves George to clean it up before ants come into the apartment because, in his words, "once ants come into an apartment you can never get rid of them". Sure, enough, George finds one ant, then two, then an entire army, and Hundley's quest for a clean hallway leads him into George's apartment. Now George and Hundley have to work together to find how to get rid of the ants without hurting them and stop more ants from coming. Turns out, they discover that ants are scavengers-they will constantly move to find food, no matter where it is. "Maple Monkey Madness": It's a winter morning in the country, the perfect time for pancakes, but George and The Man seem to be out of syrup. The Man tells George that syrup comes from trees, but not growing on them, but in them, by taping the trees. George and Allie cannot get any syrup to come out no matter how hard they tap the trees. Then Mr. Renkins shows them that to tap a tree they need a few tools and a small hole in the tree, and once it is done, a small liquid starts dripping out of the tree. This liquid is gray and very bitter, not like syrup, because as Mr. Renkins explains, it is sap, and needs to be boiled into syrup.
87	7	"DJ George"	Cathy Malkasian	Scott Gray	Broni Likomanov	April 16, 2012	608 (AA625/AA626)
87	7	"Curious George Paints The Desert"	Scott Heming	Scott Gray	Bob Nesler	April 16, 2012	608 (AA625/AA626)
"DJ George": George and The Man With the Yellow Hat are excited because The Man's favorite jazz musician, Bonnie Smooth is coming to town and Howlin' Hal, the DJ at the local radio station is giving out front-row tickets to her concert. George and The Man win the tickets and go to the local radio station to claim them, where Howlin' Hal shows George how the radio station works. In a mishap, George winds up locked inside the DJ room with Howlin' Hal and The Man locked out and Bonnie Smooth about to call in to the station to debut her new song. The two need to find a way for George to take the call and broadcast it. "Curious George Paints The Desert": George, The Man With the Yellow Hat, and Mr. and Mrs. Quint are going to the desert to dig for fossils. When they arrive, George meets an Indigenous chief named John, who shows him how he paints out of desert sand colored with natural chemicals. John paints a picture of George in the sand but a few bunnies come and eat his painting. After John leaves to help The Man and Mr. Quint, George decides to make his own sand paint and paint his own picture. George soon finds that all the sand in the desert is the same shade of light brown, but he discovers how fruits and vegetables can be used to color the sand. He also needs to make sure that the sand is dry so it can flow from his hands. Once he figures out the recipe for good colored sand paint, he just needs to find a way to stop it from blowing away in the desert sand, and to make it bunny-proof.
88	8	"No Knowing Gnocchi"	Jeff McGrath	Glen Berger	Zhenia Delioussine	April 18, 2012	610 (AA629/AA630)
88	8	"Here Comes The Tide"	Cathy Malkasian	Justin Tolley and Raye Lankford	Broni Likomanov	April 18, 2012	610 (AA629/AA630)
"No Knowing Gnocchi": Chef Pisghetti has a problem and it has stopped him from cooking his pasta al dente. Gnocchi seems to be running away from the restaurant during the day for no reason at all, and it began after the chef did some cleaning up around the place to stop her from scratching a few items, including the restaurant's wooden back door. George decides to follow her around to see where she is going all day and every day. He finds Gnocchi at a shipyard scratching bags of rice, the park scratching a tree, dump scratching cardboard, the construction site scratching a painted canvas and a Mexican restaurant scratching a menu board, which has the chef worried that Gnocchi now prefers Mexican food. George later discovers that all the things she has been scratching feel the same as a few items the chef threw out, so he needs to create a new area of items that feel the same so she can stay around the restaurant. "Here Comes The Tide": George and Marco have gone on vacation with Professor Wiseman and The Man with the Yellow Hat to the beach. They have all come for a vacation on the beach as well as to observe the tides and the tidal pools. Professor Wiseman explains to George and Marco that in ancient times, items left on the beach had been buried by the tides almost like buried treasure, leaving George and Marco to try to bury a box of treasure on the beach themselves, including Marco's favorite toy, Silverwolf, a small silver plastic wolf. They later decide to locate and dig up the treasure but they can't seem to find it, and the water is deeper than it was before. They also get distracted by a friendly and playful dolphin in the water. They later see how the tides constantly change the shore and how they are always moving, even surfacing the treasure they couldn't find before.
89	9	"Junky Monkey"	Scott Heming	Bill Burnett	Elaine Hultgren	April 20, 2012	609 (AA627/AA628)
89	9	"Jumpy Warms Up"	Jeff McGrath	Raye Lankford	Ken Kessel	April 20, 2012	609 (AA627/AA628)
"Junky Monkey": It is Pretty City Day in the Big City. George is a member of Steve's pod, a group of people that will help clean up the city, and his group has been assigned to clean up George's street. The winner gets their face on a poster. George begins his work cleaning the city but a lot of the things he sees being thrown out are too amazing to put in the trash. When he decides to bring those things home, he winds up with more keepsakes than trash. That's when The Man With the Yellow Hat explains that a collection is made up of things that are related or the same, like his collection of pig sculptures. Now George has to decide what to keep and what kinds of the same things to keep. "Jumpy Warms Up": It is a record-setting winter in the country - one of the coldest in recent years. Even Jumpy, normally an outdoor animal has to find refuge in George and The Man's Country House. The Man himself finds though, that the country house seems to be extra cold. He then finds that the house has several small holes in the walls, and others areas where cold air, and the occasional squirrel can leak in. He decides that he needs to insulate the house, because insulation is designed to keep a house warm, but sealing up all those holes makes Jumpy unwelcome. Feeling sorry for him, George decides to make a fully insulated house for Jumpy that will keep him warm and happy all winter.
90	10	"George Buys a Kite"	Jeff McGrath	Karl Geurs	Bob Nesler	June 25, 2012	602 (AA613/AA614)
90	10	"Train of Light"	Scott Heming	John Loy	Frank Marino	June 25, 2012	602 (AA613/AA614)
"George Buys a Kite": While flying their kite one day in the country, George and Bill are forced to buy a new kite after it is destroyed in a freak accident. George and Bill find a fancy new kite at Ada and Luke's General Store and decide to place it on layaway until they can get enough money to buy it. Bill and George decide to form a task force to earn enough money to buy the kite. They then have to decide the most efficient order to perform the tasks in and how much time to spend on each. The one thing George later realizes they forgot was to plan their jobs according to the weather, with indoor jobs on rainy or windy days and outdoor jobs on sunny days. "Train of Light": One of George's favorite things to do in the city is visit Mabel's Department Store, because there are so many things to do. One day while The Man With the Yellow Hat is doing his shopping George sees something he never has before, a moving light in the shape of a train, and soon discovers that a lamp with a rotating shade is making it. Fascinated by the light, George decides to make his own moving light for home, but when he stays at the store too long to find out how he winds up locked in after hours. With nothing else to do, George decides to make his own moving light right in the store.

=== Season 7 (2012–13) ===
This is the first season of Curious George to be close captioned by Captions, Inc. when seen on PBS Kids in the United States of America with the new version of the close captioning by Captions, Inc. from Clockstoppers with all spoken text close captions lowercase.

No. overall	No. in season	Title	Directed by	Written by	Storyboard by	Original release date	Prod. code
91	1	"Monkey Down Under"	Andrei Svisloski	Lazar Saric	Celia Kendrick	December 3, 2012	701 (AA701)
91	1	"Bright Lights, Little Monkey"	Scott Heming	Ken Scarborough	Barry Vodos	December 3, 2012	701 (AA701)
"Monkey Down Under": George and the Man with the Yellow Hat go on a safari in the Australian outback. When the man goes dugong sighting, George stays at the camp and investigates what creature has been making these footprints near the camp. "Bright Lights, Little Monkey": George, Bill and Allie stay up late to search for a mysterious creature which, at least, they think is a creature.
92	2	"We Otter Be Friends"	Scott Heming	Raye Lankford	Joe Horne	December 4, 2012	702 (AA702)
92	2	"Sir George and the Dragon"	Jeff McGrath	Raye Lankford	Rafael Rosado	December 4, 2012	702 (AA702)
"We Otter Be Friends": An otter swims away with the keys to Mr. Quint's boat, and George must try to get them back. "Sir George and the Dragon": Preparing for his first role on stage, George has a dream about being a medieval castle guard.
93	3	"Hundley Jr."	Andrei Svisloski	Scott Gray	Roy Smith	December 5, 2012	703 (AA703)
93	3	"Curious George Gets Winded"	Andrei Svisloski	Ross Canter	Dave Williams	December 5, 2012	703 (AA703)
"Hundley Jr.": Hundley tries to take care of a caterpillar, while also balancing his new-found "parenthood" with his official duties guarding the lobby. "Curious George Gets Winded": Bill is trying to win the "Golden Pouch", an award for newspaper carriers, but he is thwarted by a snowstorm.
94	4	"Where's The Firedog?"	Andrei Svisloski	Scott Gray	Jim Beihold	February 4, 2013	704 (AA704)
94	4	"Toot Toot Tootsie Goodbye"	Jeff McGrath	Peter K. Hirsch	Cathy Malkasian	February 4, 2013	704 (AA704)
"Where's The Firedog?": The firehouse's new mascot Blaze keeps running away, eventually ending up in the animal shelter. "Toot Toot Tootsie Goodbye": When the Man with the Yellow Hat catches a cold, George has another dream about Toots the blues-singing germ.
95	5	"Honey of a Monkey"	Jeff McGrath	Ron Holsey	Lou Scarborough	April 23, 2013	705 (AA705)
95	5	"Curious George's Egg Hunt"	Scott Heming	Ross Canter	Bert Ring	April 23, 2013	705 (AA705)
"Honey of a Monkey": George and Steve accidentally eat all of Betsy's honeycombs. "Curious George's Egg Hunt": George and Allie find an egg in the grass, but they cannot seem to find the mother bird or her nest.
96	6	"George and Allie's Lawn Service"	Scott Heming	John Loy	Bob Nesler and Trevor Tamboline	April 24, 2013	706 (AA706)
96	6	"Curious George's Scavenger Hunt"	Scott Heming	Ross Canter and Ken Scarborough	Delia Gosman	April 24, 2013	706 (AA706)
"George and Allie's Lawn Service": George and Allie try to keep two baby goats from escaping. "Curious George's Scavenger Hunt": George, Marco, and Chef Pisghetti all compete in a charity event for the local animal shelter.

=== Season 8 (2014) ===
No. overall	No. in season	Title	Directed by	Written by	Storyboard by	Original release date	Prod. code
97	1	"Toy Monkey"	Andrei Svislotski	Ron Holsey	Bert Ring	February 10, 2014	801
97	1	"George and Allie's Game Plan"	Andrei Svislotski	Ron Holsey	Adam Henry	February 10, 2014	801
"Toy Monkey": The Man's Aunt Sylvia (guest star Carol Burnett) brings George a toy front-loader as a present, but it turns out to be defective, so they go to the toy factory to get it fixed. At the factory, they find a room full of broken toys and nobody fixing them. George and Aunt Sylvia then decide to fix the defective front-loader themselves. "George and Allie's Game Plan": George goes to the annual weekend fair with Allie and The Man with the Yellow Hat. Allie plans to win a teddy bear from a game. When she learns she is poor at the game, George convinces her to practice at home.
98	2	"Monkey Hoedown"	Scott Heming	Lazar Saric	Cathy Malkasian	February 11, 2014	802
98	2	"Curious George Clowns Around"	Scott Heming	Lazar Saric	Carolyn Gair	February 11, 2014	802
"Monkey Hoedown": George and Allie wash The Man's guitar, but it breaks down, so they build a new one made out of other stuff. It doesn't sound well, but it still is used in a concert. This guitar gave The Man an idea for lyrics for his song. "Curious George Clowns Around": George and the Man with the Yellow Hat visit the Clown College for Pepe El Loco's Big Show. George has to substitute for a messenger clown and has to make pickups. He does not know how to count from any number except one, so every time he makes a delivery, he must start on floor one and count his way up the building.
99	3	"George's Backwards Flight Plan"	Scott Heming	Scott Gray	Llyn Hunter	February 12, 2014	803
99	3	"Curious George, Hog Trainer"	Andrei Svislotski	John Loy	Adam Henry	February 12, 2014	803
"George's Backwards Flight Plan": Professor Wiseman is set to launch B.I.R.D., her bird migration tracking device, but the remote control isn't functioning properly, as everything on it is reversed. "Curious George, Hog Trainer": George and Allie are determined to help Howie the Hog win a blue ribbon at the state fair.
100	4	"Red Planet Monkey"	Scott Heming	Joe Fallon	Dan Kubat	May 19, 2014	806
100	4	"Tortilla Express"	Scott Heming	Ken Scarborough	Delia Gosman	May 19, 2014	806
"Red Planet Monkey": George is thrilled to visit Pizza and Einstein's Space Center to help solve a problem with the Mars rover, but a sleepy monkey falls asleep and wakes to discover that he and the Man with the Yellow Hat are going to Mars. "Tortilla Express": When the grocer runs out of masa (cornmeal), George and Marco are worried they won't be able to make Marco's famous tortillas for his abuela's birthday. Thankfully, Uncle Enrique makes it his mission to find the key ingredient. During their ride on the "Tortilla Express", all three learn where masa comes from and how it gets from the farm to Marco's table.
101	5	"Curious George Goes for 100"	Jeff McGrath	Joe Fallon	Cathy Malkasian	May 20, 2014	804
101	5	"Fearless George"	Jeff McGrath	Joe Fallon	Cathy Malkasian	May 20, 2014	804
"Curious George Goes for 100": It's Lake Wannasink Lake's 100th anniversary and George is in charge of the main attraction - the town's 100-year-old-flag with 10 stripes and 100 stars. When the stripes accidentally blow away, George runs around the countryside to retrieve them. "Fearless George": "Fearless George" and his comrades (aka Steve and Betsy) are playing a make-believe adventure with George's toys, but putting away toys only to set them up again the next day really eats into play time.
102	6	"Big, Bad Hundley"	Scott Heming	Chuck Tately; Story by : Raye Lankford	Llyn Hunter	May 21, 2014	805
102	6	"George's Simple Siphon"	Andrei Svislotski	Jana Howington	Alex Mann	May 21, 2014	805
"Big, Bad Hundley": When Hundley notices a big dog named Goliath helping the Doorman in the lobby, he wishes he was taller. George and Marco try to help the dachshund by giving him stilts, platform shoes, and even a fun house mirror to makes Hundley look big, but nothing cheers Hundley up until he figures out that good things come in all sizes. "George's Simple Siphon": On the first hot day of summer, George, Bill and Allie decide to take a dip in Bill's pool only to discover that the pool is filled with algae. Even oars, rubber boots, pots, pans, and yellow rain hats won't empty the green water. Hot and tired, George gets a refreshing idea while sipping lemonade from his super long straw.

=== Season 9 (2014–15) ===
This is the final season of Curious George to be close captioned by Captions, Inc. when seen on PBS Kids in the USA.

No. overall	No. in season	Title	Directed by	Written by	Storyboard by	Original release date	Prod. code
103	1	"Submonkey"	Andrei Svislotski	Joe Fallon	Carolyn Gair	October 28, 2014	901
103	1	"Double-O Monkey Tracks Trouble"	Scott Heming	Raye Lankford	Celia Kendrick	October 28, 2014	901
"Submonkey": When Professor Pizza's birthday present is dragged away by a strong ocean current, George volunteers to take an undersea adventure in a monkey-sized submarine to retrieve it. "Double-O Monkey Tracks Trouble": Double-O-Monkey takes on his most important case yet - to prevent Steve's well-intentioned (but always disastrous) "good luck present" from ruining Betsy's dance recital. Using his super spy skills and all five of his senses, George tracks down Steve and discovers, on his surprise, a bucket of wet paint.
104	2	"Monkey Goes Batty"	Andrei Svislotski	John Loy	Bert Ring	October 29, 2014	902
104	2	"Curious George and the Balloon Hound"	Andrei Svislotski	Joe Fallon	Calvin Suggs	October 29, 2014	902
"Monkey Goes Batty": A hole in the roof means George and the Man with the Yellow Hat must sleep in the living room while their bedrooms are being repaired. Their adventure quickly turns into a disaster when George's nightly trips to the kitchen keep the Man awake at night. "Curious George and the Balloon Hound": George and Hundley are amazed by all the flying machines at the museum's aviation exhibit. When Hundley's souvenir airship flies out of reach in the lobby, he dreams he is British flying ace in the 1909 International Airshow Imprace, Leftenant Doxie. Joined by the daring flyboy Chuck Monkey, the dynamic duo use propeller power as they race towards the finish line. When Hundley awakens from his dream, he has a few new ideas on how to get his ceiling bound toy within reach.
105	3	"George's Photo Finish"	Scott Heming	Joe Fallon	Joe Horne	October 30, 2014	903
105	3	"Monkey Mystery Gift"	Andrei Svislotski	Chuck Tately	Roy Meurin	October 30, 2014	903
"George's Photo Finish": Today is the big unveiling of the Ankylosaurus dinosaur skeleton at the Museum, but it's missing a leg. George and the Man with the Yellow Hat thought they delivered all four bones. Fortunately for them, Mr. Quint took pictures on their way to the Museum and the photos can lead them to the bone if they can only figure out which order to put them in. "Monkey Mystery Gift": George and Allie's imaginations run wild as they brainstorm what could be in the large unmarked box on George's doorstep. Based on its weight, sound, smell, and bristly hair, they're certain it's a baby goat, but what's really inside surprises them more than anything they could have ever imagined.
106	4	"Happy Valentine's Day, George"	Scott Heming	John Loy	Cathy Malkasian	February 9, 2015	904
106	4	"Oh Deer"	Andrei Svislotski	Ron Holsey	Joe Horne	February 9, 2015	904
"Happy Valentine's Day, George": George wants to make his friends the best Valentine's Day card ever, but even with four paws, it takes a long time to create homemade cards for everyone. With a little help from sponge shapes, red paint, and a waffle iron, George creates the first ever monkey Valentine's Printing Press. "Oh Deer": When a hungry deer keeps nibbling on the flowers in George and Allie's garden, George uses all of his five senses to keep the deer out, but a scarecrow, loud noises, tape, and rotten eggs don't work, leaving George with one last sense -- taste.
107	5	"George's Curious Dragon Dance"	Scott Heming	Scott Gray	Llyn Hunter	March 30, 2015	905
107	5	"Bowling for Bobolinks"	Andrei Svislotski	Melissa Bush	Dave Williams	March 30, 2015	905
"George's Curious Dragon Dance": George and Marco are excited to help their new friend Lily practice the dragon dance for the Chinese New Year parade., but when they accidentally ruin the nose on the dragon costume, it's a race against the clock to fix it in time. "Bowling for Bobolinks": The Man & George are put in charge of the country's bowling alley, due to one of the owners getting bowling balls stuck to their hands. George is tasked with putting all the shoes back on the shelf, but does it in random order. He realises his mistake of not noticing the size and age group, fixing it in time for the charity game for the bobolink, a rare songbird.
108	6	"Curious George's Amazon Adventure"	Andrei Svislotski	Scott Gray and Raye Lankford	Lou Scarborough and Dave Williams	April 1, 2015	906
108	6	"Monkey Senses"	Scott Heming	Chuck Tately	Dan Kubat	April 1, 2015	906
"Curious George's Amazon Adventure": To raise awareness for the rainforest, Professor Wiseman enlists George and the Man with the Yellow Hat to help make a film about the different plants, animals, and insects that call it home. When a frisky tamarin monkey runs off with their camera, the chase is on. "Monkey Senses": George, Steve, Hundley, and Gnocchi get stuck in the back of a delivery truck after Steve steps inside in order to get out of the sun and see his handheld video game better. When the truck finally stops and George helps them escape, they are lost and must use their senses and memory to figure out how to get back home.

=== Season 10 (2018) ===
No. overall	No. in season	Title	Directed by	Written by	Storyboard by	Original release date	US air date	Prod. code
109	1	"Pop!"	Andrei Svislotski	Chuck Tately	Andrei Svislotski	September 3, 2018	October 5, 2020	1001
109	1	"George & Allie's Egg-cellent Adventure"	Scott Heming	Chuck Tately	Scott Heming	September 3, 2018	October 5, 2020	1001
"Pop!": George gets distracted by a bird while he is working at a popcorn stand. "George & Allie's Egg-cellent Adventure": Allie and George gather chicken eggs for Mrs. Renkins.
110	2	"George's Sleepover"	Andrei Svislotski	Melissa Berg	Kirk Hanson	September 10, 2018	October 6, 2020	1002
110	2	"Curious George Goes to the Dentist"	Scott Heming	Chuck Tately	Mike Milo	September 10, 2018	October 6, 2020	1002
"George's Sleepover": George invites his animal friends over for a sleepover. "Curious George Goes to the Dentist": After waking up with a toothache, George has to visit his dentist.
111	3	"Monkey Under Ice"	Andrei Svislotski	John Loy	Vitaly Shafirov	September 17, 2018	October 7, 2020	1003
111	3	"George's New Sound"	Scott Heming	Cliff Ruby and Elana Lesser	Llyn Hunter	September 17, 2018	October 7, 2020	1003
"Monkey Under Ice": George goes ice fishing in the Arctic. "George's New Sound": The firehouse band practices for its annual pancake breakfast.
112	4	"Chipmonkey"	Andrei Svislotski	Melissa Berg	Aluir Amancio	September 24, 2018	October 8, 2020	1004
112	4	"Loch Ness Monkey"	Scott Heming	Dietrich Smith	Clint Taylor	September 24, 2018	October 8, 2020	1004
"Chipmonkey": After a stash of acorns go missing, Jumpy thinks that George is the culprit. "Loch Ness Monkey": George visits the Man in the Yellow Hat's Uncle Tam in Scotland, where he learns about the Loch Ness Monster.
113	5	"George Lights Up the Night"	Andrei Svislotski	John Loy	Kirk Hanson	October 1, 2018	October 9, 2020	1005
113	5	"George and the Jug Owl"	Scott Heming	Jessica Carleton	Mike Milo	October 1, 2018	October 9, 2020	1005
"George Lights Up the Night": While in the Maldives, George befriends a pod of dolphins before joining a boat trip to a coral reef. "George and the Jug Owl": When George discovers a jug that "hoots", he thinks it's a new creature.
114	6	"Four Hands, Eight Arms"	Andrei Svislotski	Jessica Carleton	Vitaly Shafirov	October 8, 2018	March 15, 2021	1006
114	6	"Oil Saves the Day"	Scott Heming	Adam Rudman	Llyn Hunter	October 8, 2018	March 15, 2021	1006
"Four Hands, Eight Arms": George visits Pizza and Einstein's marine rehabilitation lab. "Oil Saves the Day": George makes banana bread for the Renkin household.
115	7	"Meteor Monkey"	Andrei Svislotski	Dietrich Smith	Kirk Hanson and Andrei Svislotski	October 15, 2018	March 17, 2021	1008
115	7	"George Gets Pickled"	Scott Heming	Fred Stroppel	Mike Milo	October 15, 2018	March 17, 2021	1008
"Meteor Monkey": Mr. Griggs takes a photo of a comet that hits Mars using his telescope. "George Gets Pickled": George and the Man don't know what to do with their cucumbers.
116	8	"Night at the Amusement Park"	Andrei Svislotski	Chuck Tately	Vitaly Shafirov	October 22, 2018	March 18, 2021	1009
116	8	"Hockey Monkey"	Scott Heming	John Loy	Llyn Hunter	October 22, 2018	March 18, 2021	1009
"Night at the Amusement Park": George loses his Pirate Petey toy at the amusement park. "Hockey Monkey": George builds a backyard rink so Bill can teach him how to play hockey.
117	9	"Sleepy Sheep"	Andrei Svislotski	Jessica Carleton	Rafael Rosado	October 29, 2018	March 19, 2021	1010
117	9	"Gummy Monkey"	Scott Heming	Raye Lankford	Clint Taylor and Sahin Ersoz	October 29, 2018	March 19, 2021	1010
"Sleepy Sheep": On New Year's Eve, George is so excited that he can't sleep, so he tries to count sheep. "Gummy Monkey": George gets a wad of gum stuck in his hair and gets glued to some flowers.
118	10	"Bill on Wheels"	Andrei Svislotski and Scott Heming	Ron Holsey	Christian Lignan, Mike Milo and Kathy Carr	November 5, 2018	May 10, 2021	1011
Bill breaks his leg while hiking with George and ends up in the hospital, where he meets a girl who uses a wheelchair to get around. Note: This is a double-length episode.
119	11	"A Fair to Remember"	Andrei Svislotski	Cliff Ruby and Elana Lesser	Vitaly Shafirov	November 12, 2018	May 11, 2021	1012
119	11	"The Great Doxie Round-Up"	Scott Heming	Chuck Tately	Llyn Hunter	November 12, 2018	May 11, 2021	1012
"A Fair to Remember": When the annual country carnival gets cancelled, George decides to build a carnival in the backyard. "The Great Doxie Round-Up": George has to dog-sit a circus troupe of dachshunds before their big show.
120	12	"Muster Monkey"	Andrei Svislotski	Chuck Tately	Rafael Rosado	November 19, 2018	May 12, 2021	1013
120	12	"Traffic Monkey"	Scott Heming	Ron Holsey	Clint Taylor	November 19, 2018	May 12, 2021	1013
"Muster Monkey": It's the day of the annual fireman's muster and the country volunteer squad (including George) must face off the fire department. "Traffic Monkey": George notices that the hotel lobby is so packed that no one can get through.
121	13	"Curious George and the Wake-Up Machine"	Andrei Svislotski	Jessica Carleton	Zhenia Delioussine	November 26, 2018	May 13, 2021	1014
121	13	"Healing Hundley"	Scott Heming	Melissa Berg	Aluir Amancio	November 26, 2018	May 13, 2021	1014
"Curious George and the Wake-Up Machine": George falls asleep and misses the chance to go fishing with Bill. "Healing Hundley": George feels sad when Hundley must wear a cone around his neck.
122	14	"Pig-Headed George"	Andrei Svislotski	Matt Hoverman	Vitaly Shafirov	December 3, 2018	May 14, 2021	1015
122	14	"Nightmare on N Street"	Scott Heming	Chuck Tately	Llyn Hunter	December 3, 2018	May 14, 2021	1015
"Pig-Headed George": George tries to take care of a newborn piglet. "Nightmare on N Street": George tries to avoid a nightmare involving a rhinoceros.
123	15	"Curious George and the Snow Festival"	Andrei Svislotski and Scott Heming	Cliff Ruby and Elana Lesser	Aluir Amancio and Clint Taylor	December 10, 2018	March 16, 2021	1007
George visits a snow festival in Japan. Note: This is a double-length episode.

=== Season 11 (2019) ===
No. overall	No. in season	Title	Directed by	Written by	Storyboard by	Original release date	US air date	Prod. code
124	1	"Monkey the Magnificent"	Scott Heming	Craig Carlisle	Clint Taylor	May 6, 2019	July 5, 2021	1101 (201)
124	1	"Curious George: Cat Sitter"	Andrei Svislotski	Jeff Goode	Sahin Ersoz	May 6, 2019	July 5, 2021	1101 (201)
"Monkey the Magnificent": George becomes obsessed with magic when he sees Marco performing as a magician. "Curious George: Cat Sitter": George helps Betsy and Steve with their pet-sitting business.
125	2	"George's High-Tech Sleep Over"	Scott Heming	Jonathan Greenberg	Mike Milo	May 13, 2019	July 6, 2021	1102 (202)
125	2	"The Ring's the Thing"	Andrei Svislotski	Sherri Stoner	Zhenia Delioussine	May 13, 2019	July 6, 2021	1102 (202)
"George's High-Tech Sleep Over": George spends the night at Professor Wiseman's apartment. "The Ring's the Thing": George accidentally loses Bill's mother's wedding rings.
126	3	"It Was a Dark and Stormy Night"	Andrei Svislotski	Melissa Berg	Vitaly Shafirov	May 20, 2019	July 7, 2021	1103 (203)
126	3	"Curious George, Dog Groomer"	Scott Heming	Melissa Berg	Llyn Hunter and Andrew Austin	May 20, 2019	July 7, 2021	1103 (203)
"It Was a Dark and Stormy Night": George try to ease Charkie's fear of thunder. "Curious George, Dog Groomer": George helps Charkie get groomed for a photo shoot.
127	4	"In Search of Space Monkeys"	Andrei Svislotski and Scott Heming	Jeff Goode	Sahin Ersoz and Clint Taylor	May 27, 2019	July 8, 2021	1104 (204)
George, Gnocchi, and Marco try to search the Solar System for monkeys. Note: This is a double-length episode.
128	5	"Fly Paper"	Andrei Svislotski	George Arthur Bloom	Zhenia Delioussine	June 3, 2019	July 9, 2021	1105 (205)
128	5	"Fix-It Monkey"	Scott Heming	Peter K. Hirsch	Mike Milo	June 3, 2019	July 9, 2021	1105 (205)
"Fly Paper": George and Betsy try to get into Mr. Glass' record book by making a paper airplane. "Fix-It Monkey": George meets a new carpenter named Rosa and is fascinated by her fancy tool belt.
129	6	"All Washed Up"	Andrei Svislotski	Melissa Berg	Vitaly Shafirov	June 10, 2019	July 12, 2021	1106 (206)
129	6	"George's Fancy Pants"	Scott Heming	Matt Hoverman	Llyn Hunter	June 10, 2019	July 12, 2021	1106 (206)
"All Washed Up": George learns to use a Laundromat when the washing machine breaks down. "George's Fancy Pants": George gets a tuxedo to wear for when he presents Chef Pisgetti with the Garlic Press Award.
130	7	"Lights, Camera, Action!"	Andrei Svislotski	Jonathan Greenberg	Sahin Ersoz	June 17, 2019	July 13, 2021	1107 (207)
130	7	"Pen Pals"	Scott Heming	Jeff Goode	Clint Taylor	June 17, 2019	July 13, 2021	1107 (207)
"Lights, Camera, Action!": George helps Betsy and Steve make a film and learns that some things don't always go according to the script. "Pen Pals": When Bill and Betsy become pen pals, George thinks that Jumpy and Charkie could be pen pals too.
131	8	"Orange Crush"	Andrei Svislotski	Chuck Tately	Zhenia Delioussine	June 24, 2019	July 14, 2021	1108 (208)
131	8	"Monkey Market"	Scott Heming	Cliff Ruby and Elana Lesser	Mike Milo	June 24, 2019	July 14, 2021	1108 (208)
"Orange Crush": While running an orange juice stand with Bill, George gets fascinated by the special trucks used by the highway crew. "Monkey Market": George is excited to help the Renkins at the city's farmer's market.
132	9	"Your Churn, George"	Andrei Svislotski	Glen Berger	Vitaly Shafirov	July 1, 2019	July 15, 2021	1109 (209)
132	9	"Going Nuts"	Scott Heming	George Arthur Bloom and Peter K. Hirsch	Christian Lignan	July 1, 2019	July 15, 2021	1109 (209)
"Your Churn, George": George volunteers to make some butter and soon discovers the process is harder than a run to the supermarket. "Going Nuts": George gets involved in a territorial dispute.
133	10	"Flower Monkey"	Andrei Svislotski	Gentry Menzel	Sahin Ersoz	July 8, 2019	July 16, 2021	1110 (210)
133	10	"George and the Golden Egg Hunt"	Scott Heming	Sherri Stoner	Clint Taylor	July 8, 2019	July 16, 2021	1110 (210)
"Flower Monkey": George and the gang plant flowers in the park. "George and the Golden Egg Hunt": George hides the eggs for the Golden Egg Hunt.
134	11	"Curious Gorge"	Andrei Svislotski	Chuck Tately	Zhenia Delioussine	July 15, 2019	July 19, 2021	1111 (211)
134	11	"A Sound Story"	Scott Heming	Glen Berger	Kathy Carr	July 15, 2019	July 19, 2021	1111 (211)
"Curious Gorge": While on a fossil quest through a gorge, George floats down a river and gets lost. "A Sound Story": Betsy is invited to read a story for a radio show.
135	12	"Delivery Monkey"	Andrei Svislotski	Jonathan Greenberg	Vitaly Shafirov	July 22, 2019	July 20, 2021	1112 (212)
135	12	"Another Mystery Package"	Scott Heming	Gentry Menzel	Christian Lignan	July 22, 2019	July 20, 2021	1112 (212)
"Delivery Monkey": George helps out as a delivery monkey for Chef Pisgetti. "Another Mystery Package": George receives an unmarked package in the mail.
136	13	"Monkey Clean, Monkey Do"	Andrei Svislotski	Melissa Berg	Sahin Ersoz	July 29, 2019	July 21, 2021	1113 (213)
136	13	"A River Runs Through It"	Scott Heming	Peter Ferland	Clint Taylor	July 29, 2019	July 21, 2021	1113 (213)
"Monkey Clean, Monkey Do": George accidentally squirts mustard on a tuxedo. "A River Runs Through It": George digs a trench from a nearby stream.
137	14	"The Lost Treasure of Bugaboo Bend"	Andrei Svislotski	Chuck Tately	Zhenia Delioussine	August 5, 2019	July 22, 2021	1114 (214)
137	14	"Apple Pie of My Eye"	Scott Heming	Kay Donmyer	Kathy Carr	August 5, 2019	July 22, 2021	1114 (214)
"The Lost Treasure of Bugaboo Bend": After finding a treasure map in one of the Man's childhood books, George and the Man go on a treasure hunt. "Apple Pie of My Eye": George finds out that different ingredients can look alike.
138	15	"Buggy House"	Andrei Svislotski	Sherri Stoner	Vitaly Shafirov	August 12, 2019	July 23, 2021	1115 (215)
138	15	"Rubber Band-It"	Scott Heming	Christine Ecklund	Christian Lignan and Zhenia Delioussine	August 12, 2019	July 23, 2021	1115 (215)
"Buggy House": George builds a house for a bug. "Rubber Band-It": George and Steve build a rubber-band ball.

=== Season 12 (2020) ===
No. overall	No. in season	Title	Directed by	Written by	Storyboard by	Original release date	US air date	Prod. code
139	1	"For Your Ice Only"	Andrei Svislotski	Chuck Tately	Zhenia Delioussine	February 3, 2020	January 7, 2022	1201a (301a)
139	1	"George & the Unforgettable Father's Day"	Scott Heming	Melissa Berg	Kelly James	February 3, 2020	January 7, 2022	1201a (301a)
"For Your Ice Only": A heat wave threatens a snowman George has kept in the freezer since the winter. "George & the Unforgettable Father's Day": George learns to make a totem pole for Father's Day.
140	2	"Over the Edge"	Andrei Svislotski	Lauren Strasburger	Vitaly Shafirov	February 4, 2020	January 14, 2022	1214a (314a) 1214b (314b)
140	2	"A Rose by Any Other Name"	Scott Heming	Peter Ferland	Joseph Chang	February 4, 2020	January 14, 2022	1214a (314a) 1214b (314b)
"Over the Edge": Steve needs help getting over his fear of getting splashed in the face with water. "A Rose by Any Other Name": George tries to get rid of a stench.
141	3	"Leaky Faucet"	Andrei Svislotski	Diane Kredensor and Scott Cameron	Val Konoplev	February 5, 2020	January 21, 2022	1203a (303a) 1203b (303b)
141	3	"George Loves a Parade"	Scott Heming	Kay Donmyer	Clint Taylor	February 5, 2020	January 21, 2022	1203a (303a) 1203b (303b)
"Leaky Faucet": George tries to stop the leak in the kitchen sink. "George Loves a Parade": Howie the Hog misses out on riding in the big parade, so George, Allie, and Bill put on a parade for him.
142	4	"Antonio the Avocado"	Andrei Svislotski	Sherri Stoner	Zhenia Delioussine	February 6, 2020	January 28, 2022	1204a (304a) 1204b (304b)
142	4	"Curious Clouds"	Scott Heming	Deanna Oliver	Kelly James	February 6, 2020	January 28, 2022	1204a (304a) 1204b (304b)
"Antonio the Avocado": George learns about avocados. "Curious Clouds": George learns about the Man's love for clouds, so he tries to find a cloud.
143	5	"Cuckoo Cockatoo"	Andrei Svislotski	Melissa Berg	Vitaly Shafirov	February 7, 2020	February 4, 2022	1205a (305a) 1205b (305b)
143	5	"A Bunch of Balooney"	Scott Heming	Kay Donmyer	Calvin Suggs	February 7, 2020	February 4, 2022	1205a (305a) 1205b (305b)
"Cuckoo Cockatoo": George meets Sunny the Cockatoo and learns how smart he is. "A Bunch of Balooney": George learns how helium balloons float up and other float down.
144	6	"George and the Guide Dog"	Andrei Svislotski	Jeff Goode	Joseph Chang	February 10, 2020	February 11, 2022	1206a (306a) 1206b (306b)
144	6	"Whatever Floats Your Boat"	Scott Heming	Peter Ferland	Clint Taylor	February 10, 2020	February 11, 2022	1206a (306a) 1206b (306b)
"George and the Guide Dog": George meets a Service Dog and her friend. "Whatever Floats Your Boat": George wants to float supplies downstream to Bill who is camping out, but he doesn't have a boat.
145	7	"George's Dark Day"	Andrei Svislotski	Melissa Berg	Zhenia Delioussine	February 11, 2020	February 18, 2022	1207a (307a) 1207b (307b)
145	7	"Leaf Raker"	Scott Heming	Peter K. Hirsch	Kelly James	February 11, 2020	February 18, 2022	1207a (307a) 1207b (307b)
"George's Dark Day": George and the Man get to see the Solar Eclipse. "Leaf Raker": Bill teaches George how to rake leaves.
146	8	"Blowin' in the Wind"	Andrei Svislotski	P. Kevin Strader	Vitaly Shafirov	February 12, 2020	February 25, 2022	1208a (308a) 1208b (308b)
146	8	"George's Noisy New Neighbor"	Scott Heming	Sarah Katin and Nakia Trower Shuman	Joseph Chang	February 12, 2020	February 25, 2022	1208a (308a) 1208b (308b)
"Blowin' in the Wind": In a game of hide and seek, Charkie keeps finding George no matter how hard he hides. "George's Noisy New Neighbor": George gets woken up by a woodpecker and learns that the bird has occupied Jumpy's tree.
147	9	"Jurassic George"	Andrei Svislotski and Scott Heming	Raye Lankford and Ken Scarborough	Calvin Suggs and Clint Taylor	February 13, 2020	March 4, 2022	1209 (309)
George meets a baby dinosaur at the new dinosaur exhibit at the museum. Note: This is a double-length episode.
148	10	"Duck Helper George"	Andrei Svislotski	Kathy Waugh	Zhenia Delioussine	February 14, 2020	March 11, 2022	1210a (310a) 1210b (310b)
148	10	"George's New Home"	Scott Heming	Melissa Berg	Kelly James	February 14, 2020	March 11, 2022	1210a (310a) 1210b (310b)
"Duck Helper George": George tries to help a family of ducklings return home. "George's New Home": George learns about animals who live in shells and makes a shell home of his own.
149	11	"George Gets the Hiccups"	Andrei Svislotski	Scott Cameron and Diane Kredensor	Vitaly Shafirov	February 17, 2020	March 18, 2022	1211a (311a) (AB336) 1211b (311b) (AB337)
149	11	"The Trash Cam"	Scott Heming	Peter Ferland	Joseph Chang	February 17, 2020	March 18, 2022	1211a (311a) (AB336) 1211b (311b) (AB337)
"George Gets the Hiccups": George tries to get rid of his hiccups. "The Trash Cam": Using the skills of a professional wildlife videographer, George figures out who has been digging in his trash can.
150	12	"Lost & Found"	Andrei Svislotski	Deanna Oliver	Calvin Suggs and Vitaly Shafirov	February 18, 2020	March 25, 2022	1212a (312a) 1212b (312b)
150	12	"George in His Own Backyard"	Scott Heming	Lazar Saric	Clint Taylor	February 18, 2020	March 25, 2022	1212a (312a) 1212b (312b)
"Lost & Found": George and Hundley return a stockpile of "Lost and Found" items that the latter found in the lobby. "George in His Own Backyard": George's prized marble goes missing.
151	13	"Window Dressing"	Andrei Svislotski	Angela Salt	Zhenia Delioussine	February 19, 2020	April 1, 2022	1213a (313a) 1213b (313b)
151	13	"The Great Treehouse Hoist"	Scott Heming	Kay Donmyer	Kelly James	February 19, 2020	April 1, 2022	1213a (313a) 1213b (313b)
"Window Dressing": George discovers a recreated room set from his new book in the window of Mabel's department store. "The Great Treehouse Hoist": George and Allie devise a system to get supplies up to the tree house.
152	14	"George Saves a Tree"	Andrei Svislotski	Jeff Goode	Vitaly Shafirov	February 20, 2020	April 8, 2022	1202a (302a) 1202b (302b)
152	14	"Ball Trouble"	Scott Heming	Diane Kredensor and Scott Cameron	Joseph Chang	February 20, 2020	April 8, 2022	1202a (302a) 1202b (302b)
"George Saves a Tree": George throws a party for the beloved apple tree when he learns that Mr. Glass plans to move the tree. "Ball Trouble": George tries to patch a hole in his bouncy ball when it keeps deflating.
153	15	"Tyrannosaurus Wrench"	Andrei Svislotski	Jeff Goode	Kathy Carr	February 21, 2020	April 15, 2022	1215a (315a) (AB344) 1215b (315b) (AB345)
153	15	"Bingo Monkey"	Scott Heming	Melissa Berg	Julia Briemle	February 21, 2020	April 15, 2022	1215a (315a) (AB344) 1215b (315b) (AB345)
"Tyrannosaurus Wrench": George and Marco learn about paleontology. "Bingo Monkey": When George's nature hike with Bill prevents him from playing Bingo, he creates his own unique version of the game for their adventure.

=== Season 13 (2020) ===
No. overall	No. in season	Title	Directed by	Written by	Storyboard by	Original release date	US air date	Prod. code
154	1	"Camp George"	Andrei Svislotski	Melissa Berg	Zhenia Delioussine	July 15, 2020	June 3, 2022	1301a (AB401a) 1301b (AB401b)
154	1	"Hoop Dupe"	Scott Heming	Diane Kredensor and Scott Cameron	Kelly James	July 15, 2020	June 3, 2022	1301a (AB401a) 1301b (AB401b)
"Camp George": George and Marco throw a summer camp party. "Hoop Dupe": George learns the musical quality of hula hoops.
155	2	"A Good Yarn"	Scott Heming	Deanna Oliver	Joseph Chang	July 15, 2020	June 10, 2022	1302a (AB402a) 1302b (AB402b)
155	2	"Snow Monkey"	Andrei Svislotski	Chuck Tately	Jena Anderson	July 15, 2020	June 10, 2022	1302a (AB402a) 1302b (AB402b)
"A Good Yarn": George fixes Mrs. Renkins' new scarf. "Snow Monkey": The Man and George go to the mountains for a cabin vacation.
156	3	"Basic Training"	Scott Heming	Chuck Tately	Julia Briemle	July 15, 2020	June 17, 2022	1303a (AB403a) 1303b (AB403b)
156	3	"A Winder-er Wonderland (AKA A Wind-er Wonderland)"	Andrei Svislotski	Kay Donmyer	Kathy Carr	July 15, 2020	June 17, 2022	1303a (AB403a) 1303b (AB403b)
"Basic Training": George plays with Mr. Quint's set of model trains. "A Winder-er Wonderland (AKA A Wind-er Wonderland)": George visits Professor Wise's wind farm and learns about harnessing wind energy.
157	4	"Twain a Fence and Hard Place"	Scott Heming	Kay Donmyer	Kelly James	July 15, 2020	June 24, 2022	1304a (AB404a) 1304b (AB404b)
157	4	"Loafing Around"	Andrei Svislotski	Ken Pontac	Zhenia Delioussine	July 15, 2020	June 24, 2022	1304a (AB404a) 1304b (AB404b)
"Twain a Fence and Hard Place": George helps Bill paint a fence. "Loafing Around": The Man and George work together to build homemade bread.
158	5	"Spelunky Monkey"	Andrei Svislotski	Melissa Berg	Vitaly Shafirov	July 15, 2020	July 8, 2022	1305a (AB405a) 1305b (AB405b)
158	5	"The Dive-In Movie"	Scott Heming	Chuck Tately	Joseph Chang	July 15, 2020	July 8, 2022	1305a (AB405a) 1305b (AB405b)
"Spelunky Monkey": The Man and George go spelunking. "The Dive-In Movie": George hosts an outdoor movie night with his neighborhood friends.
159	6	"Hamster"	Andrei Svislotski	Jeff Goode	Kathy Carr	December 11, 2020	July 15, 2022	1306a (AB406a) 1306b (AB406b)
159	6	"Sleepers"	Scott Heming	Christine Ecklund	Julia Briemle	December 11, 2020	July 15, 2022	1306a (AB406a) 1306b (AB406b)
"Hamster": George helps Marco take care of his new hamster. "Sleepers": George learns how to get a good night's rest.
160	7	"Bee Like Me"	Andrei Svislotski	Ken Pontac	Zhenia Delioussine	December 11, 2020	July 22, 2022	1307a (AB407a) 1307b (AB407b)
160	7	"To the Lighthouse"	Scott Heming	Angela Salt	Kelly James	December 11, 2020	July 22, 2022	1307a (AB407a) 1307b (AB407b)
"Bee Like Me": George dresses up like a bee and acts like one too. "To the Lighthouse": The Man and George explore a lighthouse during a storm.
161	8	"George's Little Library"	Scott Heming	Jeff Goode	Joseph Chang	December 11, 2020	July 29, 2022	1308a (AB408a) 1308b (AB408b)
161	8	"Monkeys of a Feather"	Andrei Svislotski	Cooper Sweeney	Vitaly Shafirov	December 11, 2020	July 29, 2022	1308a (AB408a) 1308b (AB408b)
"George's Little Library": George makes a little library to share books. "Monkeys of a Feather": George helps Compass fly south for the winter.
162	9	"Plastics"	Andrei Svislotski	Deanna Oliver	Kathy Carr	December 11, 2020	August 5, 2022	1309a (AB409a) 1309b (AB409b)
162	9	"Hide and Go Sheep"	Scott Heming	Chuck Tately	Julia Briemle	December 11, 2020	August 5, 2022	1309a (AB409a) 1309b (AB409b)
"Plastics": George learns how to reduce, reuse and recycle plastic. "Hide and Go Sheep": George, Bill, and Allie play hide-and-seek.
164	10	"Water Ski-Daddle"	Scott Heming	Kay Donmyer	Joseph Chang	December 11, 2020	August 19, 2022	1311a (AB411a) 1311b (AB411b)
164	10	"The Greenhouse Effect"	Andrei Svislotski	Chuck Tately	Vitaly Shafirov	December 11, 2020	August 19, 2022	1311a (AB411a) 1311b (AB411b)
"Water Ski-Daddle": George and Allie try to water ski in a kiddie pool. "The Greenhouse Effect": George creates a garden to help Chef Pisghetti.
165	11	"Raisins!"	Scott Heming	Deanna Oliver	Julia Briemle	December 11, 2020	August 26, 2022	1312a (AB412a) 1312b (AB412b)
165	11	"A Bedtime Story for Compass"	Andrei Svislotski	Kay Donmyer	Kathy Carr	December 11, 2020	August 26, 2022	1312a (AB412a) 1312b (AB412b)
"Raisins!": George dries grapes in the sun to create raisins. "A Bedtime Story for Compass": George writes a story to help Compass go to sleep.
166	12	"Mush!"	Scott Heming	Chuck Tately	Kelly James	December 11, 2020	August 12, 2022	1313a (AB413a) 1313b (AB413b)
166	12	"Puppets in the Park"	Andrei Svislotski	Angela Salt	Zhenia Delioussine	December 11, 2020	August 12, 2022	1313a (AB413a) 1313b (AB413b)
"Mush!": George learns how to steer a dogsled team to rescue the Man. "Puppets in the Park": George discovers giant puppets.
163	13	"Prints of a Monkey"	Scott Heming	John Loy	Kelly James	December 11, 2020	January 19, 2024	1310a (AB410a) 1310b (AB410b)
163	13	"Lobby Sale"	Andrei Svislotski	Kay Donmyer	Vitaly Shafirov	December 11, 2020	January 19, 2024	1310a (AB410a) 1310b (AB410b)
"Prints of a Monkey": George uses fingerprints to find a missing museum artifact. "Lobby Sale": George creates his own rummage sale.
167	14	"Hot Dog!"	Scott Heming	Melissa Berg	Joseph Chang	December 11, 2020	January 26, 2024	1314a (AB414a) 1314b (AB414b)
167	14	"George and the Beat"	Andrei Svislotski	Christine Ecklund	Zhenia Delioussine	December 11, 2020	January 26, 2024	1314a (AB414a) 1314b (AB414b)
"Hot Dog!": George builds Hundley an ocean raft. "George and the Beat": George learns to play the drums for the Man's birthday party.
168	15	"Swimspiration"	Scott Heming	Kay Donmyer	Julia Briemle	December 11, 2020	February 2, 2024	1315a (AB415a) 1315b (AB415b)
168	15	"Museum of George"	Andrei Svislotski	Jeff Goode	Kathy Carr	December 11, 2020	February 2, 2024	1315a (AB415a) 1315b (AB415b)
"Swimspiration": George learns about how different animals swim. "Museum of George": George gets inspired to make his own museum.

=== Season 14 (2021) ===
No. overall	No. in season	Title	Directed by	Written by	Storyboard by	Original release date	US air date	Prod. code
169	1	"George Makes Pizza"	Andrei Svislotski	Jeff Goode	Vitaly Shafirov	October 21, 2021	November 4, 2022	1401a 1401b
169	1	"Ladybugs!"	Scott Heming	Deanna Oliver	Kathy Carr	October 21, 2021	November 4, 2022	1401a 1401b
"George Makes Pizza": George competes in a make-your-own-pizza party. "Ladybugs!": George helps with a vegetable garden.
170	2	"A Pig, A Pup, and a Monkey"	Scott Heming	Christine Ecklund	Joseph Chang	October 21, 2021	November 11, 2022	1402a 1402b
170	2	"Y'Orchid-ing Me?"	Andrei Svislotski	Sindy Boveda Spackman	Zhenia Delioussine	October 21, 2021	November 11, 2022	1402a 1402b
"A Pig, A Pup, and a Monkey": George and Hamilton dogsit a puppy named Peaches. "Y'Orchid-ing Me?": George takes care of his orchid.
171	3	"Monkey Hill"	Andrei Svislotski	Melissa Berg	Kelly James	October 21, 2021	November 18, 2022	1403a (AB603a) 1403b (AB603b)
171	3	"Ready, Set, Flamin-go!"	Scott Heming	Kay Donmyer	Julia Briemle	October 21, 2021	November 18, 2022	1403a (AB603a) 1403b (AB603b)
"Monkey Hill": George and Steve sled in Endless Park. "Ready, Set, Flamin-go!": George embarks on a flock-counting expedition in the tropics.
172	4	"George of the Desert"	Andrei Svislotski	Mark Purdy	Vitaly Shafirov	October 21, 2021	November 25, 2022	1404a (AB604a) 1404b (AB604b)
172	4	"The Texture Game"	Scott Heming	Kay Donmyer	Kathy Carr	October 21, 2021	November 25, 2022	1404a (AB604a) 1404b (AB604b)
"George of the Desert": George hikes in the desert with his friends. "The Texture Game": George discovers textures.
173	5	"The Sounds of George"	Andrei Svislotski	Christine Ecklund	Zhenia Delioussine	October 21, 2021	December 2, 2022	1405a (AB611a) 1405b (AB611b)
173	5	"Better Butterflying"	Scott Heming	Kay Donmyer	Joseph Chang	October 21, 2021	December 2, 2022	1405a (AB611a) 1405b (AB611b)
"The Sounds of George": George helps Chef Pisghetti relax. "Better Butterflying": George helps Mrs. Quint with her butterfly tagging project.
174	6	"The Tale of the Frightening Flapjacks"	Andrei Svislotski	Cooper Sweeney	Joseph Chang	October 21, 2021	October 14, 2022	1406a (AB606a) 1406b (AB606b)
174	6	"Happy Yello-Ween"	Scott Heming	Mark Purdy	Julia Briemle	October 21, 2021	October 14, 2022	1406a (AB606a) 1406b (AB606b)
"The Tale of the Frightening Flapjacks": George and the Man with the Yellow Hat make a jack-o-lantern. "Happy Yello-Ween": George and Allie trick-or-treat.
175	7	"Dolphin with the Yellow Hat"	Scott Heming	Chuck Tately	Kathy Carr	October 21, 2021	December 9, 2022	1407a (AB607a) 1407b (AB607b)
175	7	"Dog's Day Off"	Andrei Svislotski	Jeff Goode	Vitaly Shafirov	October 21, 2021	December 9, 2022	1407a (AB607a) 1407b (AB607b)
"Dolphin with the Yellow Hat": Since Allie has gone home, George loses the Man with the Yellow Hat's hat. "Dog's Day Off": George helps Hundley build his confidence.
176	8	"Mule Feathers"	Scott Heming	Deanna Oliver	Joseph Chang	October 21, 2021	December 16, 2022	1408a (AB608a) 1408b (AB608b)
176	8	"George Serves It Up"	Andrei Svislotski	Melissa Berg	Zhenia Delioussine	October 21, 2021	December 16, 2022	1408a (AB608a) 1408b (AB608b)
"Mule Feathers": George and the Man with the Yellow Hat farm-sit for the Renkins. "George Serves It Up": George helps Chef Pisghetti around his restaurant.
177	9	"Monkey Parade"	Andrei Svislotski	Ken Scarborough	Kelly James	October 21, 2021	December 23, 2022	1409a (AB609a) 1409b (AB609b)
177	9	"George and Allie's Pet Hotel"	Scott Heming	Melissa Berg	Julia Briemle	October 21, 2021	December 23, 2022	1409a (AB609a) 1409b (AB609b)
"Monkey Parade": George helps Big John fix his parade float. "George and Allie's Pet Hotel": George finds their neighbor's house turned into a hotel.
178	10	"George in the Doghouse"	Scott Heming	Bart Coughlin	Kathy Carr	October 21, 2021	December 30, 2022	1410a (AB610a) 1410b (AB610b)
178	10	"Time Is Puzzling"	Andrei Svislotski	Kay Donmyer	Vitaly Shafirov	October 21, 2021	December 30, 2022	1410a (AB610a) 1410b (AB610b)
"George in the Doghouse": George makes Hundley a doghouse in the yard. "Time is Puzzling": George learns how to pass the time when he can't wait for Betsy's birthday party.
179	11	"Aiming for the Stars"	Scott Heming	Kay Donmyer	Kelly James	October 21, 2021	January 6, 2023	1411a (AB612a) 1411b (AB612b)
179	11	"George vs. the Volcano"	Andrei Svislotski	Bart Coughlin	Zhenia Delioussine	October 21, 2021	January 6, 2023	1411a (AB612a) 1411b (AB612b)
"Aiming for the Stars": George learns about constellations. "George vs. the Volcano": George helps Marco build a volcano for show-and-tell at school.
180	12	"In Case of Emergency"	Andrei Svislotski	Deanna Oliver	Zhenia Delioussine	October 21, 2021	January 13, 2023	1412a (AB614a) 1412b (AB614b)
180	12	"George's BFF"	Andrei Svislotski	Peter Ferland	Kelly James	October 21, 2021	January 13, 2023	1412a (AB614a) 1412b (AB614b)
"In Case of Emergency": George is dying to push an emergency button. "George's BFF": George spends the night at a prairie nature center.
181	13	"George's Geode Jamboree"	Andrei Svislotski	Cooper Sweeney	Vitaly Shafirov	October 21, 2021	January 20, 2023	1413a (AB613a) 1413b (AB613b)
181	13	"The Man with the Yellow Hair"	Scott Heming	Melissa Berg	Kathy Carr	October 21, 2021	January 20, 2023	1413a (AB613a) 1413b (AB613b)
"George's Geode Jamboree": George starts his rock collection. "The Man with the Yellow Hair": George learns a barber's special techniques.
182	14	"The Great Train Birthday"	Scott Heming	Matt Hoverman	Joseph Chang and Julia Briemle	October 21, 2021	January 27, 2023	1414 (AB605)
"The Great Train Birthday": George and Hundley go on an overnight train trip that coincides with George's birthday.
183	15	"George's Flying Disc Debacle"	Scott Heming	Cooper Sweeney	Julia Briemle	October 21, 2021	February 3, 2023	1415a (AB615a) 1415b (AB615b)
183	15	"Hundley's Truffle Trouble"	Andrei Svislotski	Chuck Tately	Rafael Rosado	October 21, 2021	February 3, 2023	1415a (AB615a) 1415b (AB615b)
"George's Flying Disc Debacle": George is fascinated by Bill's flying disc. "Hundley's Truffle Trouble": Hundley mistakenly eats some gourmet truffles.

=== Season 15 (2022) ===
No. overall	No. in season	Title	Directed by	Written by	Storyboard by	Original release date	US air date	Prod. code
184	1	"George Gets Slimed"	Andrei Svislotski	Chuck Tately	Vitaly Shafirov	March 17, 2022	October 6, 2023	1501a 1501b
184	1	"Seesaw Saturday"	Scott Heming	Kay Donmyer	Kathy Carr	March 17, 2022	October 6, 2023	1501a 1501b
"George Gets Slimed": George makes homemade slime like a slug. "Seesaw Saturday": George and Allie find a tippy thing on the Renkins farm.
185	2	"Curious George and the Lost Puppy"	Andrei Svislotski	Melissa Berg	Rafael Rosado	March 17, 2022	October 13, 2023	1502a 1502b
185	2	"Gnocchi's Purr-fect Day"	Andrei Svislotski	Cooper Sweeney	Zhenia Delioussine	March 17, 2022	October 13, 2023	1502a 1502b
"Curious George and the Lost Puppy": George helps watch the puppies at an adoption fair, but one escapes. "Gnocchi's Purr-fect Day": George helps Gnocchi after she injured herself.
186	3	"A Knight to Remember"	Scott Heming	Cooper Sweeney and Sherri Stoner	Joseph Chang and Julia Briemle	March 17, 2022	October 20, 2023	1503
"A Knight to Remember": George spends the day at a Renaissance fair.
187	4	"Locked Out"	Andrei Svislotski	Melissa Berg	Vitaly Shafirov	March 17, 2022	October 27, 2023	1504a 1504b
187	4	"Bark Suit"	Scott Heming	Deanna Oliver	Kathy Carr	March 17, 2022	October 27, 2023	1504a 1504b
"Locked Out": George is locked out and needs a key. "Bark Suit": George collects bark and a beetle who needs to be returned.
188	5	"Count on George to Deliver"	Scott Heming	Kay Donmyer	Joseph Chang	March 17, 2022	November 3, 2023	1505a 1505b
188	5	"The Baby Elephant"	Andrei Svislotski	Peter Ferland	Zhenia Delioussine	March 17, 2022	November 3, 2023	1505a 1505b
"Count on George to Deliver": While delivering boxes of Sprouts bars, George loses one. "The Baby Elephant": George cares for a baby elephant in Kenya.
189	6	"Leaf it to George"	Andrei Svislotski	Mark Purdy	Zhenia Delioussine	March 17, 2022	November 10, 2023	1506a 1506b
189	6	"Cutting-Hedge Technology"	Scott Heming	Peter Ferland	Joseph Chang	March 17, 2022	November 10, 2023	1506a 1506b
"Leaf it to George": George and Allie worry that snow will ruin their campout. "Cutting-Hedge Technology": George creates his own topiary garden.
190	7	"Bonus Day"	Andrei Svislotski	Melissa Berg	Vitaly Shafirov	March 17, 2022	November 17, 2023	1507a 1507b
190	7	"Understudy George"	Scott Heming	Christine Ecklund	Kathy Carr	March 17, 2022	November 17, 2023	1507a 1507b
"Bonus Day": George has a busy day planned on leap year. "Understudy George": George is an understudy and wants to play all the roles.
191	8	"Hawai’i"	Scott Heming	Jeff Goode	Joseph Chang and Julia Briemle	March 17, 2022	November 24, 2023	1508
"Hawai’i": George visits Hawaii and gets lost.
192	9	"Sneaky Shadow"	Andrei Svislotski	Cooper Sweeney	Rafael Rosado	March 17, 2022	December 1, 2023	1509a (AB709a) 1509b (AB709b)
192	9	"Peddlers!"	Andrei Svislotski	Deanna Oliver	Zhenia Delioussine	March 17, 2022	December 1, 2023	1509a (AB709a) 1509b (AB709b)
"Sneaky Shadow": George uses shadow puppets to help Allie. "Peddlers!": Old-fashioned gadgets inspire George to make his own.
193	10	"Chef Rides a Bike"	Andrei Svislotski	Melissa Berg	Vitaly Shafirov	March 17, 2022	December 8, 2023	1510a (AB710a) 1510b (AB710b)
193	10	"Face Painting"	Scott Heming	Kay Donmyer	Kathy Carr	March 17, 2022	December 8, 2023	1510a (AB710a) 1510b (AB710b)
"Chef Rides a Bike": Chef learns how to ride a bike for a birthday surprise. "Face Painting": George paints a big portrait on his house.
194	11	"Monkey Mechanic"	Andrei Svislotski	Melissa Berg	Rafael Rosado	March 17, 2022	December 15, 2023	1511a (AB711a) 1511b (AB711b)
194	11	"See Horses and Wee Horses"	Scott Heming	Peter Ferland	Julia Briemle	March 17, 2022	December 15, 2023	1511a (AB711a) 1511b (AB711b)
"Monkey Mechanic": Mechanic George helps Marco and Lorelai. "See Horses and Wee Horses": Uncle Tam shares his favorite animal, the seahorse.
195	12	"George Bowls a Hole in One"	Andrei Svislotski	Chuck Tately	Rafael Rosado	March 17, 2022	December 22, 2023	1512a (AB712a) 1512b (AB712b)
195	12	"Virtuoso George"	Scott Heming	Kay Donmyer	Julia Briemle	March 17, 2022	December 22, 2023	1512a (AB712a) 1512b (AB712b)
"George Bowls a Hole in One": George, Steve and Betsy combine golf and bowling. "Virtuoso George": George tries to build a piano.
196	13	"Country in the City"	Andrei Svislotski	Deanna Oliver	Vitaly Shafirov	March 17, 2022	December 29, 2023	1513a (AB713a) 1513b (AB713b)
196	13	"Stinky Cheese"	Scott Heming	Deanna Oliver	Kathy Carr	March 17, 2022	December 29, 2023	1513a (AB713a) 1513b (AB713b)
"Country in the City": George brings the country to the city. "Stinky Cheese": George makes his own stinky cheese.
197	14	"George in the Rain"	Scott Heming	Christine Ecklund	Joseph Chang	March 17, 2022	January 5, 2024	1514a (AB714a) 1514b (AB714b)
197	14	"George's Pigeon Predicament"	Andrei Svislotski	Cooper Sweeney	Zhenia Delioussine	March 17, 2022	January 5, 2024	1514a (AB714a) 1514b (AB714b)
"George in the Rain": George learns about rain's journey from sky to faucet. "George's Pigeon Predicament": George meets a winged creature in the park.
198	15	"Sloth"	Scott Heming	Jeff Goode	Julia Briemle	March 17, 2022	January 12, 2024	1515a (AB715a) 1515b (AB715b)
198	15	"Saved by the Bells"	Andrei Svislotski	Chuck Tately	Rafael Rosado	March 17, 2022	January 12, 2024	1515a (AB715a) 1515b (AB715b)
"Sloth": George visits a rainforest and helps a baby sloth find its mama. "Saved by the Bells": George learns how big bells ring.

== Specials ==
Title	Directed by	Written by	Storyboard by	Original release date
"A Very Monkey Christmas"	Scott Heming, Cathy Malkasian and Jeff McGrath	Joe Fallon	Llyn Hunter, Rafael Rosado, Pablo Solis, Zhenia Delioussine, Andrei Svitslotski and Bert Ring	November 25, 2009
It is Christmas time but George and The Man with the Yellow Hat have a problem. They must both find out what each other wants for Christmas. George draws out his Christmas list with a simple picture but The Man cannot seem to figure out what it is, nor can anyone else to whom he shows it, like The Doorman or Chef Pisghetti. The Man tells George to just surprise him and George decides to make him a present, although he cannot decide what to make. Meanwhile, Betsy tries to write her Aunt Margaret a new Christmas Carol but everything about Christmas, from snow to Santa, already has a song.
"Curious George Swings Into Spring"	Scott Heming and Andrei Svislotski	Joe Fallon	Llyn Hunter, Michael Kenny, Cathy Malkasian, Max Martinez, Frank Marino and David Schwartz	April 22, 2013
The Man with the Yellow Hat is sure that George has spring fever, and he takes George to the park to experience all the wonders of spring. George is so excited about spring that he wants Hundley to have spring fever, too, but Hundley and the Doorman are busy trying to win the Mayor's spring cleaning prize. When a broken water pipe floods the building, Hundley has to stay with George in the country, and George tries to make sure Hundley enjoys spring, too.
"A Halloween Boofest"	Scott Heming and Andrei Svislotski	Joe Fallon	Jim Beihold, Llyn Hunter, Cathy Malkasian, Eric McConnell, Bert Ring and Rafael Rosado	October 28, 2013
George is excited about celebrating his first Halloween in the country. Bill tells George and Allie a spooky story about a scarecrow called "No Noggin" who haunts the countryside on Halloween, and kicks people's hats. George and Allie want to prove No Noggin is real by catching him in the act and taking his picture. Also, George tries to come up with a Halloween costume to win the costume contest at the town Boo Festival.
