= Curious George (disambiguation) =

Curious George is the main character of a series of children's books.

Curious George may also refer to:

== Based on the book series ==
- Curious George (book), the first Curious George book
- Curious George (franchise)
- Curious George (film), 2006
- Curious George (1984 film), stop-motion short
- Curious George (TV series), television series shown from 2006
- Curious George (1982 TV series), short-form television series from the '80s
- Curious George (video game)

== Inspired by the monkey ==
- Comedian George Carlin referring to himself as Curious George in his Complaints and Grievances album
- Curious George Brigade, an anarchist collective in New York City
