= Curious George (franchise) =

Media series

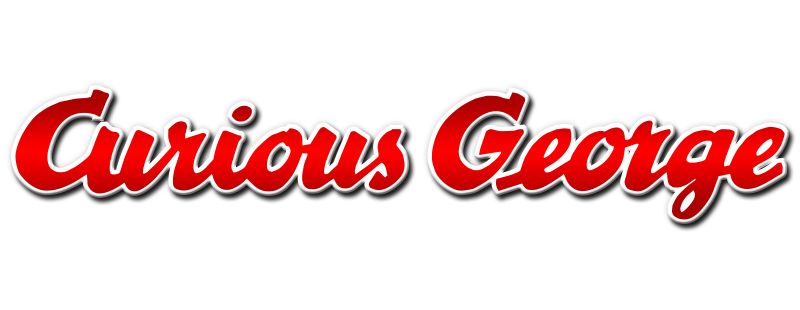
- Official franchise logo
- Directed by: Matthew O'Callaghan (1); Norton Virgien (2); Phil Weinstein (3); Doug Murphy (4, 6); Michael LaBash (5)
- Written by: Ken Kaufman (1); Mike Werb (1); Chuck Tately (2–3); Darrell Rooney (2)
- Based on: Curious George by Margret Rey; H.A. Rey
- Produced by: Ron Howard (1); David Kirschner (1); Jon Shapiro (1); Share Stallings (2–3); Deirdre Brenner (4–6)
- Starring: Frank Welker; Jeff Bennett
- Music by: Heitor Pereira (1–3); Jack Johnson (1); Carbon Leaf (2); Germaine Franco (4–5); Dara Taylor (6)
- Production companies: Universal Animation Studios; Imagine Entertainment; A. Film A/S (1); Mercury Filmworks (1); Toon City Animation (1–2); Tycoon Animation (3); BV Animation Studio (3); Atomic Cartoons (4–6); Universal 1440 Entertainment (3–6)
- Distributed by: Universal Pictures (1); Universal Pictures Home Entertainment (2–6); NBCUniversal Syndication Studios (TV airings)
- Country: United States
- Language: English

Curious George is an American media franchise based on the book series of the same name by H. A. Rey and Margret Rey. The series began with the theatrical release of the first film in 2006. The film's success led it to receiving direct-to-video sequels, a television series (which aired three specials during its run) as well as a video game.

It stars a tailless monkey by the name George and his owner known as the Man with the Yellow Hat, or Ted as he is named in the films.

== Films ==
=== Curious George (2006) ===
Curious George is the first film in the Curious George franchise. In an attempt to save the Bloomsberry Museum, a museum director named Ted goes to Africa to find a forty-foot idol, while encountering a monkey he later names George, who goes onto the boat to America with Ted, to Ted's apartment, causing a strict doorman named Ivan to go furious. After plenty of mishap, it is eventually George who saved the museum. It was released in theaters on February 10, 2006.

=== Curious George 2: Follow That Monkey! (2009) ===
Curious George 2: Follow That Monkey! is the second film in the Curious George franchise. It follows George befriending an elephant at a magic show named Kayla. After learning Kayla has parents in California, George makes it him and Ted's mission to help reunite her with her family. Meanwhile Kayla's owner, Mr. Piccadilly, enlists the Head of Security, Danno Wolfe, to track George, Kayla and Ted down. The film received a theatrical release in Denmark, Sweden, and Iceland on July 10, 2009, and was released direct-to-video in other territories on March 2, 2010.

=== Curious George 3: Back to the Jungle (2015) ===
Curious George 3: Back to the Jungle is the third film in the Curious George franchise. In the film, George is asked to take part in a special mission to space, but a mishap during the journey lands him back to the jungle where he originally came from. It was released on DVD on June 23, 2015. This is the second film in the franchise to not receive a theatrical release, and the last to be traditionally-animated, as further films would utilize flash animation. Directed by Phil Weinstein, Frank Welker and Jeff Bennett reprise their roles from the previous film and are joined by John Goodman, Alexander Polinsky, Dee Bradley Baker, Gwendoline Yeo, Henry Guybit and Angela Bassett. Curious George 3: Back to the Jungle was released in the United States on June 23, 2015. It was released as a direct-to-DVD movie by Universal Pictures Home Entertainment. The movie was also later aired on PBS KIDS in August 2015.

=== Curious George: Royal Monkey (2019) ===
Curious George: Royal Monkey is the fourth film in the Curious George franchise. It focuses on George as he gets mixed up with a royal monkey named Phillippe. It was released on DVD on September 10, 2019.

=== Curious George: Go West, Go Wild (2020) ===
Curious George: Go West, Go Wild is the fifth film in the Curious George franchise. The film features George and Ted traveling to Cousin Ginny's farm for a relaxing vacation, but their fun is cut short when a herd of animals escape and run loose. It was released exclusively on Peacock on September 8, 2020, and via digital and DVD on December 15, 2020.

=== Curious George: Cape Ahoy (2021) ===
Curious George: Cape Ahoy is the sixth film in the Curious George franchise. George and Ted go on vacation to the town of Coddington with a small house owned by a treasure lover, Captain Elmer to find ancient treasure buried somewhere in his land or the beaches along with a baby seal making his way into the adventure with an endangered seal mom. There is also the legend of Captain TrumpetTooter and his abandoned, still intact, pirate ship as well as Getrude St. John, a Captain TrumpetTooter legend loving scientist and Emma, the niece of Captain Elmer who is an animal rescue scientist and would do anything to rescue the animals, including seals. It was released on Peacock on September 30, 2021.

== Television series ==
=== Curious George (2006–2022) ===
The series explores themes of learning, forgiveness and playful curiosity, and follows George, who is a sweet but trouble making African monkey. It premiered on September 4, 2006 and its most recent episodes aired on March 17, 2022.

== Reception ==
=== Box office performance ===
Title	Release date (United States)	Budget	Box office gross				Box office ranking		Ref(s)
Title	Release date (United States)	Budget	Opening weekend (North America)	North America	Other territories	Worldwide	All time North America	All time worldwide	Ref(s)
Curious George	February 10, 2006	$50 million	$14,703,405	$58,360,760	$11,505,164	$69,865,924	#1,266	—N/a	
Curious George 2: Follow That Monkey!	November 18, 2009	—N/a			$2,240,069	$2,240,069	—N/a		
Curious George 3: Back to the Jungle	July 23, 2015	—N/a			$1,313,940	$1,313,940	—N/a		
Curious George: Royal Monkey	September 10, 2019	—N/a							
Curious George: Go West, Go Wild	September 8, 2020	—N/a							
Curious George: Cape Ahoy	September 30, 2021	—N/a							
Totals	—N/a	$50 million	$14,703,405	$58,360,760	$15,059,173	$73,419,933	—N/a		

=== Critical and public response ===
Film	Critical		Public
Film	Rotten Tomatoes	Metacritic	CinemaScore
Curious George	70% (107 reviews)	62 (28 reviews)	A−
Curious George 2: Follow That Monkey!	TBA (1 review)	—N/a	—N/a
Curious George 3: Back to the Jungle	TBA (1 review)	—N/a	—N/a
Curious George: Royal Monkey	TBA (1 review)	—N/a	—N/a
Curious George: Go West, Go Wild	TBA (0 review)	—N/a	—N/a
Curious George: Cape Ahoy	TBA (1 review)	—N/a	—N/a

== Cast and characters ==
List indicators

This section includes characters who will appear or have appeared in the franchise.

- An empty grey cell indicates the character was not in the film, or that the character's official presence has not yet been confirmed.
- ^{U} indicates an uncredited appearance.
- ^{S} indicates an appearance as a character's singing voice.

Character	Films						Television series
Character	Curious George	Curious George 2: Follow That Monkey!	Curious George 3: Back to the Jungle	Curious George: Royal Monkey	Curious George: Go West, Go Wild	Curious George: Cape Ahoy	Curious George
George	Frank Welker	Frank Welker	Frank Welker	Frank Welker	Frank Welker	Frank Welker	Frank Welker
The Man with the Yellow Hat Ted Shackleford	Will Ferrell	Jeff Bennett	Jeff Bennett	Jeff Bennett	Jeff Bennett	Jeff Bennett	Jeff Bennett Matt Kaminsky^{S}^{U}
Mr. Bloomsberry	Dick Van Dyke	Fred Tatasciore					
Margaret "Maggie" Dunlop	Drew Barrymore	Nickie Bryar					
Junior Bloomsberry	David Cross	Silent cameo					
Ivan	Ed O'Ross	Ed O'Ross		Ed O'Ross			
Ms. Plushbottom	Joan Plowright						
Clovis	Eugene Levy						
Edu	Michael Chinyamurindi						
Kayla	Deleted scene	Jeff McNeal					
Danno Wolfe		Jamie Kennedy					
Mr. Piccadilly		Tim Curry					
Miss Fisher		Cree Summer					
Farmer Dan		Clint Howard					
Anna		Trupti Potdukhe					
Tina		Catherine Taber					
Humbleton Stationmaster		Jerry Lewis					
Hark Hanson		Matt Lauer					
Hal Houston			John Goodman				
Dr. Naja Kulinda			Angela Bassett				
Tech Andrew			Alexander Polinsky				
Philippe				Frank Welker			
Princess Isabel lll				Daniela Bobadilla			
King Gustavo V				Philip Anthony-Rodriguez			
Ana				Eliza Jane Schneider			
El Fuego				Dee Bradley Baker			
Fernando				Dee Bradley Baker			
Mayor				Mick Wingert			
Doris				Adrienne C. Moore			
Emmett					Max Mittelman		
Sadie					Dee Bradley Baker		
Ricochet					Dee Bradley Baker		
Billy					Dee Bradley Baker		
Spittoon					Dee Bradley Baker		
Frick					Dee Bradley Baker		
Frack					Dee Bradley Baker		
Frank Stetson					Phil Morris		
Cousin Ginny					April Stewart		
Ginny's Mom					Adrienne Barbeau		
Captain Elmer						Christopher Swindle	
Emma						Hiromi Dames	
Gertrude St. John						Rita Moreno	
Seal Pup						Dee Bradley Baker	
Mama Seal						Dee Bradley Baker	
Rocco						Luka Jones	
Gwen						Kimberly D. Brookes	
Hundley							Bill Chott Lex Lang
The Doorman		Silent cameo					Bill Chott Lex Lang
Chef Pisghetti		Silent cameo					Jim Cummings
Netti							Susan Silo
Gnocchi							Debi Derryberry Dee Bradley Baker
Charkie							Kel Mitchell Rob Paulsen
Aunt Margaret		Silent cameo					Betty Jean Ward
Steve		Silent cameo					Elizabeth Daily
Betsy		Silent cameo					Grey DeLisle
Professor Wiseman		Silent cameo					Rolonda Watts
Mr. Glass							Rob Paulsen
Mr. Zoobel							Carlos Alazraqui
Compass							Rob Paulsen
Jumpy Squirrel							Jim Cummings
Allie							Lara Jill Miller
Marco							Grey DeLisle
Bill		Silent cameo					Annie Mumolo
Mr. Renkins		Silent cameo					Jeff Bennett
Mrs. Renkins		Silent cameo					Kath Soucie
Mr. Quint		Silent cameo					Jim Cummings
Mrs. Quint		Silent cameo					Candi Milo

== Crew ==
Year	Film	Director	Producer	Writer	Composer	Editor	Runtime
2006	Curious George	Matthew O'Callaghan	Ron Howard; David Kirschner; Jon Shapiro	screenplay: Ken Kaufman story: Ken Kaufman; Mike Werb	Heitor Pereira	Julie Rogers	87 minutes
2009	Curious George 2: Follow That Monkey!	Norton Virgien	Share Stallings	screenplay: Chuck Tately story: Chuck Tately; Darrell Rooney	Heitor Pereira	John Bryant	80 minutes
2015	Curious George 3: Back to the Jungle	Phil Weinstein	Share Stallings	Chuck Tately	Heitor Pereira	Roger Hinze	81 minutes
2019	Curious George: Royal Monkey	Doug Murphy	Deirdre Brenner	screenplay: Dan Wicksman; Nuria Wicksman; Cliff Ruby; Elana Lesser; Joe Stillman story: Dan Wicksman; Nuria Wicksman	Germaine Franco	Keef Bartkus; Nina Helene Hirten	86 minutes
2020	Curious George: Go West, Go Wild	Michael LaBash	Deirdre Brenner	screenplay: Jana Howington; Sherri Stoner story: Jana Howington	Germaine Franco	Luke Guidici	85 minutes
2021	Curious George: Cape Ahoy	Doug Murphy	Deirdre Brenner	screenplay: Glen Berger; Chuck Tately story: Chuck Tately	Dara Taylor	Bryan Tuck	88 minutes

== Other media ==
=== Video games ===
Video game	Date released	Game system compatible
Curious George	NA: February 1, 2006	Xbox
Curious George	NA: February 1, 2006	GameCube
Curious George	EU: November 24, 2006	GameCube
Curious George	NA: February 1, 2006	Game Boy Advance
Curious George	EU: December 1, 2006	Game Boy Advance
Curious George	AU: December 14, 2006	Game Boy Advance
Curious George	NA: February 1, 2006	PlayStation 2
Curious George	EU: December 1, 2006	PlayStation 2
Curious George	AU: December 14, 2007	PlayStation 2
Curious George	NA: February 1, 2006	Microsoft Windows
