= Curious George (1982 TV series) =

- Genre: Children's
- Based on: Curious George by H. A. Rey and Margret Rey
- Developed by: Alan Shalleck; Margret Rey
- Directed by: Alan Shalleck
- Narrated by: Jack Duffy
- Composers: Paul Baillargeon; Dean Morgan
- Countries of origin: Canada; United States
- Original language: English

Production
- Producers: Alan Shalleck; David J. Patterson
- Editor: Diann Ilnicki
- Production companies: Lafferty, Harwood, and Partners; Milktrain Productions; Telescene Productions; Atkinson Film-Arts

Original release
- Network: Nickelodeon
- Release: 1982

Related
- Curious George (TV series)

Curious George is a 1982 animated television series produced by Alan Shalleck, along with the co-creator of the Curious George books, Margret Rey.

== History ==
In 1977, after H.A. Rey’s death, Alan Shalleck approached Margret Rey, co-creator of Curious George, and proposed making a television series that was funded by Lafferty, Harwood, and Partners. When production for the series began in around 1979, Shalleck and Rey produced more than 100 five-minute episodes, as well as more than two dozen books. The shorts began airing on Nickelodeon in 1982, originally part of their preschool series Pinwheel, but also as a standalone program beginning in 1986. The Disney Channel purchased broadcast rights to Curious George in 1989 for their program Lunch Box, also airing the shorts as post-show interstitials until 1999. The shorts were also aired in New Zealand on TV One first as part of Chic Chat and later as a stand alone show.

In 1993, Rey successfully sued Lafferty, Harwood, and Partners for licensing VHS tapes to third-party companies without her permission.

== Episodes ==
Release dates of episodes are unknown, and the following list is ordered by writers.

Partial list of 1980s Curious George episodes
| Title | Writer(s) |
|---|---|
| "Curious George Goes to College" | Ken Sobol |
| "Curious George Wins a Contest" | Ken Sobol |
| "Curious George Goes Apple-Picking" | Ken Sobol |
| "Curious George Visits a Catsup Factory" | Ken Sobol |
| "Curious George Wins a Race" | Ken Sobol |
| "Curious George And the Maple Syrup" | Ken Sobol |
| "Curious George Goes to the Post Office" | Ken Sobol |
| "Curious George Visits the Old Town" | Ken Sobol |
| "Curious George Catches a Butterfly" | Ken Sobol |
| "Curious George Gets an X-Ray" | Ken Sobol |
| "Curious George Takes a Ferry" | Ken Sobol |
| "Curious George Goes to a Museum" | Ken Sobol |
| "Curious George Becomes a Salesman" | Ken Sobol |
| "Curious George Gets a Pizza" | Ken Sobol |
| "Curious George Delivers the Papers" | Ken Sobol |
| "Curious George At the Laundromat" | Ken Sobol |
| "Curious George Visits a Police Station" | Ken Sobol |
| "Curious George Goes to a Bowling Alley" | Ken Sobol |
| "Curious George Goes Skiing" | Ken Sobol |
| "Curious George Goes Fishing" | Ken Sobol |
| "Curious George Goes to a Restaurant" | Ken Sobol |
| "Curious George Goes to the Amusement Park" | Ken Sobol |
| "Curious George And the Runaway Elephant" | Ken Sobol |
| "Curious George Rings the Bell" | Ken Sobol |
| "Curious George Goes to a Ranch" | Ken Sobol |
| "Curious George Meets an Indian" | Ken Sobol |
| "Curious George Goes to the Aquarium" | Ken Sobol |
| "Curious George Goes Sledding" | Ken Sobol |
| "Curious George Goes to a Flower Show" | Ken Sobol |
| "Curious George Plays Bingo" | Ken Sobol |
| "Curious George And the Puppeteer" | Ken Sobol |
| "Curious George Goes to a Cook-Out" | Ken Sobol |
| "Curious George Ties a Knot" | Ken Sobol |
| "Curious George Goes to a TV Station" | Ken Sobol |
| "Curious George Drives a Steamshovel" | Ken Sobol |
| "Curious George Goes to an Air Show" | Ken Sobol & Alan J. Shalleck |
| "Curious George Gets a Star" | Tony Kahn |
| "Curious George At the Bakery" | Tony Kahn |
| "Curious George At the Ballet" | Tony Kahn |
| "Curious George On the Ice" | Tony Kahn & Harriet Reisen |
| "Curious George Goes to a Gas Station" | Tony Kahn & Harriet Reisen |
| "Curious George At the Bookstore" | Tony Kahn & Marjorie Prager |
| "Curious George At the Pet Shop" | Tony Kahn & Marjorie Prager |
| "Curious George Goes to a Costume Party" | Tony Kahn & Marjorie Prager |
| "Curious George Goes Camping" | Tony Kahn & Arnie Reisman |
| "Curious George Goes Hiking" | Tony Kahn & Arnie Reisman |
| "Curious George At the Fire Station" | Tony Kahn & Arnie Reisman |
| "Curious George Plays Baseball" | Tony Kahn & Arnie Reisman |
| "Curious George At the Country Store" | Tony Kahn & Arnie Reisman |
| "Curious George At the Photographer's Studio" | Tony Kahn & Arnie Reisman |
| "Curious George At the Parade" | Tony Kahn & Arnie Reisman |
| "Curious George At the Drive-In Movie" | Tony Kahn & Arnie Reisman |
| "Curious George At the Airport" | Tony Kahn & Arnie Reisman |
| "Curious George And the New Neighbors" | Tony Kahn & Arnie Reisman |
| "Curious George Goes Tomato Picking" | Frank Gehrecke |
| "Curious George At the Carnival" | Frank Gehrecke |
| "Curious George Goes to a Gym" | Frank Gehrecke |
| "Curious George And the Greenhouse" | Frank Gehrecke |
| "Curious George At the Beach" | Frank Gehrecke |
| "Curious George Goes to the Library" | Frank Gehrecke |
| "Curious George At the Farm" | Frank Gehrecke |
| "Curious George Goes to a Department Store" | Frank Gehrecke |
| "Curious George Goes to an Art Show" | Frank Gehrecke |
| "Curious George Unveils a Statue" | Frank Gehrecke |
| "Curious George And the Birdwatchers" | Frank Gehrecke |
| "Curious George And the Little Dog" | Frank Gehrecke, Clare Crowley & Alan J. Shalleck |
| "Curious George Bakes a Cake" | Linda Beech |
| "Curious George Visits the Railroad Station" | Linda Beech |
| "Curious George Visits the Dentist" | Linda Beech |
| "Curious George Goes to an Ice Cream Shop" | Linda Beech |
| "Curious George Visits a Hotel" | Linda Beech |
| "Curious George And the Dump Truck" | Linda Beech |
| "Curious George Visits a Barber" | Linda Beech |
| "Curious George Walks the Pets" | Linda Beech |
| "Curious George And the Dinosaur" | Alan J. Shalleck |
| "Curious George Learns to Write" | Alan J. Shalleck |
| "Curious George Washes the Little Blue Car" | Alan J. Shalleck |
| "Curious George Goes to a Block Party" | Daniel Rosen |
| "Curious George Goes to the Shoemaker" | Daniel Rosen |
| "Curious George And the Mini-Marathon" | Daniel Rosen |
| "Curious George Paints a Billboard" | Daniel Rosen |
| "Curious George Plays Basketball" | Daniel Rosen |
| "Curious George Catches a Foul Ball" | Daniel Rosen |
| "Curious George On Parade | Daniel Rosen |
| "Curious George And the Lost Letter" | Chris Atkinson & Wendy Williams |
| "Curious George Visits a Toy Store" | Clare A. Crowley |
| "Curious George And the Organ Grinder" | Clare A. Crowley |
| "Curious George Goes to a Surprise Party" | Claire A. Crowley |
| "Curious George Meets the Painter" | Wendy Williams |
| "Curious George Meets the Balloon Man" | Wendy Williams |
| "Curious George Goes to the Circus" | Wendy Williams |
| "Curious George And the Typewriter Case" | Wendy Williams |
| "Curious George Goes to the Tailor Shop" | Gloria Lesser-Rothstein |
| "Curious George Goes to a Wedding" | Katherine Randall |
| "Curious George Goes to the Zoo" | Bob Hertz |

== Crew ==
- H. A. Rey – co-creator of Curious George books
- Margret Rey – co-creator of Curious George books, consultant
- Alan Shalleck – producer, director, writer
- David J. Patterson – producer
- Jack Duffy – narrator
- Ken Sobol – writer
- Tony Kahn – writer
- Frank Gehrecke – writer
- Arnie Reisman – writer
- Linda Beech – writer
- Daniel Rosen – writer
- Clare A. Crowley – writer
- Chris Atkinson – writer
- Wendy Williams – writer
- Harriet Reisen – write
- Marjorie Prager – writer
- Gloria Lesser-Rothstein – writer
- Katherine Randall –writer
- Bob Hertz – writer
- Paul Baillargeon – music
- Dean Morgan – music
- Diann Ilnicki – editor
- Mik Casey (as Michael Casey) – art director
- Philippe Ralet – sound effect editor
- Lisa Atkinson – visual effects painter
