= Pretzel and the Puppies =

- Promotional poster
- Genre: Children's television Animation
- Based on: Pretzel and Pretzel and the Puppies by: Margret Rey; H.A. Rey
- Developed by: Steve Altiere; Kim Howitt
- Directed by: Andrew Woodhouse
- Voices of: Mark Duplass; Nasim Pedrad; Alex Jayne Go; Amari McCoy; Gracen Newton; Max Mitchell; Milo Stein
- Opening theme: "Paws Up!" performed by Myles Zuzzi
- Composers: Jake Monaco; Zachary Marsh
- Countries of origin: United States; Canada
- Original language: English
- No. of seasons: 2
- No. of episodes: 18

Production
- Executive producers: Caroline Fraser; Wes Lui; Ricardo Curtis; Steve Altiere
- Running time: 22 minutes
- Production companies: HarperCollins Productions; House of Cool; Saturday Animation Studio

Original release
- Network: Apple TV+
- Release: February 11, 2022 – February 24, 2023

Pretzel and the Puppies is a children's animated television series for Apple TV+. It is based on the books Pretzel and Pretzel and the Puppies by Margret Rey and H.A. Rey. The series was released on February 11, 2022. A holiday special was released on December 2, 2022. Season 2 was released on February 24, 2023.

== Plot ==
The show focuses on Pretzel, the world's longest dachshund, alongside his wife Greta and their pups Poppy, Pippa, Pedro, Puck and Paxton, as they solve problems in their town of Muttgomery and "Make their Mark".

== Cast ==
=== Main ===
- Mark Duplass as Pretzel
- Nasim Pedrad as Greta
- Alex Jayne Go as Poppy
- Amari McCoy as Pippa
- Gracen Newton as Pedro
- Max Mitchell as Puck
- Milo Stein as Paxton

=== Rucurring ===
- Remy Edgerly as Dill
- Juliet Donenfeld as Delilah
- Jeff Bennett as Mr. Bernard
- Elia Saldana as Ms. Clawtz
- Byron Marc Newsome as Mr. Shaggs
- Andrew Morgado as Mr. Kibble
- Lauri Fraser as Nana Doxie
- Fred Tatasciore as Gus Growler

== Episodes ==
=== Series overview ===
Season	Episodes	Originally released	
Season	Episodes	First released	Last released
1	9	February 11, 2022	December 2, 2022
2	9	February 23, 2023	

=== Season 1 (2022) ===
No. overall	No. in season	Title	Written by	Original release date
1	1	"Make Your Bark"	Steve Altiere	February 11, 2022
1	1	"Pup to the Races"	Peter Hunziker	February 11, 2022
2	2	"Treat Yourself"	Steve Altiere	February 11, 2022
2	2	"Pups on Parade"	Michael Rabb	February 11, 2022
3	3	"Do the Doxie"	Steve Altiere	February 11, 2022
3	3	"Hot Dog"	Sarah Katin and Nakia Trower Shuman	February 11, 2022
4	4	"Bowl Them Over"	Tone Thyne	February 11, 2022
4	4	"Cone-Do"	Peter Hunziker	February 11, 2022
5	5	"Welcome Waggin'"	Steve Altiere	February 11, 2022
5	5	"Groom Games"	Michael Rabb	February 11, 2022
6	6	"The Show Must Bark On"	Sarah Katin and Nakia Trower Shuman	February 11, 2022
6	6	"Dogs at Work"	Peter Hunziker	February 11, 2022
7	7	"Roller-Dogs"	Sarah Katin and Nakia Trower Shuman	February 11, 2022
7	7	"Sniff & Share"	Tone Thyne	February 11, 2022
8	8	"Firedogs to the Rescue!"	Steve Altiere	February 11, 2022
8	8	"Pups-Up Playground"	Sarah Katin and Nakia Trower Shuman	February 11, 2022
9	9	"Merry Muttgomery!"	Ron Burch and David Kidd	December 2, 2022

=== Season 2 (2023) ===
No. overall	No. in season	Title	Written by	Original release date
10	1	"Doggie Bags"	Jessica Welsh	February 23, 2023
10	1	"Fetch!"	Michael Rabb	February 23, 2023
11	2	"Bow Wow Bows"	Sarah Katin and Nakia Trower Shuman	February 23, 2023
11	2	"Snuggle Trouble"	Sarah Katin and Nakia Trower Shuman	February 23, 2023
12	3	"Ruff Truck"	Eva Konstantopoulos	February 23, 2023
12	3	"Flutter Pups"	Michael Rabb	February 23, 2023
13	4	"Pup Fiction"	Michael Rabb	February 23, 2023
13	4	"Night at the Pawspital"	Jessica Welsh	February 23, 2023
14	5	"New Tricks"	Ron Burch and David Kidd	February 23, 2023
14	5	"Outward Hound"	Tone Thyne	February 23, 2023
15	6	"Furry Finders"	Eva Konstantopoulos	February 23, 2023
15	6	"Howl Pals"	Michael Rabb	February 23, 2023
16	7	"Pup Tent"	Melinda LaRose	February 23, 2023
16	7	"Tree Bark"	Jessica Welsh	February 23, 2023
17	8	"Lunch Bunch"	Jessica Welsh	February 23, 2023
17	8	"Mama Time"	Ron Burch and David Kidd	February 23, 2023
18	9	"Pup Meet-Up"	Peter Hunziker	February 23, 2023
18	9	"Happy Bark-Day!"	Melinda LaRose	February 23, 2023

== Reception ==
The series received positive reviews from critics, who praised its creativity, colorful animation, and messages.

== Related media ==
In 2022, HarperCollins released a series of children's books as a tie-in to the series.
