= Curious George Gets a Medal =

1957 book by H. A. Rey

- First edition
- Author: H. A. Rey; Margret Rey
- Language: English
- Series: Curious George
- Genre: Children's literature
- Publisher: Houghton Mifflin
- Publication date: 1957
- Publication place: United States
- Media type: Print
- Preceded by: Curious George Rides a Bike
- Followed by: Curious George Flies a Kite

Curious George Gets a Medal is a George book written and illustrated by Margret Rey and H. A. Rey and published by Houghton Mifflin in 1957. It is the fourth book in the original Curious George series, and tells the story of George's flight into space. The story was published only weeks before the Soviets launched Sputnik II and Rey wanted to share his interests in space travel with children.

== Plot ==
George is reading a book (the picture shows that the book he reads is Curious George Takes a Job) when Mr. Miller, the mailman, brings a letter for George. George cannot read the letter, so he tries to write one of his own. He makes a mess with ink and a fountain pen and tries to wash it away with the garden hose, but the room floods and he rushes to a nearby farm to get a portable pump and get rid of the flood with it. But the pump is too heavy, so he tries to get it towed by a goat but is hurled away. He then tries to let one pig out of the pig pen but before he knows it all the pigs burst out of the pen. He manages to get the cow but is chased by the farmer. He eludes him by hiding in a shirt on a clothesline and then jumping into a pickup truck headed for a science museum.

At the museum, George accidentally destroys a model dinosaur display while trying to grab nuts off a model tree. The museum guards catch George and report the incident to the museum owner Professor Wiseman, who tells the guards to "lock the naughty monkey this instant and send him back to the zoo". The Man with the Yellow Hat stops the guards with the letter that Mr. Miller had brought. The letter says that Professor Wiseman wants him to go up in a space ship and then bail out. George agrees and is given a tiny space suit. At the critical moment, it is uncertain whether George will jump or not, but he does and the experiment is a success. George is carried to Earth by a parachute and is awarded a medal for him being the first space monkey.

== See also ==
- Ham, a chimpanzee who became the first great ape in space in a similar mission in January, 1961.
- Project Excelsior, an Air Force program where Captain Joseph Kittinger made record-setting parachute jumps from a stratospheric balloon gondola in 1959–1960.
- Project Manhigh, an Air Force program lifting human subjects into the stratosphere by balloon inside an enclosed gondola for aeromedical studies and first-person observations and photography of the edge of space, 1957–1958.
