= Curious George Goes to the Hospital =

1966 book by Margret and H. A. Rey

- First edition
- Author: H. A. Rey; Margret Rey
- Language: English
- Series: Curious George
- Genre: Children's literature
- Publisher: Houghton Mifflin
- Publication date: 1966
- Publication place: United States
- Media type: Print, Audiobook
- Preceded by: Curious George Learns the Alphabet

Curious George Goes to the Hospital is a children's picture book written and illustrated by Margret Rey and H. A. Rey and published by Houghton Mifflin in 1966. It is the seventh and final book in the original Curious George series, and tells the story of George's experiences in a hospital after swallowing a jigsaw puzzle piece.

The book was inspired by employees at the Boston Children's Hospital, who reached out to the Cambridge-based Reys to ask for help in getting children to prepare for going to the hospital.

== Plot ==
George wakes up to find a box labeled "surprise" on the desk; it contains a jigsaw puzzle. George opens the box, takes a puzzle piece out, and, thinking it is a piece of candy, he swallows it. The Man with the Yellow Hat comes home and tells George that the puzzle is a present for him. They both assemble the puzzle but notice that the last piece is missing. The man looks for the piece everywhere but cannot find it, and he thinks it's strange since it's a brand-new puzzle. Eventually, he gives up searching and he and George go to bed. In the morning, George has a stomachache and refuses to eat his breakfast. Worried, the Man calls Doctor Baker, who comes to the house but is unable to determine the problem so recommends that George should go to the hospital.

The Man reassures George on the way to the hospital, reminding him of being here before when he broke his leg and how kind the nurses were (referencing Curious George Takes a Job). George is given a barium drink from a nurse and then taken to the x-ray room. The x-ray reveals the puzzle piece lodged in George's stomach, and the Man with the Yellow Hat recognizes it right away. The doctor then tells George and the Man that a small operation is needed to remove the piece, and George would have to stay at the hospital for a few days. He said that a tube would be used to take the puzzle piece out of George's stomach.

Later, George is admitted to the waiting room where they see Betsy and her mother. Betsy is scared and worried because this is her first time in a hospital. George meets a nurse named Carol, who takes him to the children's ward, where he spends the night. In the morning, George's temperature and blood pressure are recorded, and he is given a pill and a shot to put him to sleep, then wheeled into the operating room. After surgery, George is groggy and does not want to read a new book the Man brings him, and Nurse Carol tells the Man to let him sleep.

When George wakes up the next day, George feels better and has a dish of ice cream before Carol takes George to the playroom. In the playroom, George puts on a puppet show. Back in the children's ward, he sees that Steve, a boy with a cast on his leg, trying to walk. With no one looking, George hops into Steve's wheelchair and races down the corridors. By the time the nurse notices, George is heading down a steep ramp toward the hospital cafeteria. Meanwhile, some attendants are pushing food carts past the ramp and the mayor is touring the hospital. George tries to stop the wheelchair but crashes into the food carts and lands in the mayor's arms while spilling food and breaking the wheelchair and the dishes. The children see the accident and the first to laugh is Betsy. This gets everyone laughing except George who cries, thinking he might be punished. Betsy consoles George telling him that he has cheered her up. The adults agree George is not in trouble because he made Betsy no longer feel afraid. Soon the Man with the Yellow Hat arrives to take George home.

As they leave, Nurse Carol gives George a package to take home. At home George finds it to be the puzzle piece he swallowed, he is happy that the doctor and nurse had saved it for them. Now able to finish the puzzle, he and the Man place the last missing piece in the center of it. The now-completed puzzle is the picture of George on the grass of the jungle with the Man's yellow hat in front of him, which was taken near the end of Curious George Takes A Job.

== Adaptation ==
Churchill Films adapted the book into a short film in 1983. Curious George Goes to the Hospital was named to the ALA Notable Children's Videos list in 1983.
