= Curious George Rides a Bike =

Book by H. A. Rey

- First edition
- Author: H. A. Rey; Margret Rey
- Language: English
- Series: Curious George
- Genre: Children's literature
- Publisher: Houghton Mifflin
- Publication date: 1952
- Publication place: United States
- Media type: Print
- Preceded by: Curious George Takes a Job
- Followed by: Curious George Gets a Medal

Curious George Rides a Bike is a children's book written and illustrated by Margret Rey and H. A. Rey and published by Houghton Mifflin in 1952. It is the third book of the original Curious George series and tells the story of George's new bicycle and his experiences performing with an animal show.

The book was later adapted into an animated short film from Weston Woods Studios in 1958 and an episode of a PBS Kids TV show of the same name in 2007, but with a few differences, such as George getting his bike repaired by the Renkins.

== Plot ==
To celebrate the three years since he brought George home from the jungle, The Man With The Yellow Hat plans to take George to the animal show, and he has also bought George a blue bicycle. The man leaves for an errand and tells George to stay close to the house. George is shown doing many tricks with it, including riding backwards, and riding on the back wheel. As he is riding, he meets the local paperboy, whom he helps deliver his papers. After tossing the papers to one side of the street, he sees the road continue off somewhere he is curious about, so he rides on and does not deliver to the other side. He rides past a stream and sees two boys playing with boats, and decides he wants to play with boats as well, so he gets off the bike and starts folding all the newspapers into boats (with helpful diagrams to help the reader do the same) and set them off in the water to watch them float around. As he watches his boats float down the stream, he is still riding the bike, but forgetting to watch where he was going, he crashes into a rock, emerging unhurt but severely damaging his front wheel. Not knowing what to do now (after trying to ride normally, and trying to carry the bike) he breaks down into tears, but then brightens up when he realized he can still ride the bike on the back wheel.

As he is doing this, he comes across trucks (which resemble airport towing tractors) pulling trailers carrying the animals for the animal show. In one of the trucks is the show's director, along with Bob, his mechanic, who fixes George's damaged wheel on the bike. The director decides to put George in the show as a bugle player and gives him a green coat and cap similar to Bob's. As they set up, he warns George not to feed the animals, especially the ostrich, due to his propensity to eat anything that is held near him. The show also features an elephant, a rhino, a hippo, a giraffe, a camel, a kangaroo and her joey, a leopard, a sea lion, and a bear cub. When George gets too curious about that, he walks with his bugle in front the ostrich, unaware that it might swallow the bugle, the ostrich snatches it and gets it lodged in his throat. The workers hear the noise, and after a struggle to get the bugle out of the ostrich, the director, angry, then scolds George for his actions, and he was initially removed from the show and forced to sit on a bench until the director brought him back to The Man With The Yellow Hat. As George thinks about his mistake, he notices the ostrich pulling a string that allows a cage door to open and the bear cub to escape. Seeing this, he grabs the bugle, blows a warning, then hops on his bike and takes off after the bear. At first the workers and the director think he was misbehaving again, until they see the empty bear cage.

By the time he catches up to the bear cub, it had climbed a tree, but was now hanging precariously on a branch (which explains that bear cubs can climb up a tree easily, but getting down is much harder) scared while other workers (who chased the bear behind George) were standing there hoping to catch it. George gets to the tree, climbs up it, puts the bear in the empty newspaper sack he still had, and lowers him safely into the workers' arms. When he gets back down from the tree, the director then decides that because George was brave for saving the bear, George is forgiven and regains his spot in the show.

The whole city comes to see the show, including the paperboy, the Man, and even all the residents who never got their newspapers that day due to George. Afterwards, he is praised for his act, and got to keep the coat, cap, and the bugle. The Man then takes him home to bed.

== Reviews ==
Curious George Rides a Bike was reviewed by Kirkus Reviews.
