= Curious George Learns the Alphabet =

1963 children's book by Margret & H. A. Rey

Curious George Learns The Alphabet
- First edition
- Author: H. A. Rey; Margret Rey
- Language: English
- Series: Curious George
- Genre: Children's literature
- Publisher: Houghton Mifflin
- Publication date: 1963
- Publication place: United States
- Media type: Print
- Preceded by: Curious George Flies a Kite
- Followed by: Curious George Goes to the Hospital

Curious George Learns the Alphabet is a children's book written and illustrated by Margret Rey and H. A. Rey and published by Houghton Mifflin in 1963. It is the sixth book in the original Curious George series.

== Plot ==
George looks at the little black marks, dots, and lines in the Man with the Yellow Hat's books, and starts tearing some pages. When the Man returns, he admonishes George. If George wants to read a story, he first has to know the letters of the alphabet. The man then sets up a pad and begins to write each of the letters from the alphabet as well as drawing a picture for each letter (capital and lowercase letter) of the alphabet, correlating to the letter each individual picture starts with.

- An Alligator is in the form of a big A, and a piece of an apple is in the form of a small a.
- A blue Bird with feet on it, a tail, and a Bill is in the form of a big B, and a bee is in the form of a small b buzzing around a blossom.
- A big Crab is in the form of a big C with a shell, feet, and two Claws. A small crab is in the form of a small c, which looks like the big C, but smaller.

The man tells George he now has three letters: A, B, and C. With three letters, George can make a word, the first word he can read himself: cab (another word for a taxi). George knows what a cab is since the man once took him for a ride in a cab. They then draw the next few letters.

- A Dinosaur is in the form of a big D. A dromedary, which is a camel with one hump, is in the form of a small d.
- An Elephant is in the form of a big E eating his evening meal: Eggplants. The ear of a man, or the ear of a monkey is in the form of a small e.
- A Fireman Fighting a Fire is in the form a big F and a flower is in the form of a small f. George's friend was fond of flowers, even though George preferred food.
- A Goose is in the form of a big G, and a goldfish is in the form of a small g. The name George also starts with the letter G.

After learning seven letters, The Man writes words that can be made with these letters down: Dad, Ed, bad, bed, bag, cage, and feed. The Man then tells George to read them while he gets him his lunch. However, when The Man comes back with George's lunch, he catches George wearing the alphabet chart around his neck. When he sees George's mischief, the Man is disappointed and reprimands George, saying that the only one of the words that George can read appears to be "bad." The Man then decides they had enough for the morning. He feeds George and lets him take a nap, before they go on with the letters.

- A House is in the form of a big H and a horse eating heaps of hay is in the form of a small h.
- An Icicle is in the form of a big I, and an iguana is in the form of a small i.
- A Jaguar is in the form of a big J living in the Jungle, where George formerly lived. A jack-in-the-box is in the form of a small j in which George used to make it jump.
- A big Kangaroo named Katy is in the form of a big K and a small kangaroo, who is Katy's kid, is in the form of a small k.
- A Lion is in the form of a big L (with a Leg of Lamb for Lunch) and a lean lady is in the form of a small l strolling along a lake licking a lollipop.
- A Mailman named Mr. Miller bringing a letter is in the form of a big M, and a mouse munching mints is in the form of a small m.

The Man tells George that M is the 13th letter of the alphabet, and since the whole alphabet has 26 letters, this means that they are halfway through. The Man gives George a pad of paper and a pencil to list some words that use the first 13 letters.

George started to think of words, and then he wrote them down and shows them to The Man. He is quite impressed with the real words (ball, milk, cake, ham, jam, egg, lime, feed, and kid), but gets confused at the gibberish words (dalg, glidj, and blimlimlim). He reminds George that random arrangements of letters do not form words. George and The Man then begin to look at the other half of the alphabet.

- A Napkin is in the form of a big N standing on a dinner plate that looks Neat, a nose is in the form of a small n in the face of a man who wears a new blue necktie and nibbles noodles.
- A big Ostrich is in the form of a big O, and a small ostrich is in the form of a small o. Ostriches eat odd objects, especially a bugle that belonged to George.
- A big Penguin is in the form of a big P, and a small penguin is in the form of a small p.
- A Quail is in the form of a small Q. A quarterback is in the form of a small q. A quarterback is supposed to be quick, and so is George.

The Man tells George to get his football. He then says that it will do George good to play as quarterback for a while before they go on with the letters.

- A Rabbit is in the form of a big R with a radish, and a rooster is in the form of a small r.
- A big Snail is in the form of a big S, and a small snail is in the form of a small s.
- A Table is in the form of a big T set for a Tea for Two (George did not care for Tea, but he liked Toast), and a tomahawk is in the form of a small t.

The Man tells George that it is snack time. He gives George a note to run over to the baker and hand him the note and to come right back with one dozen doughnuts without any tricks. George curiously looks at the note the man had written and outsmarts his plan by changing the word "one" to "ten." Then, he goes over to the bakery to request ten dozen doughnuts to the baker. The baker, unaware that the note originally and specifically said "one dozen," says that an extra-large bag is needed for ten dozen doughnuts. George brings the bag of ten dozen doughnuts home, opens the bag and dumps them out onto the floor.

When the Man catches George dumping all the doughnuts down to the floor and sees that the note has been changed, he is horrified and then speaks severely to him, saying that it must be what he (the Man) gets for teaching the alphabet to a little monkey. The Man then tells George he cannot eat any doughnuts right now and to put them all back in the bag, until they finish the alphabet.

- A big Umbrella standing Upright is in the form of a big U and a small umbrella is in the form of a small u. The umbrella handle also looks like the letter U.
- A big Valentine is in the form of a big V, and a small valentine is in the form of a small v. George loved valentines. He got several valentine cards every year, especially from Nevada.
- Whiskers, big ones and small ones, are in the form of a big W and small w, found on walruses, cats, and some men. George does not have whiskers but he was curious how would look if he did.
- The big X and the small x look alike, only one is big and the other is small, just the same as some of the other letters (such as W, V, U, S, etc.). Since there are only a few words that start with the letter X, neither of them look like the letter X, except for Xmas. Santa stands for Xmas. Since there is only one Santa, George and the man need only one picture. As a result, the big X and the small x are both for Xmas.
- A big Yak is in the form of a big Y, a small, young yak is in the form of a small y in Tibet.
- A big Zebra is in the form of a big Z, and a small zebra is in the form of a small z. The zebras are zipping along with zest.

Since Z is the last letter of the alphabet, the Man tells George that he now knows all 26 letters of the alphabet, and now he may have the doughnuts. At the last page, the story ends when George spells out "THE END" with some of the doughnuts.
