= Curious George (film) =

2006 animated film directed by Matthew O'Callaghan

- Theatrical release poster
- Directed by: Matthew O'Callaghan
- Screenplay by: Ken Kaufman
- Story by: Ken Kaufman; Mike Werb
- Based on: Curious George by H. A. Rey; Margret Rey; Alan J. Shalleck
- Produced by: Ron Howard; David Kirschner; Jon Shapiro
- Starring: Will Ferrell; Drew Barrymore; David Cross; Eugene Levy; Joan Plowright; Dick Van Dyke
- Edited by: Julie Rogers
- Music by: Heitor Pereira
- Production companies: Universal Animation Studios; Imagine Entertainment; David Kirschner Productions
- Distributed by: Universal Pictures (United States and Canada); United International Pictures (International)
- Release dates: January 28, 2006 (ArcLight Hollywood); February 10, 2006 (United States)
- Running time: 87 minutes
- Country: United States
- Language: English
- Budget: $50 million
- Box office: $71.1 million

Curious George is a 2006 American animated adventure comedy film directed by Matthew O'Callaghan and written by Ken Kaufman, based on the book series by H. A. Rey and Margret Rey. The film is an origin story of how the Man with the Yellow Hat met George while trying to save the Bloomsberry museum from closing. The voice cast includes Will Ferrell, Drew Barrymore, David Cross, Eugene Levy, Joan Plowright, and Dick Van Dyke.

From 1990, the film languished in development hell at Imagine Entertainment, and several directors were suggested until O'Callaghan was hired in August 2004. The film contains a unique blend of traditionally animated characters and computer-animated environments. The score was composed by Heitor Pereira and it features several original songs by musician Jack Johnson.

Curious George premiered at the ArcLight Hollywood on January 28, 2006, and was theatrically released in the United States on February 10, by Universal Pictures, to generally positive reviews from critics. The film was a commercial disappointment, grossing $71 million against its $50 million budget, but was then followed by five direct-to-video sequels and a television series.

== Plot ==
Ted Shackleford is a tour guide at the Bloomsberry Museum, where he gives weekly presentations to schoolteacher Maggie Dunlop and her students. Ted's boss, Mr. Bloomsberry, informs him that the museum will have to close due to dwindling funds. Bloomsberry's son, Junior, intends to have the museum demolished and replaced with a multi-level parking lot. Ted impulsively volunteers to find the Lost Shrine of Zagawa, a forty-foot tall statue that could attract new visitors. Jealous of Mr. Bloomsberry's constant praise of Ted, Junior sabotages the expedition by burning half of the map. Ted is outfitted with a bright yellow suit and hat from a clothing store before departing on a cargo ship, the H. A. Rey.

Once in the African jungle, Ted follows the sabotaged map to the shrine. However, he finds that the statue is only three inches tall. He sends a photograph of it to the museum, but the picture's angle leads Mr. Bloomsberry to believe that the idol is even larger than expected. Before departing, Ted befriends a curious monkey who stows away on the ship and follows him back to his apartment building. The monkey vandalizes the penthouse apartment of opera singer Miss Plushbottom's with paint and Ted is evicted per the building's strict no-pet policy by the doorman, Ivan.

Back at the museum, Ted reveals the idol's actual size to Mr. Bloomsberry and is kicked out by Junior when the monkey accidentally destroys an Apatosaurus skeleton. After a failed call to animal control, Ted and the monkey are forced to sleep outside in a park, where they start to bond. The next morning, Ted follows the monkey to a nearby zoo where they encounter Maggie and her students. Ted names the monkey George after a nearby statue of George Washington and saves him after he floats away due to holding too many balloons.

At the home of Clovis, an inventor, George discovers that an overhead projector can make objects appear huge and Ted realizes they can use it on the small idol he found to save the exhibit. Ted and George show the projector to Mr. Bloomsberry, but Junior sabotages the plan with his latte, destroying the projector while framing George. Defeated, Ted informs the public outside the museum that it is going to close. He then allows animal control to capture George, who place him on the H. A. Rey in order to return him to Africa.

A remorseful Ted speaks with Maggie who encourages him to rescue George. Later that night, Ted sneaks onto the ship and reunites with George in the cargo hold. George notices that the idol reveals a pictogram when light shines through it and Ted realizes that it is a map leading to the real idol. When they arrive in Africa, they find the true 40-foot-tall idol.

The idol is displayed in the museum along with new interactive exhibits, which generate enough public interest to save the museum. Junior begins working as a valet for museum guests and is happy when he finally receives praise from his father. Ted is invited to move back in to his apartment by Ivan when the latter is visiting the museum. Ted and Maggie share a romantic moment that is interrupted when George accidentally activates a rocket, resulting in Ted and George launching into space.

== Voice cast ==
- Will Ferrell as Ted Shackleford/The Man with the Yellow Hat, a tour guide at the Bloomsberry Museum. In a deleted scene, his last name was revealed to be Shackleford.
- Dick Van Dyke as Mr. Bloomsberry, the director and owner of the Bloomsberry Museum
- David Cross as Junior, the son of the museum's owner who feels neglected by his father
- Frank Welker as George, a curious tailless monkey and Ted's comic relief sidekick. The film's press notes mentioned that while George would be more accurately described as a chimpanzee, he was referred to as a monkey for tradition and consistency with the book series.
- Drew Barrymore as Maggie Dunlop, an elementary school teacher and Ted's love interest
- Eugene Levy as Clovis, an inventor who builds robotic animals
- Joan Plowright as Ms. Plushbottom, Ted's wealthy neighbor and opera singer, whose apartment gets vandalized by George
- Ed O'Ross as Ivan, the doorman of Ted's apartment

== Production ==
=== Development ===
In 1990, Imagine Entertainment co-chairman Brian Grazer and producer David Kirschner had a discussion after lunch at Kirschner's home. Discussing about Curious George, Grazer thought it was a "great idea" for a film distributed by Imagine. The same year, producer Jon Shapiro contacted Margret Rey about the possibility of producing a film based on the book. Shapiro recalled that he promised her to make the best version of Curious George as possible. On June 10, 1990, it was announced that Imagine secured the film rights for Curious George, with plans to produce a live action film jointly with Hanna-Barbera Productions. As of 1997, Alan J. Shalleck was directing, producing, and writing the film.

Universal Pictures acquired the merchandising rights to Curious George from publisher Houghton Mifflin in September 1997, after Margret Rey's death the previous year. In March 1998, Larry Guterman signed on to direct and worked closely with Imagine Entertainment co-chairman Ron Howard to develop the film. However, Guterman left the project reportedly after budget concerns about the film's special effects. By December 1998, Howard became the director of the film; it was scheduled to be released in 1999.

In October 1999, Universal and Imagine were finalizing a deal with Brad Bird to write and direct a Curious George film that combined live action and computer-generated imagery (CGI). In July 2001, the newly merged Vivendi Universal acquired Houghton Mifflin, with plans to position Curious George as the company's new mascot, coincident with the film's development and release. In December, Universal was in negotiations with David Silverman to direct the film. In September 2003, Jun Falkenstein was signed on to direct the film. In August 2004, Falkenstein was fired by the studio after working for more than a year. Falkenstein was replaced by Matthew O'Callaghan. In late 2003, David Brewster joined the production as an animator supervisor.

=== Writing ===
According to Stacey Snider, then-chairman of Universal Pictures, it was challenging to turn the relatively simple Curious George books into a full-length film with substantial character development. Shapiro also stated that it was painful to find the right tone for the film. During the film's production, many screenwriters wrote potential scripts for the project. In June 2002, Michael McCullers was signed on to write the screenplay of the film, but left the project by March 2004. Pat Proft wrote a live action comedy draft of the film that focused on the relationship between The Man with the Yellow Hat and George. Brad Bird wrote the script for the film before he was called by Pixar to direct The Incredibles. William Goldman's script was darker in tone and targeted towards adults. Others include Rob Baird and Dan Gerson, Steve Bencich and Ron J. Friedman, Lowell Ganz and Babaloo Mandel, Brian Levant, Shallack, Joe Stillman, Audrey Wells, and Mike Werb.

When O'Callaghan signed on to direct, Howard brought him into a meeting with Ken Kaufman. After acknowledging issues with the previous scripts, Howard and Kaufman rewrote the story in a conference room for two weeks, taking some elements from the existing story, created new characters and the story of the film, and simplified the story elements. They expanded the role of The Man in the Yellow Hat, making the script more like a buddy film rather than a film that focuses primarily on George. The final script contained scenes inspired by well-known parts of the books.

=== Casting ===
In September 2003, Will Ferrell signed on to provide the voice of the Man in the Yellow Hat. In March 2005, Variety confirmed that the voice cast included Drew Barrymore, David Cross, Dick Van Dyke, Eugene Levy, Joan Plowright, and Ed O'Ross.

=== Animation ===
Before its full transition to animation, Grazer tried different genres for the film, including live action and live action animation, as well as digital effects, but he was worried that it would look "old-fashioned". In 1999, Bird was planning to direct the film as a combination of live action and CG. In July 2001, Grazer announced that it would shift the film towards all-CG due to the success of Shrek. Grazer further explained that the transition was done to become easier for George to be conveyed in CGI animation. Eventually, a final decision was made to use traditional animation for the film to recreate the look and feel of the Curious George books, lowering the costs of the animation. Following a strict production schedule, the film was animated in eight studios located in the United States, Canada, France, Taiwan, and South Korea.

=== Soundtrack and music ===
Jack Johnson was hired to write and perform the songs in the film. Growing up liking Curious George, Johnson wrote thirteen songs for the soundtrack of the film Sing-A-Longs and Lullabies for the Film Curious George; nine of the songs were featured in the film. Johnson worked closely with the animation team and created songs by writing lyrics and making rough versions of each song in response to black-and-white sketches of a scene. After the editors changed the amount of frames to synchronize the beats of each song, Johnson added other instruments, including strings. As George never speaks, Johnson wrote the songs and used his voice as a narrative of George, carefully writing lyrics that appeal to children that is not dumb or "too childlike" for adults. A cavaquinho was played to represent George, and a piano set the tone for the Man in the Yellow Hat. Matt Costa, Ben Harper, and G. Love were also featured in three songs.

== Release ==
In September 2003, Universal announced that Curious George was scheduled to be released on October 7, 2005. After DreamWorks Pictures scheduled Wallace & Gromit: The Curse of the Were-Rabbit to be released a week early, it was shifted to November 4. In August 2004, the release date was moved to February 2006. The world premiere of Curious George took place on January 28, 2006 at the ArcLight Hollywood in Los Angeles.

=== Home media ===
The film was released on DVD on September 26, 2006 by Universal Studios Home Entertainment in separate widescreen and full-screen versions. It was released on Blu-ray on March 3, 2015. Curious George grossed a total of $48.3 million in DVD and Blu-ray sales.

=== Video game ===
A tie-in video game was released on February 1, 2006 in the United States. It was published by Namco Hometek and released for the GameCube, PlayStation 2, Xbox, Game Boy Advance, and Microsoft Windows. The game was developed by Monkey Bar Games for the console and PC editions and Torus Games for the GBA edition.

== Reception ==
=== Box office ===
The film was released on February 10, 2006, alongside The Pink Panther and Final Destination 3. It opened with $3.8 million on its first day, with an average gross of $1,465 per theater, and made $14.7 million in its first weekend, averaging $5,730 per theater, ranking third behind Final Destination 3.

The film's box office run ended on April 30, 2006. It made $58.6 million in the United States and Canada, and $12.4 million in other territories, for a worldwide total of $71.1 million, against a budget of $50 million.

=== Critical response ===
On the review aggregator website Rotten Tomatoes, 70% of 106 critics' reviews are positive, with an average rating of 6.10/10. The website's consensus reads: "Curious George is a bright, sweet, faithful adaptation of the beloved children's books." Metacritic, which uses a weighted average, assigned the film a score of 62 out of 100, based on 28 critics, indicating "generally favorable" reviews. Audiences polled by CinemaScore during opening weekend gave the film an average grade of "A−" on an A+ to F scale. Reviews frequently praised the film's light-hearted tone and its traditional animation style, though some criticized the plot and modern references.

In The New York Times, Dana Stevens called the film "an unexpected delight", praising its "top-drawer voice talent" and "old-fashioned two-dimensional animation that echoes the simple colors and shapes of the books". The Austin Chronicle's Marrit Ingman wrote positively of the film's "sweet, simple message" that "children see the world differently and have much to teach the people who love them". Christy Lemire of the Associated Press praised George's character design, writing that "with his big eyes and bright smile and perpetually sunny disposition, he's pretty much impossible to resist". Roger Ebert gave the film three out of four stars, noting that it remained "faithful to the spirit and innocence of the books" and writing that the visual style was "uncluttered, charming, and not so realistic that it undermines the fantasies on the screen". Ebert wrote that while he did not particularly enjoy the film himself, he nevertheless gave the film a "thumbs up" on his Ebert & Roeper show because he felt that it would be enjoyable for young children.

Richard Roeper, Ebert's co-host, criticized the film for similar reasons and said that he could not "tell people my age, or someone twenty-five [years old], that they should spend nine or ten bucks to see this movie". Brian Lowry of Variety felt that the plot was too simplistic, writing that the film consisted primarily of "various chases through the city" and was "rudimentary on every level". On the other hand, Michael Phillips of the Chicago Tribune wrote that the film was "overplotted and misfocused" and that "the script's jokes are tougher to find than the shrine", though he praised the film for staying "relatively faithful to the style of the original and delightful H. A. Rey illustrations". Jan Stuart of Newsday criticized the modern references in the film, including cell phones and lattes, writing that they resulted in "modernization traps that the makers of the very respectable Winnie the Pooh films managed to avoid". Owen Gleiberman of Entertainment Weekly also negatively noted the anachronisms in the film, such as the use of caller ID.

=== Accolades ===
The song "Upside Down" by Jack Johnson received a Satellite Award nomination for Best Original Song.

== Franchise ==
=== Television series ===
The PBS Kids animated television series, also called Curious George, was developed concurrent to the feature film. It also stars Frank Welker reprising his voice role of Curious George and with William H. Macy (later Rino Romano) narrating.

=== Sequels ===
A sequel, Curious George 2: Follow That Monkey!, was released on March 2, 2010. The plot of the sequel centers around George becoming friends with a young elephant named Kayla. George tries to help Kayla travel across the country to be reunited with her family. A second sequel, Curious George 3: Back to the Jungle was released on June 23, 2015. A third sequel, Curious George: Royal Monkey, serving as the fourth film of the series, which is flash-animated instead of traditionally animated was released on DVD on September 10, 2019. A fourth sequel titled Curious George: Go West, Go Wild premiered on September 8, 2020 on Peacock, and was also released on DVD and digital on December 15. A fifth sequel, Curious George: Cape Ahoy, serving as the sixth and final film of the series, was released on Peacock on September 30, 2021. With the exceptions of Frank Welker and Ed O'Ross, none of the voice cast from the original film returned for the sequels.

=== Live-action film ===
In July 2010, shortly after the release of their first film, Despicable Me, Illumination Entertainment was reportedly developing an animated film based on the book. In August 2016, Andrew Adamson was in negotiations to direct, write, and produce a live-action adaptation of Curious George for Universal Pictures, along with Ron Howard, Brian Grazer, David Kirschner, Jon Shapiro, and Erica Huggins serving as executive producers for it. By March 2020, Jim Taylor was brought to re-write the film.

== See also ==
- List of fictional primates in animation
