= McCain Library and Archives =

Chief reserve library for The University of Southern Mississippi, United States

Coordinates: 31°19′35″N 89°20′3″W

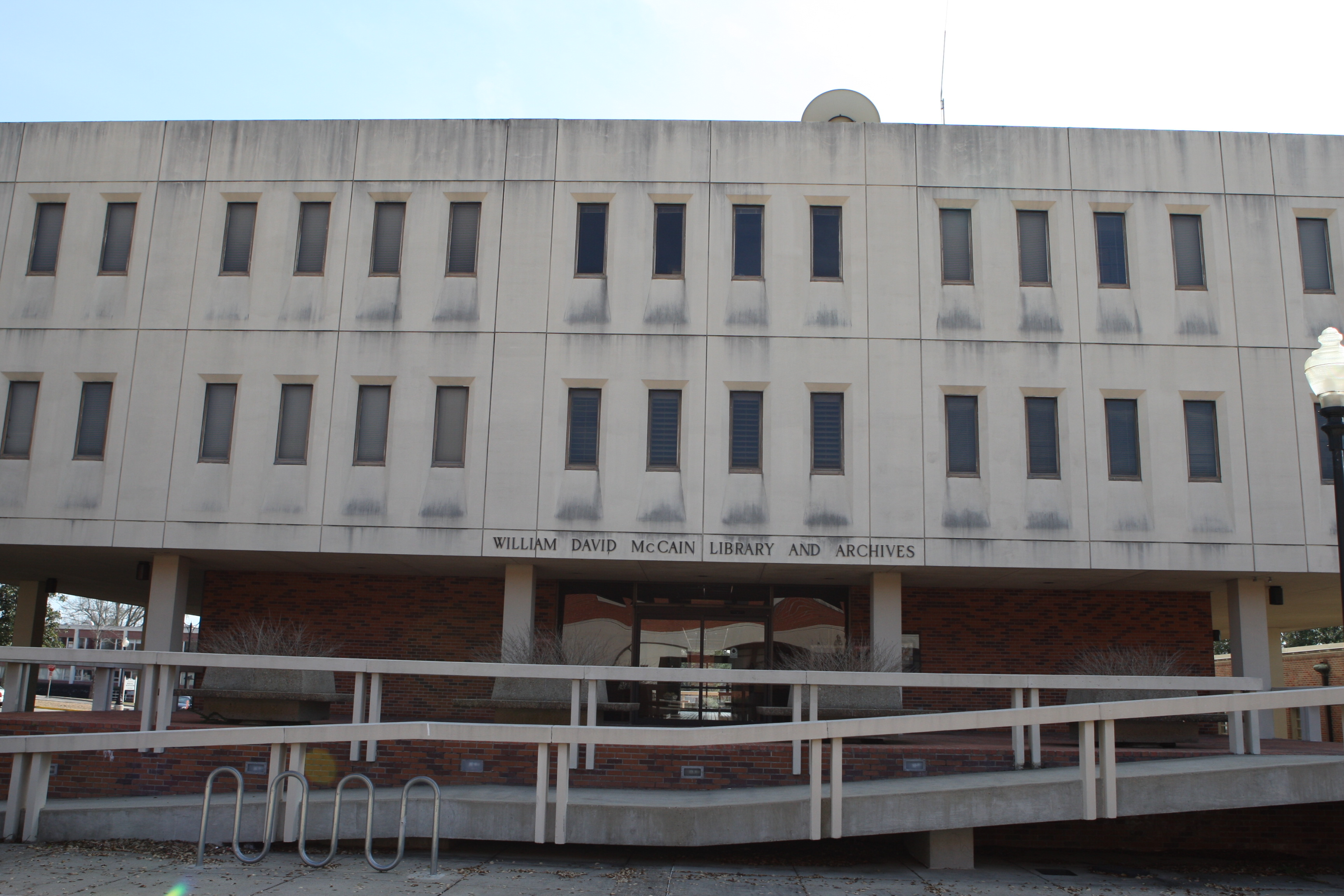
- Interactive map of the McCain Library and Archives area

General information
- Location: Hattiesburg, Mississippi, United States
- Owner: University of Southern Mississippi

The McCain Library and Archives is the chief reserve library for The University of Southern Mississippi. It houses the items in Southern Mississippi's possession that are not available for checkout. Besides being the archives, the building also houses the office of the President Emeritus, and the universities audio visual department. The Archives also house the de Grummond Children's Literature Collection, one of the largest collections of children's literature in the world.

== De Grummond Children's Literature Collection ==
The de Grummond Children's Literature Collection is part of the McCain Library and Archives on the Hattiesburg campus of The University of Southern Mississippi. It is one of North America's leading research centers in the field of children's literature. The focus is on American and British children's literature, historical as well as contemporary.

The collection is named for Dr. Lena Y. de Grummond, who founded it in 1966. She was a professor in the field of library science (specializing in children's literature) at The University of Southern Mississippi in Hattiesburg, Mississippi, who assembled materials sent by contributors from around the world. More than 1200 artists, illustrators, and collectors have generously donated published books and original materials.

Dr. De Grummond contacted the Reys in 1966 about the university's new children's literature collection. H.A. and Margret made a donation of a pair of sketches at the time. In 1996, after Margret's death, it was revealed in her will that the entire literary estate of the Reys was to be donated to the de Grummond Children's Literature Collection at The University of Southern Mississippi.

One major acquisition was papers of Ezra Jack Keats, 165 boxes processed in 1998, the only Keats archive. It includes artwork, dummies, manuscripts, typescripts and proofs for 37 books written or illustrated by Keats; personal, professional and fan correspondence; photographs and childhood memorabilia.

== Curious George collection ==
The McCain building is home to the world's largest collection of Curious George writings and artifacts. Many of the original artworks for Curious George are housed in the McCain Library and Archives. The author of Curious George even created a special drawing as a gift to the university upon giving their collection to the university that depicts George carrying all of his books, while walking past an old time sign that directs to Hattiesburg. A copy of this drawing can be viewed in the Curious George section of Barnes and Noble in the Thad Cochran Center.
