= Pretzel (picture book) =

Book by Margret Rey

- Author: Margret Rey
- Illustrator: H.A. Rey
- Language: English
- Genre: Children's story
- Publisher: Harper & Brothers
- Publication date: 1944
- Publication place: United States
- Media type: Print (hardcover)
- ISBN: 978-0-395-83737-5
- OCLC: 438436384
- Dewey Decimal: [E] 20
- LC Class: PZ7.R3302 Pr 1997

Pretzel is a children's picture book written in 1944 by Margret Rey, illustrated by H.A. Rey and first published by Harper & Brothers.

The story was republished in 1997 by Houghton Mifflin.

== Synopsis ==
The story begins with the line, "One morning in May, five little dachshunds were born". Among the five puppies is a male dachshund dubbed Pretzel. Though unremarkable at first and virtually indistinguishable from the rest of the litter, Pretzel soon grows to be extraordinarily long, much longer than his brothers and sisters. He becomes the longest dachshund in the world, earning a blue ribbon at a dog show. Pretzel is so long that he can twist his body into the shape of his namesake.

His length draws attention and praise from humans and dogs alike, save for one female dachshund named Greta. Pretzel is smitten by Greta, who lives across the street and who is unimpressed by Pretzel's length; claiming she "doesn't like long dogs". Despite Pretzel's efforts to woo her with gifts, she continues to snub his affections.

While watching Greta from afar, Pretzel sees Greta accidentally fall into a dry water well. The well is too deep for Greta to escape on her own, but shallow enough that Pretzel can hook onto the rim of the well with his hindquarters, lower his body into the well and extract her with his teeth via the scruff of her neck. It is after her rescue that Greta returns Pretzel's affections, agrees to marry him despite his length and the story ends with the same line and much the same illustration which opened the story, except the "five little dachshunds" in this case belong to Pretzel and Greta.

== TV series ==
A 3D-animated television series based on the book Pretzel and the Puppies premiered on Apple TV+ on February 11, 2022 with Mark Duplass voicing the title role. A holiday special was released on December 2 the same year. Season 2 was released on February 24, 2023.
