= List of fictional primates in animation =

This is a list of fictional primates in animation, and is a subsidiary to the list of fictional primates. Non-tailed primates such as chimpanzees, gorillas and orangutans are included in the apes section. Tailed primates such as monkeys, baboons, aye-ayes and marmosets are included in the Monkeys section. This list does not include humans, prehistoric human species, or humanoids.

== Apes ==
Ape	Species	Origin	Notes
Bingo	Gorilla	The Banana Splits	
Bobo	Chimpanzee	Kim Possible	The mascot of Camp Wannaweep, a camp that Ron Stoppable attended in his youth.
Bobo Haha	Chimpanzee	Generator Rex	A purple chimpanzee who gained sapience and the ability to speak after becoming an E.V.O. He is Rex Salazar's sidekick and best friend.
Booby	Chimpanzee	Perman	
Charles Simian	Chimpanzee	Captain Simian and the Space Monkeys	
Captain Gutt	Gigantopithecus	Ice Age: Continental Drift	A pirate and master of the seas. He got his name from his fingernails, which he uses to gut his victims.
Chim-Chim	Chimpanzee	Speed Racer	Pet of Speed's younger brother, Spritle
Dalilah	Gorilla	Kingdom Force	A female gorilla. She is one of six main leading characters and the team's only female member.
Gorilla	Gorilla	Cromartie High School	Considered smarter than most of the main characters. He is also an extremely talented sushi chef.
Gori-san	Mountain gorilla	Jungle King Tar-chan	He is very gentle and kind, and like Etekichi is smarter than an ordinary gorilla, but unlike Etekichi he cannot talk.
Gorilla	Gorilla	Battle Spirits: Saikyou Ginga Ultimate Zero	
Gorilla Goalie	Gorilla	Bedknobs and Broomsticks	A gorilla is seen during the soccer match, where he is one of its two goalies, the other being an elephant.
Gorilla Megalo	Gorilla	Kore wa Zombie desu ka? Of the Dead	
Gorzan	Gorilla	Legends of Chima	The prince of the Gorilla tribe.
Grape Ape	Gorilla	The Great Grape Ape Show	A 40-foot-tall purple gorilla with the mind of a child.
Gumbo	Chimpanzee	Foster's Home for Imaginary Friends	
King Gorilla	Gorilla	The Venture Bros.	Super-villain and "scared straight" counselor
Kong	Gorilla	Cats Don't Dance	A gorilla who appears when Danny and Sawyer are going to Little Ark Angel voiced by Dee Bradley Baker.
Johnny	Gorilla	Sing	
King Louie	Bornean orangutan	The Jungle Book franchise	Leader of the clan of monkeys, Louie was created for the Disney film and does not appear in the original Rudyard Kipling book. In the 2016 film, he is depicted as a Gigantopithecus.
Magilla Gorilla	Gorilla	The Magilla Gorilla Show	Mr. Peebles banana guzzling pet, waiting to be sold.
Maurice	Gorilla	Marsupilami	Marsupilami's silent sidekick purple gorilla friend in a pink shirt
Mojo Jojo	Chimpanzee	The Powerpuff Girls	A megalomaniacal madman and the archenemy of the Powerpuff Girls.
Mr. Nesmith	Chimpanzee	Planet Sheen	In the service of NASA, originally a normal ape, but when his rocket crashed on an alien planet he developed advanced intelligence and the ability to speak, due to the higher gravity. Sheen Estevez, the star of the show, often incorrectly refers to him as a monkey, much to Nesmith's annoyance.
Mr. Teeny	Chimpanzee	The Simpsons	Krusty the Clown's acting partner and possibly pet and, like Krusty, is addicted to cigarettes.
Optimus Primal	Gorilla	Beast Wars	The leader of the Maximals, a faction descended from the Autobots. He has the ability to transform into a robotic gorilla.
Phil and Mason	Chimpanzee	Madagascar	Two chimpanzees that work for the Penguins. Phil is silent using sign languages, while Mason does the talking
Utan	Orangutan	Vandread	
Windsor Gorilla	Gorilla	My Gym Partner's a Monkey	A wise gorilla and another friend of Adam Lyon

== Monkeys ==
Monkey	Species	Origin	Notes
Abu	Monkey	Aladdin	Aladdin's best friend and sidekick.
Alakazam	Macaque	Alakazam the Great	Is encouraged by monkeys to become their king. As a king he is rude and arrogant. His arrogance intensifies until King Amo teaches him a lesson.
Antauri	Monkey	Super Robot Monkey Team Hyperforce Go!	A black robot monkey.
Atchan	Spider monkey	Hi Hi Puffy AmiYumi	
Baboon	Baboon	Skunk Fu	
Blip	Monkey	Space Ghost	One of Space Ghost's sidekicks.
Bobo Brothers	Spider monkey	Go, Diego, Go!	Two mischievous spider monkeys that always cause trouble. In most episodes, Diego tries to stop them misbehaving. In turn, they always ask for forgiveness for their actions.
Boots	Monkey	Dora the Explorer	A 5-year-old monkey whom Dora met one day in the forest, is her best friend. He is friendly and enthusiastic, and usually wears nothing but his beloved red boots.
Bubbles	Monkey	Dragon Ball Z	
Buddhist Monkey	Monkey	Happy Tree Friends	He is golden yellow and wears a brown-orange robe with brown beads and has a pattern of brown dots in the shape of a square on his forehead.
Captain Huggy Face	Monkey	WordGirl	A monkey-like alien from the planet Lexicon who is WordGirl's sidekick. Also known as Bob.
Chu-chu	Monkey	Revolutionary Girl Utena	A light purple monkey owned by Anthy Himemiya.
Dennis Hooper	Proboscis monkey	GOAT	The coach of the Vineland Thorns.
Ete-kichi	Monkey	Jungle King Tar-chan	
Evil Monkey	Monkey	Family Guy	An evil monkey that torments Chris Griffin.
Furge	Monkey	Seitokai Yakuindomo	
Gibson	Monkey	Super Robot Monkey Team Hyperforce Go!	A blue robot monkey.
Goku	Monkey	Dragon Ball	
Guenter	Monkey	Futurama	A monkey made super-intelligent by the Electronium hat he wears, which was created by Professor Farnsworth.
George	Monkey	Curious George	
Giggles and Tickles	Monkey	64 Zoo Lane	Two monkeys who like to tickle each other.
Gleek	Exxorian monkey	Super Friends	A blue monkey-like alien and the pet of Zan and Jayna, the Wonder Twins.
Hoho	Colobus monkey	Ni Hao, Kai-Lan	
I.R. Baboon	Baboon	I Am Weasel	
Isambard King Kong Brunel	Monkey	Danger Mouse	
Jake Spidermonkey	Spider monkey	My Gym Partner's a Monkey	Adam's best friend.
Kiki	Monkey	Magical Sentosa	He is the former mascot of Sentosa, Singapore.
Lazlo	Spider monkey	Camp Lazlo	
Master Monkey	Golden snub-nosed monkey	Kung Fu Panda	Member of the Furious Five.
Minka Mark	Spider monkey	Littlest Pet Shop	She is an energetic artist.
Monkey	Monkey	Dexter's Laboratory	An ordinary looking laboratory monkey, but unknown to Dexter a superhero who stars in the Dial M for Monkey shorts.
Monkeys	Monkey	Dumbo	
Miss Lucy Simian	Baboon	The Amazing World of Gumball	The teacher and antagonist of Gumball Watterson
Monkey Ninjas	Monkey	Kim Possible	The minions of Monkey Fist
Mother's Goku	Monkey	Gokudo the Adventurer	
Nova	Monkey	Super Robot Monkey Team Hyperforce Go!	A yellow robot monkey.
Otto	Monkey	Super Robot Monkey Team Hyperforce Go!	A green robot monkey.
Playful Heart Monkey	Monkey	Care Bears	One of the Care Bear Cousins. He has yellow-orange fur and his belly symbol is a red heart-shaped balloon with party favours.
Rafiki	Mandrill	The Lion King	An extremely wise spiritualist. A mentor of Simba, and a good friend of Mufasa and the royal pride.
Sasuke Sarutobi	Monkey	Hyakka Ryouran: Samurai Bride	
Sebastian	Monkey	The Brave Little Toaster to the Rescue	An old monkey who was the victim of the cruel experiments of Tartarus Laboratories and as a result has a mutilated and bandaged hand.
See-A-Lot	Monkey	Working with Words (Journey Through the Jungle of Words)	Do-A-Lot's monkey companion.
Sparx	Monkey	Super Robot Monkey Team Hyperforce Go!	A red robot monkey.
Steve	Vervet monkey	Cloudy with a Chance of Meatballs	Flint Lockwood's pet monkey, who is equipped with a thought translator.
Tala	Monkey	Shimmer and Shine	Shimmer's pet monkey.
Yoyo	Monkey	Blinky Bill’s Extraordinary Balloon Adventure	

== Prosimians ==
Prosimian	Species	Origin	Notes
Maurice	Aye-aye	Madagascar	King Julien's advisor.
Momo	Lemur	Avatar: The Last Airbender	A winged lemur.
Murphy	Galago	Daisougen no Chiisana Tenshi Bush Baby	
Mort	Mouse lemur	Madagascar	A resident of King Julien's kingdom. In All Hail King Julien, it is revealed that Mort is immortal and previously absorbed several of his alternate universe counterparts, who manifest as alternate personalities.
King Julien	Ring-tailed lemur	Madagascar	The king of the Madagascar jungle.
