= The Stars: A New Way to See Them =

Astronomy book by H. A. Rey

- Author: H. A. Rey
- Publisher: Houghton Mifflin
- Publication date: 1952

The Stars: A New Way to See Them is an astronomy book by H. A. Rey. It was first published in 1952 (Houghton Mifflin, Boston) and revised in 1962. It was updated again in 1997. Other editions were: Chatto and Windus, London, 1975; "A New Way to see the Stars", Paul Hamlyn, London, 1966; Enl. World-wide ed. Houghton Mifflin, 1967.

In this book, Rey set out to create a graphical, simpler view of the constellations that created a more realistic depiction of the images the constellations were supposed to represent.

Traditional diagram of the constellation Gemini.

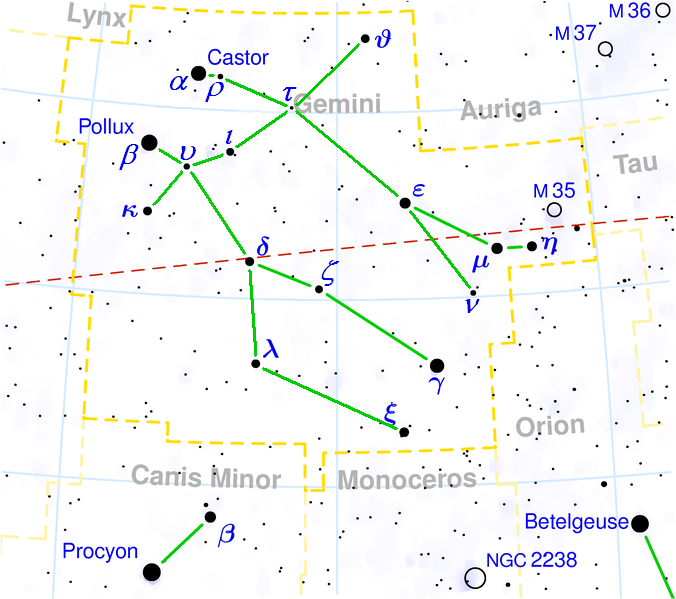
Rey's alternative diagram of Gemini: twins are shown holding hands.

Traditional diagram of the constellation Leo.

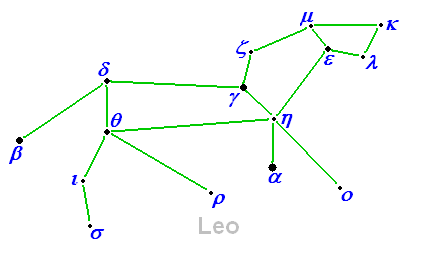
Rey's alternative diagram of Leo: A lion walking.

Traditional diagram of the constellation Virgo.

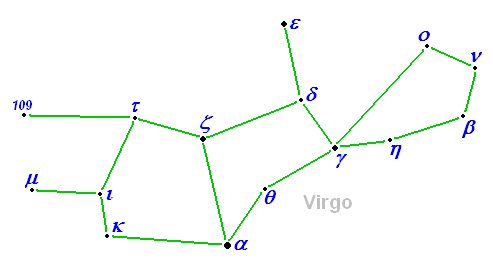
Rey's alternative diagram of Virgo: A lying woman.

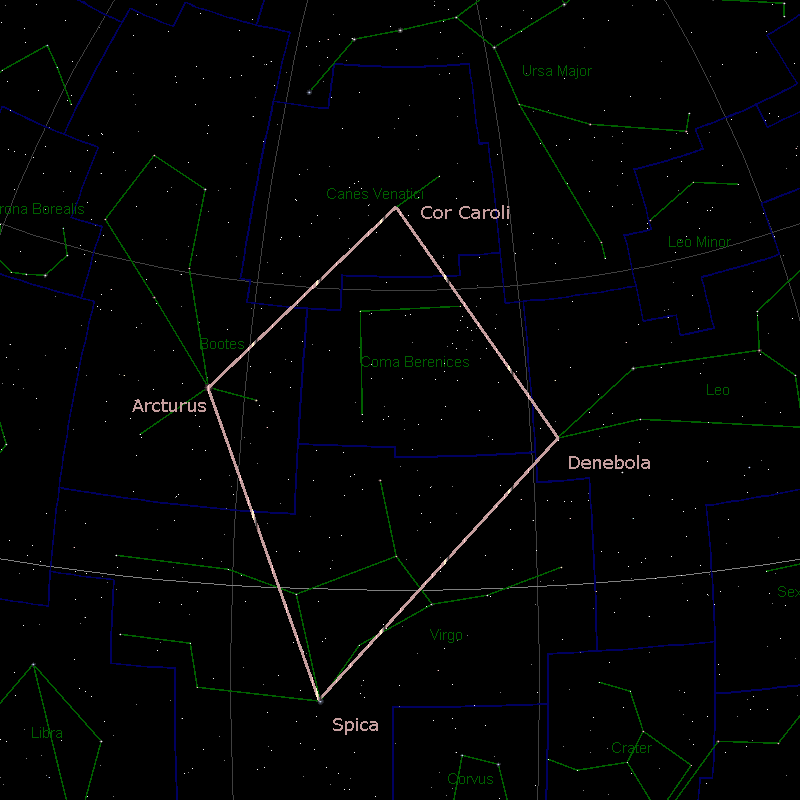
Rey's Virgin's Diamond asterism

Rey's interest in astronomy began during World War I and led to his desire to redraw constellation diagrams, which he found difficult to remember, so that they were more intuitive. This led to the 1952 publication of The Stars: A New Way to See Them (ISBN 0-395-24830-2). His constellation diagrams were adopted widely and now appear in many astronomy guides, such as Donald H. Menzel's A Field Guide to the Stars and Planets. As of 2008 The Stars: A New Way to See Them and a simplified presentation for children called Find the Constellations are still in print. A new edition of Find the Constellations was released in 2008, updated with modern fonts, the new status of Pluto, and some more current measurements of planetary sizes and orbital radii.
