= Felix Waldstein =

German lawyer and politician

Member of the Prussian House of Representatives
- In office 1908–1918
- Constituency: Altona

Member of the Reichstag (German Empire)
- In office 1912–1918
- Constituency: Schleswig - Eckernförde

Member of the Weimar National Assembly
- In office 1919–1920

Member of the Reichstag (Weimar Republic)
- In office 1920 – February 1921

Personal details
- Born: 10 January 1865 Gnesen, Province of Posen, Kingdom of Prussia (Gniezno, Poland)
- Died: 8 December 1943 (aged 78) London, United Kingdom
- Party: Free-minded Union; Progressive People's Party (Germany); German Democratic Party (DDP)
- Children: Margret Rey
- Occupation: lawyer

David Felix Waldstein (10 January 1865 – 8 December 1943) was a German lawyer and liberal politician, a member of the Prussian and German parliament and the Weimar National Assembly.

Waldstein was born in Gnesen, Prussian Province of Posen (Gniezno, Poland), after passing his Abitur in Gnesen he studied law and economics at the Humboldt University Berlin. Waldstein started to work as a lawyer in Altona in 1890 and as notary in 1901. He was elected as a member of the Prussian House of Representatives in 1908 and a member of the German Reichstag in 1912.

In 1919 Waldstein became a member of the Weimar National Assembly and member of the executive board of the German Democratic Party, he remained in the Weimar German Reichstag until February 1921. Waldstein was a member of the national executive board and chairman of the Hamburg section of the Centralverein deutscher Staatsbürger jüdischen Glaubens (CV). He headed the Centralverein in North-West Germany until 1934.

In 1939 Waldstein emigrated to the United Kingdom and died in London in 1943.
