= Curious George (book) =

Children's book by Margret and H. A. Rey

- First edition cover
- Author: Margret Rey; H. A. Rey
- Language: English
- Series: Curious George
- Genre: Children's literature
- Publisher: Houghton Mifflin
- Publication date: 1941
- Publication place: United States
- Media type: Print
- Followed by: Curious George Takes a Job

Curious George is a children's book written and illustrated by Margret Rey and H. A. Rey, and published by Houghton Mifflin in 1941. The first book in the Curious George series, it tells the story of a monkey named George, who was taken into captivity by the Man with the Yellow Hat.

As of October 2024, more than 25 million copies have been sold, and translations include Japanese, French, Afrikaans, Portuguese, Swedish, German, Chinese, Danish, and Norwegian. It is in the Indie Choice Book Awards Picture Book Hall of Fame and has been the subject of scholarly criticism.

== Background ==
The character of Curious George first appeared as "Fifi" in H.A. and Margret Rey's Cecily G. and the Nine Monkeys, published in Paris in 1939. London-based publisher Grace Hogarth offered a four-book deal to the Reys upon reading their initial manuscript of the book and requested that the monkey's name be changed from Fifi to George.

Curious George was published in America in August 1941, with an initial print run of 7,500 copies and a price of $2.00 (equivalent to about $40 in 2025). Margret Rey was a co-author but is uncredited on these early copies, because the publisher believed "there were too many women in the field" of children's literature.

== Plot ==
George is a curious monkey living in an African jungle. "The Man with the Yellow Hat" meets George and places his yellow straw hat on the ground. A curious George puts it on his head, blocking his sight. With George unable to see, the Man puts him in a bag, capturing him.

The two go on a rowboat to a big ship, George sad but still curious. Once on the ship, the Man gets George out of the bag, tells him that they are going to a big zoo in a big city, and asks George not to get in trouble. George promises, but he sees seagulls and tries to fly like them, which results in him falling into the water and struggling to swim. The crew of the ship save him by throwing him a lifebelt. After a long trip, the Man and George say goodbye to the sailors, reach land, and go to the Man's home. After having a meal and smoking a pipe, George becomes tired and falls asleep in his bed in large, human-sized pajamas.

The next morning, the Man telephones the zoo. When he leaves, George, being curious, uses the telephone. He dials various numbers repeatedly, but he accidentally calls the fire station. Because George says nothing to the firemen, they assume there is a fire, and the map locates George's signal. The signal highlights George's location on the map, and the fire engines rush to the Man's house, only to find out that there was no emergency. As a result, the firefighters tell George that because he fooled the fire department, they will have to shut him up in prison where he cannot do any more harm; George ends up getting arrested and jailed subsequently.

George attempts to escape his cell by grabbing the window bars. A watchman comes in and climbs on a wooden bed to catch George. However, he is so heavy that the bed tips over and pins him against the wall, stalling him. George is able to slip past and escape through the open door. He climbs onto the roof, walking across the power lines above a guard's head.

George finds a man selling balloons. He tries to grab a red balloon, but accidentally grabs all the balloons instead. The wind blows the balloons and George away over the big city, where the houses and people look like toy houses and dolls. He lands on a traffic light pole, mixing up traffic. The Man sees George from his car, and George slides down the pole into his arms. The Man pays the balloon man for the balloons, and then drives George to his wonderful new home at the zoo and proceeds to give all the balloons to each animal.

== Reception ==
=== Sales and republication ===
Five years after the book's publication, Houghton Mifflin almost stopped printing the book due to its low demand, but it later became much more popular. Since its publishing, the book has never gone out of print and more than 25 million copies have been sold. The book has been published in paperback, hardcover, pop-up book, and audiobook.

=== Critical commentary ===
Curious George has received mostly positive reviews. Critic David Mehegan of the Milwaukee Journal Sentinel argues that children should understand that Curious George's curiosity does get him into a lot of trouble, such as when he floats away on the balloons, but his curiosity makes life more interesting. Ultimately, children relate to this character because he, like them, "impulsively breaks commonsense rules set by grown-ups in a desire to understand the marvelous new world around him".

Critic Shannon Maughan of Publishers Weekly claims this book can be used by teachers to help promote conservation of forests and the species inside of them. More books have been published relating to conservation efforts and environmental awareness including Curious George Plants a Seed in 2007 and Curious George Plants a Tree in 2010.

In author Rivka Galchen's New Yorker piece, she found contradictory parallels in Curious George to the Middle Passage and the "reassuring and almost fantastical sense of wealth". Galchen claims the idea that a monkey being taken from Africa and almost drowning in the Atlantic Ocean can be very closely paralleled with the Middle Passage. On the other hand, the material goods that George receives once he arrives in America contradict these original ideas.

=== Accolades ===
Curious George was a finalist for induction into the American Booksellers Association Indies Choice Book Awards Picture Book Hall of Fame in its inaugural year of 2009, in 2010, and in 2011. In 2012, the book was officially inducted.

School Library Journal included the book at #41 on its Top 100 Picture Books list in 2012.

== Analysis ==
Professor and children's literature scholar June Cummins assesses Curious George from a postcolonial perspective, arguing that many elements of story parallel African slave-captivity narratives (such as George's capture and journey across the Atlantic reflecting the horrors of the Middle Passage) and treat George as a colonial subject. In this way, Cummins concludes, the Curious George series portrays and excuses both imperialism and colonialism, and reflects the cultural ambivalence that many Americans display towards the nation's history of slavery.

In her book tracing themes of racism, colonialism, and American exceptionalism in the Curious George series, author Rae Lynn Schwartz-DuPre also argues for a postcolonial reading of Curious George and contends that the series should be framed as a "classic example of colonial children's literature". She discusses George as an agent of Americanization who is used to promote insidious notions of American exceptionalism, yet is protected from critique as a beloved and nostalgic cultural icon of childhood adventure and naiveté.

== Authors ==
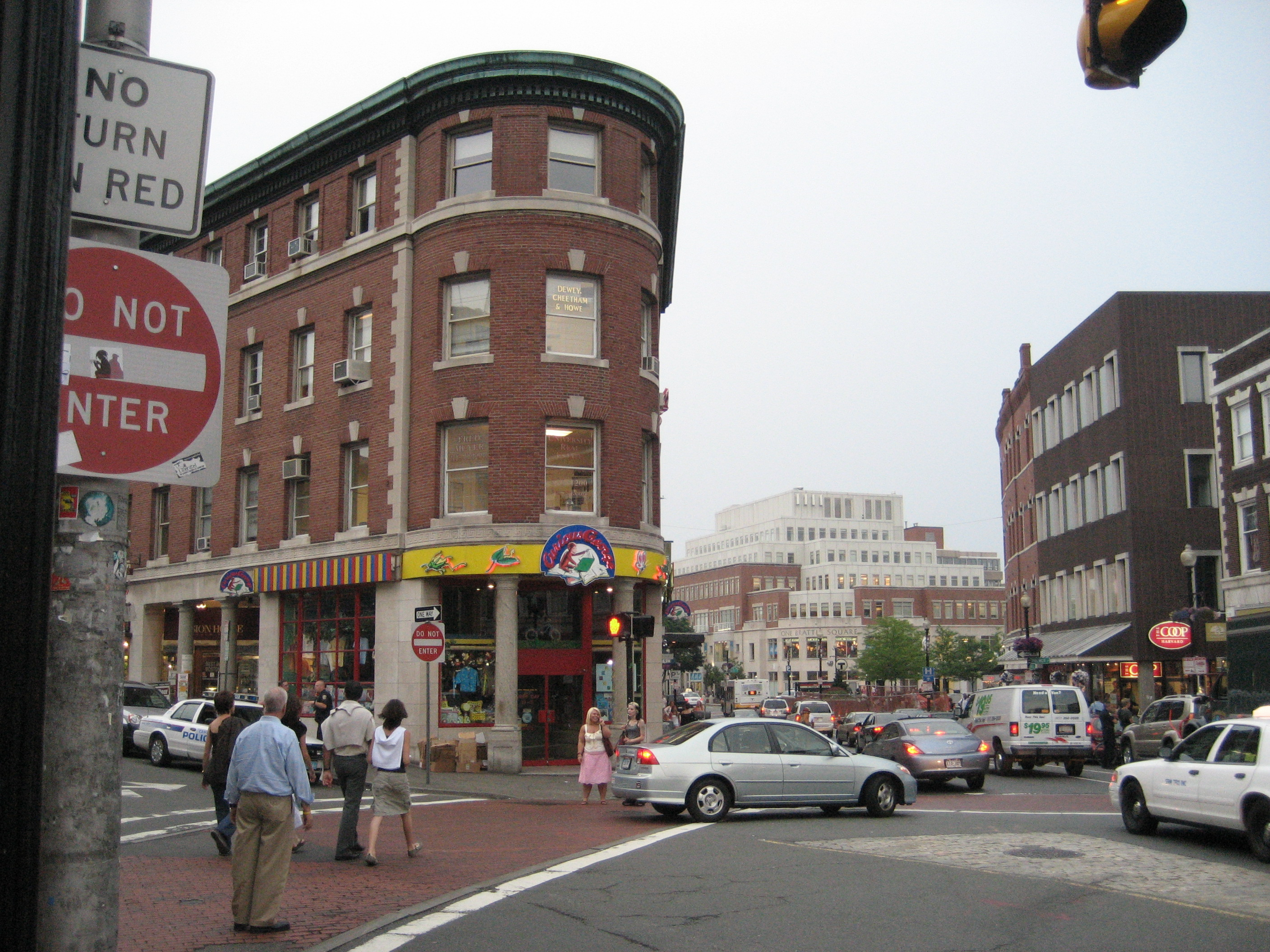
Curious George & Friends bookstore is in Harvard Square. (2007)

Margret Elizabeth Rey (May 16, 1906 – December 21, 1996) and her husband Hans Augusto "H.A." Rey (September 16, 1898 – August 26, 1977) met each other in Brazil and then moved to Paris. After moving several places to escape the Nazis, they settled down in New York.

There, they wrote Curious George and seven other books about him including Curious George Takes a Job, which won the Lewis Carroll Shelf Award in 1960. Having been raised in the cosmopolitan city of Hamburg (and its suburb Altona) and later spending time in England, Brazil, and France, the Rey's were both polyglots, with Margret achieving fluency in three languages and Hans in "no fewer than four". Professor Yulia Komska notes that, despite the authors' self-professed multilingual backgrounds, the Curious George series is monolingual and features a monkey who cannot speak.

The Reys moved to Cambridge, Massachusetts in 1963, in a house near Harvard Square, and lived there until Hans's death in 1977. A children's bookstore named Curious George & Friends (formerly Curious George Goes to Wordsworth) was started in the 1990s by friends of the Reys, and operated in the Square until 2011. A new store opened in 2012 at the same address, called The World's Only Curious George Store - Harvard Square. In June 2019, this new store closed.

== See also ==
- A Boy Went Out to Gather Pears (1966), an English translation of a 1963 children's picture book from Swiss folklore
- Green Eggs and Ham (1960), from the Dr. Seuss bibliography
