= David Kidd (writer) =

David Kidd (1926–21 November 1996) was an American-born writer, teacher and connoisseur who devoted his life to experiencing the culture of China and Japan. In Kyoto, he was the founding director of the Oomoto School of Traditional Japanese Arts.

In 1946, aged 19, Kidd moved to China, where he became an English teacher and married Aimee Yu, the daughter of a former Chief Justice of the Supreme Court of China. He therefore had a unique position as an American inside China's old establishment when, in 1949, the old order was swept aside by the Chinese Communist Revolution. His inside account of the last days of the ancient regime was published as All the Emperor's Horses in 1960, and revised and reissued as a Crown paperback retitled Peking Story in 1988.

Kidd lived in America between 1950 and 1956, before moving to Japan and teaching at Kobe and Osaka Universities. He moved to Kyoto, where he opened a school to teach the tea ceremony, calligraphy and other traditional arts, initially to foreigners and eventually even to native Japanese students.
