= Curious George (TV series) =

American animated television series

- Genre: Adventure; Comedy; Edutainment
- Based on: Curious George by: H.A. Rey; Margret Rey; Alan Shalleck
- Developed by: Joe Fallon
- Voices of: Frank Welker; Jeff Bennett; Rob Paulsen; Jim Cummings; Debi Derryberry; Bill Chott; Lex Lang; Dee Bradley Baker; B. J. Ward; E. G. Daily; Grey DeLisle; Susan Silo; Lara Jill Miller; Kevin Michael Richardson; James Arnold Taylor; Tara Strong; Carlos Alazraqui; Jess Harnell; Amber Hood; Annie Mumolo; Rolonda Watts; Kath Soucie; Carol Burnett
- Narrated by: William H. Macy (season 1); Rino Romano (seasons 2–15)
- Theme music composer: Rocco Gagliese; Steve D'Angelo; Terry Tompkins
- Opening theme: "Like Curious George!" performed by Dr. John
- Ending theme: "Like Curious George!" (instrumental)
- Composer: Nick Nolan
- Country of origin: United States
- Original language: English
- No. of seasons: 15
- No. of episodes: 198 (400 segments + 3 specials) (list of episodes)

Production
- Executive producers: Ron Howard (seasons 1–9, 14–15); Brian Grazer (seasons 1–9, 14–15); Ellen Cockrill; Carol Greenwald (seasons 1–13); David Kirschner; Jon Shapiro; Dorothea Gillim (seasons 1–10); Glenn Ross (seasons 14–15)
- Producers: Patty Jausoro; David Wilcox; Melanie Pal
- Editors: Kirk Demorest; Bruce W. Cathcart
- Running time: 22 minutes (11 minutes per segment)
- Production companies: Imagine Entertainment (seasons 1–9, 14–15); Universal Animation Studios; WGBH Boston (seasons 1–12); Universal 1440 Entertainment (seasons 10–15)

Original release
- Network: PBS (PBS Kids)
- Release: September 4, 2006 – April 1, 2015
- Network: Family Jr.
- Release: September 3, 2018 – February 21, 2020
- Network: Peacock
- Release: July 15, 2020 – March 17, 2022

Curious George is an American children's animated television series based on the children's book series of the same name for PBS Kids and a sequel series to the 2006 animated film Curious George. Frank Welker reprises his role as the titular character from the film, while Jeff Bennett co-stars as the voice of "The Man with the Yellow Hat" (whose name is revealed in the film to be Ted Shackelford), replacing Will Ferrell. The show premiered on PBS Kids on September 4, 2006, around seven months after the film's release, and originally ended after nine seasons on April 1, 2015, before returning in 2018. Later seasons were released on Peacock, and the series concluded again on March 17, 2022, after a total of 15 seasons. This is the second animated series from Imagine Entertainment, following 1999's The PJs.

Season 10 premiered on September 3, 2018 on Family Jr. in Canada. Seasons 10–13 debuted on NBCUniversal's streaming service Peacock in the United States when it launched in July 2020. Seasons 1–9 were available to stream for Peacock Premium subscribers from September 20, 2020, to September 30, 2026, and are also available to stream on Hulu. Season 10 premiered on PBS on October 5 the same year.

Curious George is a production of Universal 1440 Entertainment (Universal Studios Family Productions before 2013), Imagine Entertainment, and WGBH-TV (WGBH Kids) (before season 13), and animation production by Toon City in some seasons. From seasons 1–9, each episode has two animated segments per half hour episode, and a short live-action segment after each. The live-action shorts illustrate and explain various STEM concepts, and shows a class with kids engaging in experiments that demonstrate a concept within the previous episode's script. After the ninth season, the STEM featurettes were phased out.

== Premise ==
George and the Man with the Yellow Hat live in an apartment in a big city. The Doorman of the building they live in keeps a pigeon coop on the roof and is the guardian of a dachshund dog named Hundley. The apartment is near Endless Park, the museum where Professor Wiseman works, the zoo, an Italian restaurant owned by Chef Pisghetti, that serves spaghetti and all kinds of pasta, a doughnut shop, Dulson's Toy Store, Mabel's Department Store (a portmanteau of Macy's and its erstwhile competitor Gimbels), the supermarket, and the pet shop, which are recurring locations.

The Man also owns a small house in the country which he and George live part time in. The house is near Lake Wanasinklake, a stream, and a river that flows past the city and to the ocean. George is friends there with farmer neighbors Mr. and Mrs. Renkins, their five-year-old granddaughter Allie, the Quint family, and the teenage paperboy, Bill.

== Characters ==
=== Main ===
- Curious George (vocal effects by Frank Welker) is a tailless monkey who is the protagonist of the series. As his name implies, he is excessively curious and often causes lots of unintentional problems.
- The Man with the Yellow Hat (voiced by Jeff Bennett) is a man who first befriended George. He is almost always wearing some form of yellow clothing, and acts as George's fatherly figure, primary teacher and mentor.
- Narrator (voiced by William H. Macy in season 1 and Rino Romano in seasons 2–15) is an unseen storyteller who narrates the events of each episode of the show. His narrations largely describe about the feelings of George and the Man with the Yellow Hat along with their actions, often serving as an internal monologue for speechless characters such as animals.

=== Supporting ===
- Chef Pisghetti (voiced by Jim Cummings) is a chef from Italy who owns and operates an Italian restaurant in the city with his wife.
- Netti (voiced by Susan Silo) is Chef Pisghetti's wife.
- Gnocchi (vocal effects by Debi Derryberry in seasons 1–3 and "Gnocchi the Critic" and Dee Bradley Baker in seasons 4–15) is Chef Pisghetti's beige female cat.
- The Doorman (voiced by Bill Chott in season 1 and Lex Lang in seasons 2–15) is the doorman for the apartment building in which George and the Man with the Yellow Hat live. He is Hundley's owner.
- Hundley (vocal effects by Bill Chott in season 1 and Lex Lang in seasons 2–15) is an orange male dachshund dog. Hundley is very proper, polite, slightly cynical and gentlemanly. He keeps vigil on the lobby of George's apartment building when his owner, the Doorman, is absent.
- Compass (vocal effects by Rob Paulsen) is a blue male homing pigeon, also cared for by the Doorman. Compass lacks a sense of direction, therefore often referred to as an "Almost-Homing Pigeon". A running gag throughout the series shows him unsuccessfully trying to guess what kind of animal George is.
- Professor Wiseman (voiced by Rolonda Watts) is a scientist who is a good friend of George and the Man with the Yellow Hat. In different episodes she is seen to be a rocket scientist, and is seen to work at a local museum. She has two colleagues named Professor Einstein and Professor Pizza. Her name is a play on the words wise man.
- Steve (voiced by Elizabeth Daily) and Betsy (voiced by Grey DeLisle) are siblings from George's neighborhood in the city. They live with their Aunt Margaret and their dog, Charkie.
- Charkie (vocal effects by Rob Paulsen) is a female black Cocker Spaniel dog owned by Steve and Betsy. She is very energetic, extremely fast and chaotic. She often runs after whatever catches her attention, causing Steve and Betsy to chase after her.
- Mr. Glass (voiced by Rob Paulsen, with a vocal impression reminiscent of Gilbert Gottfried) is a wealthy businessman and good friend of Chef Pisghetti who owns a building known as "The Glass Palace" and hires window washers in the city. He is known to like things that are unique to him.
- Jumpy Squirrel (vocal effects by Jim Cummings) is a male squirrel who lives in the country.
- Bill (voiced by Annie Mumolo) is George's neighbor from across the street in the country who is the town's paperboy.
- Bill's Bunnies (vocal effects by Frank Welker) are seven baby bunnies owned by Bill. Their names are Fuzzy, Whitey, Brownie, Spotty, Black Ears, Cotton Tail, and Herbert Nenninger. He also owns their mother (Ma Rabbit), whose burrowing abilities are highlighted in several episodes.
- Mr. & Mrs. Renkins (respectively voiced by Jeff Bennett and Kath Soucie) are a couple who own and operate a farm near the country house.
- Allie (voiced by Lara Jill Miller) is the 5-year-old granddaughter of the Renkins, who is first introduced in George Meets Allie-Whoops! where she and George quickly form a close friendship.
- Mr. Zoobel (voiced by Carlos Alazraqui) is George's upstairs neighbor in the city, and a painter of modern art. He often uses large, heavy rubber stamps that resemble animal feet in his art, which initially made George think there was an elephant upstairs. He also has several pet animals, including a snake, an elephant, and two mice.
- Marco (voiced by Grey DeLisle) is a Mexican boy who lives in The Puerto Del Sol district, a predominantly Latino neighborhood in the city. He performs with his family's Latin band around the city.
- The Quints (male Quints voiced by Jim Cummings and female Quints voiced by Candi Milo): Clint Quint is one of George and The Man With The Yellow Hat's country friends, a retired fisherman and one of a set of quintuplets. His siblings are two sisters, track runner Sprint and mint operator Mint, and two brothers, train-station master Flint, and the country town's police chief, Wint.

=== Minor ===
- Dinwoodie (voiced by Jess Harnell)
- Jagger (vocal effects by Rob Paulsen) is a rooster who's very protective of those hens in the hen yard.
- Hamilton (vocal effects by Rob Paulsen) is a male pig.
- Dumpling (vocal effects by Frank Welker) is a male duck.
- Dottie (vocal effects by Jeff Bennett) is a female deer.

== Voice cast ==
- Frank Welker — Curious George, Tony Pizza, Dumpling Duck, Stig, Flint Quint, Bill's Bunnies, Various characters
- Jeff Bennett — Ted Shackelford (credited as "The Man with the Yellow Hat"), Alvin Einstein, Mr. Renkins, Various characters
- William H. Macy (Season 1 only)
  Rino Romano — The Narrator
- Rob Paulsen — Compass, Charkie, Mr. Glass, Hamilton the Pig, Jagger the Rooster, Blanche the Goat, Mr. Dulson, Mr. Ruffweek, Various characters
- Jim Cummings — Chef Pisghetti, Jumpy Squirrel, Mr. Quint, Rodney, Various characters
- Debi Derryberry — Gnocchi (Seasons 1–3 and "Gnocchi The Critic" only), Lucky the Kitten, Mrs. Dulson
- Bill Chott (Season 1 only)
  Lex Lang — The Doorman, Hundley
- Dee Bradley Baker — Gnocchi (Seasons 4–15)
- B. J. Ward — Aunt Margaret
- E. G. Daily — Steve, Andie, Various characters
- Grey DeLisle — Betsy, Marco, Dorothy, Molly Zucchini, Various characters
- Susan Silo — Netti Pisghetti
- Lara Jill Miller — Allie
- Kevin Michael Richardson — Dr. Baker, Toots, Stew, Various characters
- James Arnold Taylor — Leo Zucchini
- Tara Strong — Claire Zucchini, Various characters
- Cree Summer — Ada, Sisley, Ms. Fisher and the Announcer.
- Jess Harnell — Dinwoodle
- Carlos Alazraqui — Mr. Zoobel
- Amber Hood — Carla
- Annie Mumolo — Bill
- Rolonda Watts — Professor Wiseman
- Kath Soucie — Mrs. Renkins
- Carol Burnett – Great Aunt Sylvia

== Episodes ==
The setting for most episodes is either the city, where George lives in an apartment building with the Man in the Yellow Hat, or the country, where they share a small house near a lake called Lake Wanasinklake (on rare occasions, both settings are featured). This allows George to mirror the experiences of kids who live in an urban environment and those who live on farms and in suburbs. A few episodes take place in alternate but familiar settings, like an airport or a train station.

| Season | Segments | Episodes | Originally released | | |
| Season | Segments | Episodes | First released | Last released | Network |
|---|---|---|---|---|---|
| 1 | 60 | 30 | September 4, 2006 | February 23, 2007 | PBS Kids |
| 2 | 40 | 20 | September 3, 2007 | April 22, 2008 | PBS Kids |
| 3 | 22 | 11 | September 1, 2008 | April 22, 2009 | PBS Kids |
| 4 | 18 | 9 | September 8, 2009 | June 14, 2010 | PBS Kids |
| 5 | 20 | 10 | September 6, 2010 | May 6, 2011 | PBS Kids |
| 6 | 20 | 10 | September 5, 2011 | June 25, 2012 | PBS Kids |
| 7 | 12 | 6 | December 3, 2012 | April 24, 2013 | PBS Kids |
| 8 | 12 | 6 | February 10, 2014 | May 21, 2014 | PBS Kids |
| 9 | 12 | 6 | October 28, 2014 | April 1, 2015 | PBS Kids |
| 10 | 28 | 15 | September 3, 2018 | December 10, 2018 | Family Jr. |
| 11 | 29 | 15 | May 6, 2019 | August 12, 2019 | Family Jr. |
| 12 | 29 | 15 | February 3, 2020 | February 21, 2020 | Family Jr. |
| 13 | 30 | 15 | July 15, 2020 | December 11, 2020 | Peacock |
| 14 | 29 | 15 | October 21, 2021 | | Peacock |
| 15 | 28 | 15 | March 17, 2022 | | Peacock |

== Broadcast and release ==
The show premiered on PBS through PBS Kids in the United States. The series is broadcast by CBC Kids, TVOKids, Knowledge Network, and Family Jr. (2007-2025) in Canada. Season 10 premiered on PBS and the series made its debut on the PBS Kids 24/7 channel the same day. All seasons were available on Peacock and PBS Kids with the first 9 seasons exclusive to Peacock Premium and Hulu.

Curious George: A Very Monkey Christmas, an animated television film, was released on November 25, 2009 in the United States, a DVD premiere in France having been released on November 17. It was distributed by PBS and produced by Imagine Entertainment and Universal Animation Studios. The film is a holiday television special featuring George, as featured in the TV series, wondering what to give The Man in The Yellow Hat who is also wondering what to give George. It is shown every Christmas season on PBS Kids.

On September 30, 2024, the series stopped airing on PBS member stations, after 18 years. The reason has never been stated but some speculate that it is due to the license expiring. Despite this, reruns of the series aired on the 24/7 PBS Kids network until September 30, 2026, and it remains on the PBS Kids website. It was also removed on Peacock the same day.

== Awards ==
Emmy Award

- 2008 – Outstanding Children's Animated Program
- 2010 – Outstanding Children's Animated Program
