= Curious George Takes a Job =

1947 book by H. A. Rey

- First edition
- Author: H. A. Rey; Margret Rey
- Language: English
- Series: Curious George
- Genre: Children's literature
- Publisher: Houghton Mifflin
- Publication date: 1947
- Publication place: United States
- Media type: Print
- Preceded by: Curious George
- Followed by: Curious George Rides a Bike

Curious George Takes a Job is a children's book written and illustrated by Margret Rey and H. A. Rey and published by Houghton Mifflin in 1947. It is the second of the Curious George books and tells the story of George taking a job as a window washer.

== Plot ==
The book continues where the first book ends. George is living in the zoo, until he gets a key from a zookeeper and escapes his cage. In the city, George sneaks into a restaurant where he is caught in the kitchen eating a pot of spaghetti. The cook is a kind man and did not scold much, but he makes George clean up the kitchen and then wash the dishes, and he does a splendid job.

As a reward, the cook takes him to meet his friend, an elevator man, who gives him a job as a window washer for a tall apartment building. As George works, he observes many people in the different windows, such as a young boy refusing to eat spinach and a man sleeping. Once he reaches the final window, he notices a room behind the window being painted. George lets curiosity get to him again (after the elevator man tells him not to be too curious), he enters the apartment just as the painters leave for lunch and decides to paint it for them.

An hour later, the painters return and are horrified to see that George has given the room a jungle theme, including painting the furniture coverings as animals (a giraffe, two leopards, and a zebra). Infuriated, the painters, the elevator man, and the woman owning the apartment chase him out of the room down a fire escape, followed by the other tenants. George then jumps from the end of the stairway, thinking he will be home free, but he ends up fracturing his leg by jumping down onto the concrete sidewalk. An ambulance soon arrives to take George to the hospital. As bystanders look on, they feel that the injury is what George deserves for painting the room and being too curious.

In the hospital, George lies in bed with his leg in a cast hanging above him. George's incident makes it to the front page of a local newspaper, as the Man with the Yellow Hat sees the story and contacts the hospital to claim George.

Once George's leg has healed, he climbs out of bed and winds up tampering with a bottle of ether, which knocks him out cold. The Man with the Yellow Hat, the doctor, and the nurse find him and manage to bring him around after putting him under a cold shower. Afterwards, George signs a contract with a film studio to make a movie about his life, which he and all of the townsfolk he met later come to watch in the theater.

== Reception ==
The book has received reviews from publications including School Library Journal, Kirkus Reviews, The New Yorker, and New York Herald Tribune.
