= Alan Shalleck =

American writer and producer (1929–2006)

- Born: Alan Jay Shalleck; November 14, 1929; New York City, U.S.
- Died: February 5, 2006 (aged 76); Boynton Beach, Florida, U.S.
- Education: Syracuse University
- Occupations: Writer; producer
- Notable work: Curious George
- Children: 2

Alan Jay Shalleck (November 14, 1929 – February 5, 2006) was an American writer and producer for children's programming on television, most known for his work on later Curious George books and the 1980s television shorts.

== Background ==
Alan Jay Shalleck was born in Manhattan, where he grew up on the Upper West Side. He studied drama at Syracuse University in Syracuse, New York where he became friends with actor Jerry Stiller.

== Career ==
Shalleck first went to work in the mailroom for CBS in the 1950s, eventually becoming an associate producer on the children's television series Winky Dink and You. In the early sixties he moved to Montreal where he produced "Like Young", at CFCF-TV, a highly successful teen music/dance show that was eventually picked up and syndicated by Dick Clark Productions. Following his years at CBS, and CFCF-TV Shalleck was a producer at The Network for Continuing Medical Education and then formed his own production company (AJ Shalleck Productions) and produced a number of low-budget children's animated films and television episodes.

He was an associate director on the first version of the game show The Price Is Right and later I've Got a Secret.

In 1977, he approached Margret Rey about producing a television series based on Curious George, which led to the 1980 television show. Shalleck and Rey wrote more than 100 short episodes for the series. In addition, they collaborated on a number of children's books and audiobooks. (Some of these books list Rey as the author and Shalleck as the editor, while others reverse the credits.) He was paid $500 per story: "no royalties, no residuals."

In 1990, he began producing as videotape series for Classics Illustrated.

In his retirement, Shalleck lived in Florida and created the company "Reading By GRAMPS" and visited local elementary schools, bookstores, and other events to read books to children and promote literacy. However, he also experienced financial problems and was forced to supplement his income with part-time jobs, including working as a bookseller at a local Borders Books.

== Personal life ==
Shalleck had two children from a marriage that ended in divorce. At the time of his death, he lived in an age-restricted community in Boynton Beach, Florida.

=== Murder ===
On the evening of February 5, 2006, Shalleck, 76, was the victim of a robbery/homicide at his residence. His killing occurred five days before the release of a Curious George feature film. His two killers were tracked down using Shalleck's phone records, and they confessed to the crime. Local media reported that the men had come to Shalleck's home after responding to a personal ad he placed in a gay magazine, and proceeded to beat and stab him to death, as well as ransack his home for valuables. They then hid his body outside the house, which was discovered by maintenance workers on February 7.

On October 19, 2007, one of his murderers, 31-year-old Rex Ditto, was sentenced to life in prison and is not eligible for parole. Ditto's co-defendant, Vincent Puglisi, was convicted of first-degree murder and robbery with a deadly weapon on June 24, 2008. He was sentenced in July 2008 to life in prison and is also not eligible for parole. Puglisi unsuccessfully appealed his conviction to the Supreme Court of Florida in 2013.
