= Cecily G. and the Nine Monkeys =

Children's short story by H.A. Rey

- First edition
- Author: H.A. Rey
- Original title: Rafi et les 9 singes
- Illustrator: H.A. Rey
- Language: French
- Genre: Children's story
- Publisher: Gallimard
- Publication date: 1939
- Publication place: France
- English publication date: November 1942
- Media type: Print (hardcover)
- ISBN: 978-0-618-80066-7
- OCLC: 78993289
- Dewey Decimal: [E] 22
- LC Class: PZ7.R33 Ce 2007

Cecily G. and the Nine Monkeys, published in the United Kingdom as Raffy and the 9 Monkeys (French: Rafi et les 9 singes), is a 1939 children's short story written and illustrated by German-American author H. A. Rey. It is the first story to feature Rey's now-famous character, Curious George. When it was first published in France, Cecily's original name was Rafi (Raffy when it was first published in the United Kingdom), but when it appeared in the United States, the character was renamed Cecily.

== Synopsis ==
The story follows the exploits of an orphaned reticulated giraffe only known as Cecily Giraffe, or simply "Cecily G." for short (Raffy in the British version). She is saddened by the loss of her fellow jungle animals and family, all of whom had been captured and placed in a zoo.

In another section of the jungle lived a female monkey named Mother Pamplemoose. She and her eight offspring, George, James, Jonny, Arthur, David, Punch, Judy and Jinny (Sirocco, Cactus, Zigzag, Zozo, Carabaa, Carabee, Caraboo and Fifi in the original edition), were left homeless by the loss of all the trees in their forest due to woodcutters. It is here the character of Curious George is introduced, who declares that it is time for the family to pack their belongings and move on.

Eventually, the monkeys can go no further due to a deep ravine. It is baby Jinny, the youngest monkey, who notices the dejected Cecily G. on the other side of the ravine. Cecily G. notices the monkeys as well, immediately stops crying and asks the monkeys if they would like to cross. To assist them in crossing, Cecily G. leaps forward across the divide, bridging it with her body.

Curious George is the first monkey to cross and introduces the family to their rescuer. When each learns of the other's plight, Cecily invites the monkeys to stay and live with her.

The climax occurs when a fire breaks out in the upper floors of Cecily's tall, giraffe-shaped house. The monkeys work as a team with Cecily; two of the strongest monkeys work an emergency water pump while the remaining six guide the hose to the top of Cecily's neck, using her height to reach the fire.

That incident cements the bond of friendship, so much so that Arthur, one of the young monkeys, composes a song in Cecily's honor. The final page of the book features the lyrics and musical notation of the song with the monkeys serving as notes and Cecily as the treble clef.

== Publishing history ==
The first edition was published by Gallimard in Paris in 1939. Three years later, an English version was published by Chatto & Windus in London.

The story's most recent English printing was in 1989 by Houghton Mifflin Harcourt.
