= Curious George =

Children's picture book character

- First appearance: Cecily G. and the Nine Monkeys (1939)
- Created by: Hans Augusto Rey; Margret Rey
- Voiced by: Corey Burton (1982–1984); Frank Welker (2006–present)

In-universe information
- Full name: Curious George
- Species: Monkey
- Gender: Male

Curious George is a fictional monkey who is the title character of a series of popular children's picture books written and illustrated by Margret and H. A. Rey. Various media, including films and TV shows, have been based upon the original book series.

George is described as "a good little monkey, and always very curious". In the first book, George is caught by "The Man with the Yellow Hat" and taken from Africa to America where the two live together. George and the Man with the Yellow Hat become good friends.

George's first appearance was as a monkey named "Sirocco" in the book Cecily G. and the Nine Monkeys (Raffy and the 9 Monkeys in the United Kingdom), which was first published in France during 1939. The popularity of the character led the Reys to feature "George" in his own series.

== History ==
=== Creation ===
The original series was written by the husband-and-wife team of Hans Augusto (H. A.) Rey and Margret Rey. The Jewish couple fled Paris in June 1940, on bicycles they had made themselves, carrying the Curious George manuscript with them. They received visas in Bayonne, under instructions from Aristides de Sousa Mendes, the Portuguese consul in Bordeaux, which enabled them to escape France via Portugal. At first, only H. A. Rey was credited for the work in order to distinguish the Reys' books from the large number of children's books written by female authors. The first seven books were illustrated by H.A. Rey. Later, Alan J. Shalleck was credited as an editor and Hans Rey and Margret Rey for the writing and illustrating. The Reys produced many other children's books, but the Curious George series was the most popular. Each book has been in continuous print since it was first published.

=== Literature ===
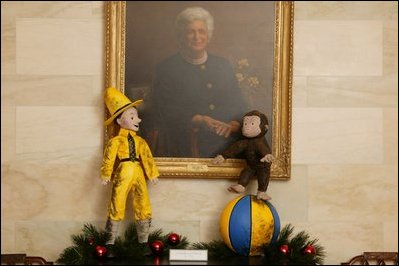
The White House 2003 Christmas decoration using Curious George as the theme with the Barbara Bush portrait.

Margret and H. A. Rey released seven Curious George books during H. A. Rey's lifetime. Recently, more Curious George books have been released by Houghton Mifflin Harcourt including board books with scenes from the original books, books adapted from the 1980s telefilm series, and new adventures.

=== Original adventures ===
Curious George appeared in 1941. This book begins with George living in Africa and tells the story of his capture by the Man with the Yellow Hat, who takes him on a ship to "the big city" where he will live in a zoo. The second book, Curious George Takes a Job (1947), begins with George living in the zoo, from which he escapes and has several adventures before the Man with the Yellow Hat finds him and takes George to live at his house. The remaining five stories describe George's adventures while living at the house of the Man with the Yellow Hat. Although the Man with the Yellow Hat is unnamed in both the original books and telefilm books, he receives his name in the Curious George TV series and is known as "Theodore Shackleford".

Sometimes dubbed the "Original Adventures", these original seven titles are completely by the series creators, Margret & H. A. Rey.

- Curious George (1941)
- Curious George Takes a Job (1947)
- Curious George Rides a Bike (1952)
- Curious George Gets a Medal (1957)
- Curious George Flies a Kite (1958)
- Curious George Learns the Alphabet (1963)
- Curious George Goes to the Hospital (1966)

Before appearing in his own series, Curious George appeared as a character in another children's book written and illustrated by H. A. Rey, Cecily G. and the Nine Monkeys (1939). When the original books were released in the United Kingdom, George was renamed Zozo to avoid offense, the British monarch at the time being George VI.

=== Books adapted from telefilms ===
A second series of books, based on the telefilm series, was edited by Margret & H.A. Rey and Alan J. Shalleck. These appeared between 1984 and 1993. They are mostly out of print, though several have been re-released with new cover art as part of the next series, the "New Adventures".

=== "New Adventures" ===
A third series of books, the Curious George "New Adventures", began to appear in 1998, and continues to the present. These books are "illustrated in the style of H. A. Rey" by a variety of credited and uncredited artists including Mary O'Keefe Young, Martha Weston, Anna Grossnickle Hines, Michael Alan Jensen, and Vipah Interactive.

=== "The Man with the Yellow Hat" ===
The Man in the Yellow Hat

Aside from George himself, the only recurring character in the original adventures is the Man with the yellow Hat who is George's best friend and caretaker. The Man often facilitates George's adventures by taking him somewhere, and even more often resolves the tension by intervening just in time to get George out of a tight spot. He is always seen wearing a bright yellow suit and a wide brimmed yellow hat. The Man is never mentioned by name in the original adventures or in any subsequent content over more than six decades.

He is always referred to as "The Man" or fully "The Man with the Yellow Hat" (abbreviated "TMWTYH"), but aside from those two names, he is unnamed in the original series and telefilm books. When people speak to George about the Man, they often refer to him as "Your friend". In H. A. Rey's book See the Circus, published in 1946, "The Man with the Yellow Hat" was referred to as "Ted". Later, in Curious George (2006), the Man, who is voiced by Will Ferrell, is also referred to as "Ted" throughout the film; his last name is revealed as being "Shacklefield" in a deleted scene. In the TV series, he is voiced by Jeff Bennett.

== Other media ==
Curious George has been adapted into a television show, films, a magazine, and a video game.

=== Television ===
A set of animated Curious George television films were produced from 1979 to 1982; they were first shown in the United States in 1984 on Nickelodeon. This series was produced and co-written by Alan Shalleck. The shorts were aired on The Disney Channel as a segment on the program Lunch Box starting in 1989. In 1993, Margret Rey successfully sued Lafferty, Harwood, and Partners, the Canadian company that funded the cartoons, for licensing VHS tapes to third-party companies without the Reys' permission. The Reys eventually won the dispute, forcing Lafferty, Harwood, and Partners to pay for all wrongdoing.

=== Film ===
==== Animated DTV films ====
A minimal-animation 16 mm film called Curious George Rides a Bike was produced by Weston Woods Studios in 1958 and later released on DVD.

In 1982, animator John Clark Matthews produced a 16 mm stop-motion animated short called Curious George Goes to the Hospital based on the book of the same name. In 1984, they created another short, again based on the book of the same name. Produced by Churchill Films, the films were created with puppet-figures. Matthews would later use a similar technique for his Frog and Toad films.

==== Documentary films ====
The 2017 film Monkey Business: The Adventures of Curious George's Creators documents the lives of Hans and Margret Rey including their flight from France during the 1940 invasion by Germany, their life in the United States, and their creation of the Curious George children's books.

=== Universal Animation Studios (franchise) ===
==== Feature film ====
An animated film, Curious George, was released on February 10, 2006, featuring Will Ferrell as the voice of the originally unnamed Man with the Yellow Hat. In the film (in which The Man is referred to as "Ted"), Curious George secretly follows The Man onto the ship to the city on his own accord. Frank Welker provided the vocal effects of Curious George. Ron Howard serves as the film's producer.

==== TV series ====
A sequel series to the feature film Curious George debuted on September 4, 2006 on PBS Kids as part of the PBS Kids Preschool Block. Although Curious George ended its original run on April 1, 2015, the series is still airing on PBS Kids in reruns. It was produced by the Boston affiliate WGBH, Imagine Entertainment, and Universal Animation Studios. A revival of the series was released on the streaming service Peacock on July 15, 2020. It then ended March 17, 2022.

==== DTV films ====
A direct-to-video sequel to the film was released on March 2, 2010, titled Curious George 2: Follow That Monkey!, which featured Jeff Bennett replacing Ferrell as the voice of the Man. Bennett also provides the Man's voice in the television series. The second direct-to-video sequel, Curious George 3: Back to the Jungle, was released on June 23, 2015. Curious George: Royal Monkey was released on September 10, 2019, while Curious George: Go West, Go Wild was released on Peacock on September 20, 2020. A sixth and final film, Curious George: Cape Ahoy, was released on Peacock on September 30, 2021. A Christmas film, Curious George: A Very Monkey Christmas, was released in 2009 on PBS. "Curious George Swings Into Spring" and "Curious George: A Halloween Boo Fest" were released in 2013. On Monday, August 6, it began to re-run on Cartoonito.

==== Live-action remake ====
A live action/animated film was in development at Illumination Entertainment in the beginning of the 2010s. In August 2016, Andrew Adamson was in negotiations to direct, co-write, and executive produce a live action film for Universal Pictures, along with Ron Howard, Brian Grazer, David Kirschner, Jon Shapiro and Erica Huggins producing it.

==== Video game ====
A Curious George video game was released on February 2, 2006, published by Namco and developed by Monkey Bar Games, a division of Vicious Cycle Software for Microsoft Windows, Xbox, GameCube, PlayStation 2, and Game Boy Advance. It is the based on the 2006 animated film. A version for the Nintendo DS was also planned, but was cancelled.

==== Stage Show ====
From 2009 to 2011, a musical stage show based on the TV series, Curious George Live!, toured the United States and Canada. In the show, George heads to Rome, Italy to help Chef Pisghetti win a meatball eating contest there. The show was produced by VEE Corporation, the producer of Sesame Street Live!. As of 2025, the show continues to be performed in several community theaters and has been retitled Curious George: The Golden Meatball.

==== Theme park ====
A Curious George-themed water play area, Curious George Goes to Town, opened at Universal Studios Florida in 1998 and was removed in 2023. The attraction was also featured at Universal Studios Hollywood until its removal in 2013.

=== Other ===
A children's bookstore in Harvard Square in Cambridge, Massachusetts was known as Curious George and Friends (formerly Curious George Goes To Wordsworth) and carried a considerable amount of licensed Curious George merchandise. It was the last remaining property of Wordsworth Books, a former local general interest bookstore that closed in the beginning of the 2000s. This store was closed in June 2011. A new store, the World's Only Curious George Store, opened in 2012 at the same address and closed permanently in 2021.

Curious George is used as the theme for children's play areas and some of the children's entertainment on the Stena Line ferries. On some peak time sailings, this includes a Curious George costumed character. Curious George merchandise is also provided with children's meals and is available to purchase in the on-board shop.

In February 2006, the Curious George brand partnered with Welch's jelly for a collection of six jars. In the latter part of that decade (when the new film and the new television show were released), licensing deals for the character generally involved less upscale, more kid-focused products. Earlier, Vivendi Universal (now NBCUniversal) had—for a short time—embraced the use of the character in a series of 2001 adverts for the company, but the character never officially became a corporate mascot.

=== In popular culture ===
In the 1994 film Forrest Gump, one edition of Curious George is featured as Forrest's favorite book, which his mother reads to him. Forrest later reads it with his son, with a Curious George plush also shown on his shelf. In the opening scene, a feather comes floating down to Forrest's feet and he stores it in this book. At the end of the film, it falls out of the book and rises floating through the air again.

Jarrod, the protagonist of the NBC series The Pretender, reads Curious George books in season one and develops a fascination with them. He likens himself to George and Sydney Green to the Man with the Yellow Hat.

The books have inspired other derivative works, including Bangkok Bob (written by Sasha Alyson and published by the Lao publishing project Big Brother Mouse).

== See also ==
- Curious George Brigade, an anarchist collective that used George symbolically
