= H. A. Rey =

Children's illustrator and writer (1898–1977)

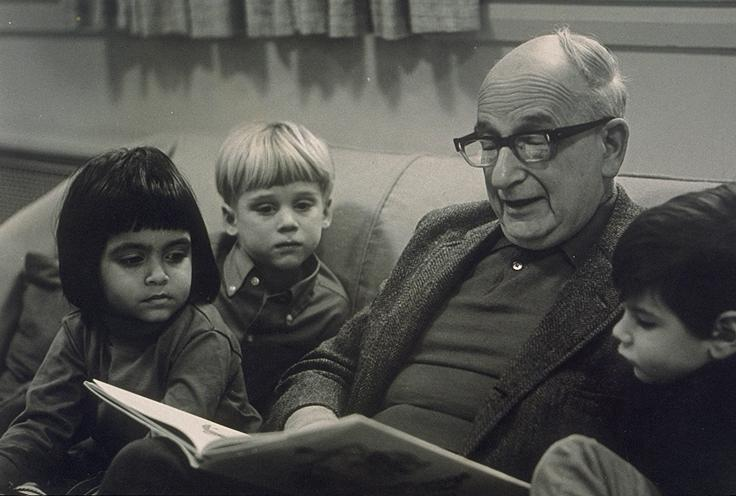
- Rey reading to children in the early 1970s
- Born: Hans Augusto Reyersbach; September 16, 1898; Hamburg, German Empire
- Died: August 26, 1977 (aged 78); Cambridge, Massachusetts, U.S.
- Occupation: Author
- Spouse: Margret Rey (m. 1935)
- Writing career
- Period: 1922–1977
- Genre: Children's literature
- Notable work: Curious George
- Notable awards: Curious George Takes a Job was named to the Lewis Carroll Shelf Award list in 1960.

H. A. Rey (born Hans Augusto Reyersbach; September 16, 1898 – August 26, 1977) was a German-born American illustrator and author, known best for the series of children's picture books that he and his wife Margret Rey created about Curious George.

== Early life ==
Hans Augusto Reyersbach was born in Hamburg, German Empire on September 16, 1898. He and his wife, Margret, were both German Jews. They first met in Hamburg at Margret's sister's 16th birthday party. They met again in Brazil, where Rey was working as a salesman of bathtubs and Margret had gone to escape the rise of Nazism in Germany. They got married in 1935 and moved to Paris, France in August of that year. They lived in Montmartre and fled Paris in June 1940 on bicycles, carrying the Curious George manuscript with them. They received visas in Bayonne under instructions from the Portuguese consul in Bordeaux, Aristides de Sousa Mendes, which enabled them to leave Europe via Portugal.

== Curious George ==
While in Paris, Rey's animal drawings came to the attention of a French publisher, who commissioned him to write a children's book. The characters in Cecily G. and the Nine Monkeys (Raffy and the 9 Monkeys in the United Kingdom) included an impish monkey named Curious George (originally named Fifi). The couple then decided to write a book focused entirely on him. The outbreak of World War II interrupted their work.

Being Jews, the Reys decided to flee Paris before the Nazis invaded the city. Hans assembled two bicycles, and they left the city just a few hours before it fell. Among the meager possessions they brought with them was the illustrated manuscript of Curious George.

The Reys' odyssey took them to Bayonne, France, where they were issued life-saving visas signed by Portuguese Vice-Consul Manuel Vieira Braga (following instructions from Aristides de Sousa Mendes) on June 20, 1940. They crossed the Spanish border, where they bought train tickets to Lisbon. From there, they returned to Brazil, where they had met five years earlier, but this time they continued on to New York. The Reys escaped Europe carrying the manuscript to the first Curious George book, which was published in New York by Houghton Mifflin in 1941. They originally planned to use watercolor illustrations, but since they were responsible for the color separation, Rey changed these to the cartoon-like images that continue to be featured in each of the books. A collector's edition with the original watercolors has since been released.

Curious George was an instant success, and the Reys were commissioned to write more adventures of the mischievous monkey and his friend, the Man with the Yellow Hat. They wrote seven stories in all, with Hans mainly doing the illustrations and Margret working mostly on the stories, though they both admitted to sharing the work and cooperating fully in every stage of development. At first, however, covers omitted Margret's name. In later editions, this was changed, and Margret now receives full credit for her role in developing the stories.

Curious George Takes a Job was named to the Lewis Carroll Shelf Award list in 1960.

In 1963, the Reys relocated to Cambridge, Massachusetts, in a house near Harvard Square, and lived there until Rey died on August 26, 1977.

In the 1990s, friends of the Reys founded a children's bookstore named Curious George & Friends (formerly Curious George Goes to Wordsworth), which operated in Harvard Square until 2011. A new Curious George themed store opened in 2012, The World's Only Curious George Store, which moved to Central Square in 2019.

In September 1997, Universal Studios' Consumer Products Group acquired licensing rights to Curious George from publisher Houghton Mifflin. Universal subsequently produced screen adaptations of the property, including the 2006 animated feature film and the television series produced by Universal 1440 Entertainment. The television series was avalible to stream on Peacock until October 1, 2026. Curious George officially left PBS Kids on September 30, 2026, after a 20-year broadcast run, because NBCUniversal's broadcast rights to the series expired

== Star charts ==
Rey's interest in astronomy began during World War I and led to his desire to redraw constellation diagrams, which Rey found difficult to remember, so that they were more intuitive. This led to the 1952 publication of The Stars: A New Way to See Them (ISBN 0-395-24830-2). His constellation diagrams were adopted widely and now appear in many astronomy guides, such as Donald H. Menzel's A Field Guide to the Stars and Planets. As of 2008 The Stars: A New Way to See Them and a simplified presentation for children called Find the Constellations are still in print. A new edition of Find the Constellations was released in 2008, updated with modern fonts, the new status of Pluto, and some more current measurements of planetary sizes and orbital radii.

Traditional diagram of the constellation Gemini.

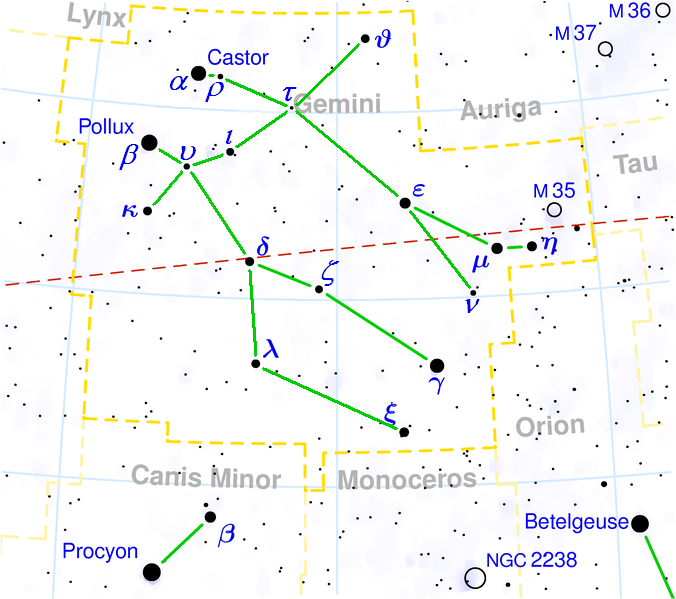
Rey's alternative diagram of Gemini: twins are shown holding hands.

Traditional diagram of the constellation Leo.

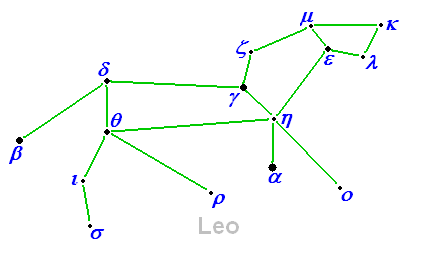
Rey's alternative diagram of Leo: A lion walking.

Traditional diagram of the constellation Virgo.

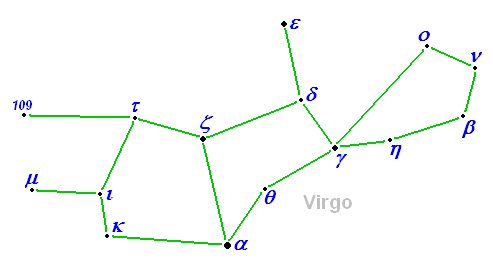
Rey's alternative diagram of Virgo: A reclining woman.

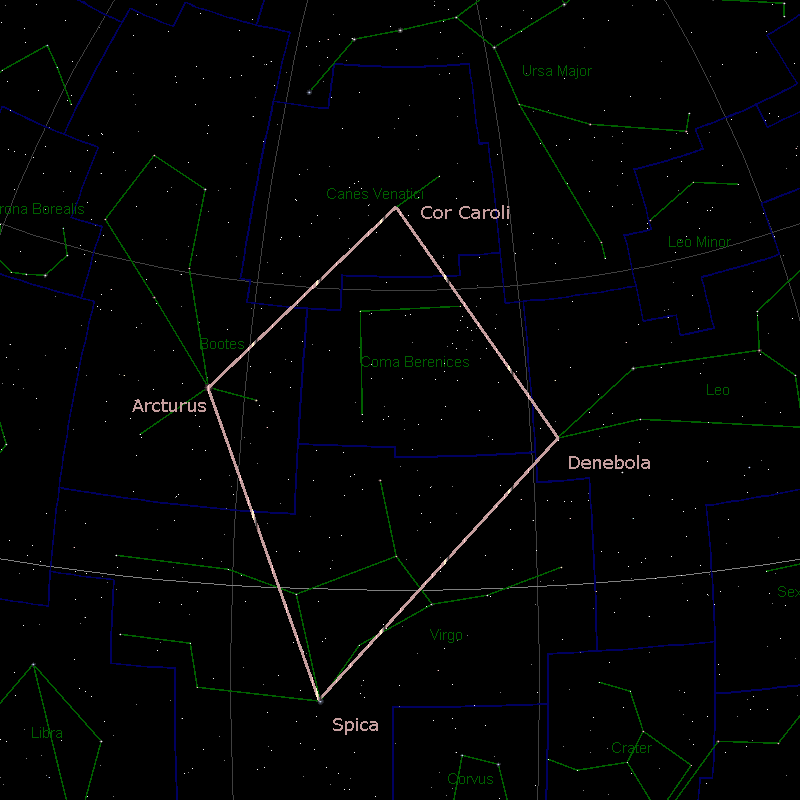
Rey's Virgin's Diamond asterism

== Collected papers ==
The University of Oregon holds H. A. Rey papers dated 1940 to 1961, consisting mainly of correspondence between Rey and his American and British publishers.

The de Grummond Children's Literature Collection in Hattiesburg, Mississippi, holds more than 300 boxes of Rey papers dated 1973 to 2002.

Dr. Lena Y. de Grummond, a professor of library science at the University of Southern Mississippi, contacted the Reys in 1966 about USM's new children's literature collection. H. A. and Margret donated a pair of sketches at the time. When Margret Rey died in 1996, her will designated that the entire literary estate of the Reys be donated to the de Grummond Collection.

== Books written by H. A. Rey ==
- Cecily G. and the Nine Monkeys (Raffy and the 9 Monkeys)
- Curious George
- Curious George Takes a Job
- Curious George Rides a Bike
- Curious George Gets a Medal
- Curious George Learns the Alphabet
- Curious George Goes to the Hospital
- Feed the Animals
- Find the Constellations
- Elizabite - Adventures of a Carnivorous Plant
- How Do You Get There?
- Pretzel
- The Stars: A New Way to See Them
- Where's My Baby?
- See the Circus
- Tit for Tat
- Billy's Picture
- Whiteblack the Penguin Sees the World
- Au Clair de la Lune and other French Nursery Songs (1941)
- Spotty (1945)
- Mary had a Little Lamb and other Nursery Songs (1951)
- Humpty Dumpty and other Mother Goose Songs (©1943 Harper & Brothers)

== Books illustrated by H. A. Rey ==
=== As Hans Reyersbach ===
- Dem Andenken Christian Morgensterns: 12 Lithographien zu seinen Werken (ca. 1922)
- Die Sommerfrische: 10 Idyllen in Linol-Schnitt. Berlin (1923)
- 12 Lithographien zu Christian Morgensterns Grotesken. Hamburg: Kurt Enoch Verlag (1923)
- 12 Lithographien zu Christian Morgensterns Grotesken: Neue Folge. Hamburg: Kurt Enoch Verlag (1925)

=== As H. A. Rey ===
- Curious George, written by Margret Rey (1941)
- Elizabite - The Adventures of a Carnivorous Plant (1942)
- Don't Frighten the Lion, written by Margaret Wise Brown (1942)
- Katy No-Pocket, written by Emmy Payne (1944)
- Pretzel, written by Margret Rey (1944)
- We Three Kings and other Christmas Carols (1944)
- Curious George Takes a Job, written by Margret Rey (1947)
- Curious George Rides a Bike, written by Margret Rey (1952)
- Curious George Gets a Medal. written by Margret Rey (1957)
- Curious George Flies a Kite, written by Margret Rey (1958)
- Curious George Learns the Alphabet, written by Margret Rey (1963)
- Curious George Goes to the Hospital, written by Margret Rey (1966)

=== Wordless Novels ===
- Zebrology. Chatto and Windus; London, England; (1937)
- How the Flying Fishes Came into Being. Chatto and Windus; London, England; (1938)
