= Margret Rey =

Children's illustrator and writer (1906–1996)

- Margret Rey with her husband, H. A. Rey in 1951
- Born: Margarete Elisabeth Waldstein; May 16, 1906; Hamburg, German Empire
- Died: December 21, 1996 (aged 90); Cambridge, Massachusetts, U.S.
- Education: Bauhaus
- Occupations: Writer, illustrator
- Spouse: H. A. Rey (m. 1935; died 1977)
- Writing career
- Years active: 1939-1966
- Genre: Children's literature
- Notable work: Curious George

Margret Elizabeth Rey (born Margarete Elisabeth Waldstein; May 16, 1906 – December 21, 1996) was a German-born American writer and illustrator, best known for the Curious George series of children's picture books that she and her husband H. A. Rey created from 1939 to 1966.

== Life ==
Margarete Elisabeth Waldstein was born on May 16, 1906, in Hamburg, German Empire, the daughter of Gertrude (Rosenfeld) and Felix Waldstein. Her father was a member of the Reichstag. She studied art at Bauhaus in Dessau, Kunstakademie Düsseldorf, and the Ludwig-Maximilians-Universität München between 1926 and 1928 and afterward worked in advertising. In 1935, she left Germany for Rio de Janeiro, in Brazil to escape Nazism (Nazi Germany) – and to meet Hans Reyersbach, a salesman and another German Jew from Hamburg, who had been a family friend. They married in 1935 and moved to Paris, France, in 1936.

While in Paris, Hans's animal drawings came to the attention of a French publisher, who commissioned him to write a children's book. The result, Cecily G. and the Nine Monkeys, is little remembered today, but one of its characters, an adorably impish monkey named Curious George, was such a success that the couple considered writing a book just about him. Their work was interrupted with the outbreak of World War II. The Nazis later invaded France. As Jews, the Reys decided to flee from Paris before the Nazis seized the city. Hans built two bicycles, and they fled Paris just a few hours before it fell. Among the meager possessions they brought with them was the illustrated manuscript of Curious George.

The Reys' odyssey took them to Bayonne, France, where they were issued life-saving visas signed by Portuguese Vice-Consul Manuel Vieira Braga (following instructions from Aristides de Sousa Mendes) on June 20, 1940. They crossed into Spain, where they bought train tickets to Lisbon, Portugal. From there they returned to Brazil, where they had met five years earlier, but this time they continued to New York City in the United States. The books were published by Houghton Mifflin in 1941, though certain changes had to be introduced because of the technology of the time. Hans and Margret originally planned to use watercolors to illustrate the books, but since they were responsible for the color separation, he changed these to the cartoon-like images that continue to feature in each of the books. A collector's edition with the original watercolors was released in 1998.

Curious George was an instant success, and the Reys were commissioned to write more adventures of the mischievous monkey and his friend, the Man with the Yellow Hat. They wrote seven stories in all, with Hans mainly doing the illustrations and Margret working mostly on the stories, though they both admitted to sharing the work and cooperating fully in every stage of development. At first, however, Margret's name was left off the cover, ostensibly because there was a glut of women already writing children's fiction. In later editions, this was corrected, and Margret now receives full credit for her role in developing the stories.

Margret and her husband moved to Cambridge, Massachusetts, in 1963, in a house close to Harvard Square. Following her husband's death in 1977, Margret continued writing, and in 1979 she became a professor of Creative Writing at Brandeis University in Waltham, Massachusetts. From 1980 she collaborated with Alan Shalleck on a series of short films featuring Curious George and on more than two dozen additional books.

In 1989 Margret Rey established the Curious George Foundation to help creative children and prevent cruelty to animals. In 1996, she made major donations to the Boston Public Library and Beth Israel Deaconess Medical Center. She was also a long-time supporter of the Longy School of Music.

Rey died of a heart attack on December 21, 1996, in Cambridge, Massachusetts at the age of 90.

== Collected papers ==
The de Grummond Children's Literature Collection in Hattiesburg, Mississippi, holds more than 300 boxes of Rey papers dated 1973 to 2002.

Dr. Lena Y. de Grummond, a professor of library science at the University of Southern Mississippi, contacted the Reys in 1966 about USM's new children's literature collection. H. A. and Margret donated a pair of sketches at the time. When Margret Rey died in 1996, her will designated that the entire literary estate of the Reys would be donated to the de Grummond Collection.
