= Darkest Night (film) =

- Directed by: Noel Tan
- Written by: Russ Williams
- Produced by: Russ Williams; Noel Tan; DJ Perry
- Starring: DJ Perry; Anne Gauthier; Issa Litton; Nic Campos
- Cinematography: Brian Sales
- Edited by: Sean Louis Bata
- Music by: Sonny Dave Flores Taclibon
- Production companies: Gothic Pictures International; Collective Development, Inc.
- Distributed by: Maxim Media International (U.S. and Canada)
- Release date: October 20, 2012 (FACINE International Film Festival)
- Running time: 99 minutes
- Country: Philippines
- Language: English
- Budget: $125,000

Darkest Night is a 2012 independent film in the horror film genre, directed by Filipino Noel Tan and written and produced by American Russ Williams. It stars DJ Perry, Anne Gauthier, Issa Litton, and Nic Campos. Its story is set in the mountains of Luzon in the Philippines. A large family gathers for a happy reunion and marriage announcement on Christmas Day at an isolated mansion, only to encounter a series of bizarre, demonic, and tragic events.

The film started shooting on May 2, 2011, and had its U.S. premiere at the Filipino Arts and Cinema (FACINE) International Film Festival in San Francisco on October 20, 2012. At this festival, the film won a special award for Valuable Contribution. Darkest Night received a limited U.S. theatrical release on July 1, 2013, and full video release on July 16. Largely good reviews greeted the film from critics, its festival audience and general audiences alike. The film seeks to build bridges between Asian and American cultures, producing horror with a blend of both.

== Plot ==
The story in Darkest Night unfolds as a found footage "documentary" by a Filipino television journalist, Danny Valencia (Jonas Gruet). In what are purportedly his words, Danny writes that he created the film from videotape found at the site of a 2003 unsolved crime. The opening scene shows him and some workmen at the crime site, ruins of a mansion where a family disappeared.

Then, the video begins. On December 25, 2003, Michelle Espino (Issa Litton) and her husband, David (Allan Dale Alojipan), host their upscale family's Christmas Day reunion at their mansion in the mountains. Susan (Anne Gauthier) and American Ken Tyler (DJ Perry) are engaged after dating for months in Manila. They travel to the Espinos' home with Susan's live-in sister, Chelsea (Jill Palencia). When they arrive, Susan announces the engagement to the entire family and introduces Ken. An autistic cousin, Justin, a video camera savant, takes over videotaping from then on. (See Autism and Savant syndrome.)

After dinner, a mild earthquake jolts everyone, and the power goes out, plunging all into darkness. Everyone realizes that all batteries and electricity are useless except for Justin's video camera. A dense fog surrounds the mansion and the entire area. David goes out, walking toward a neighbor's house to seek information. Later, the television switches on by itself without power, showing a strange pagan ritual congregation with weird singing. Now more frightened, the family members try to guard each other. After several other family members die or disappear, Susan finds an old book bearing the French title “The Way of Baphomet" and the motto Ensemble Toujours (Together Always). Soon, only Michelle, Steven, Susan and Ken are left. They realize the time is 9 am, and it's still dark outside. Susan discovers the French words Ensemble Toujours written on a wall. An upset Michelle rushes outside, finding a prowler. She shoots him, only to find David's grotesquely deformed body. Michelle then shoots herself dead.

Later, Susan, Ken and Steven gather in the kitchen. She shows them the old "[Baphomet]" book and demands an explanation from Steven. He tells them Michelle was into black magic, and the book was her "Bible." She was able to learn powerful magic spells from it. Many years ago, a cult from France worshiped the demon god Baphomet and practiced black magic on this very land. They all mysteriously disappeared on Christmas Day 1914. Steven confesses he and Michelle also had an affair. Michelle later told him she had found an easy way to ascend magically into "heaven" along with the whole family. Earlier, she had cast a spell on everyone there. However, these rites actually required human sacrifice, mutilation and torture. When Michelle realized her "god" had deceived her, she killed herself. Susan reads from the book that, in the final rite, a man and woman must wed, and then the bride has to castrate her groom.

Trying to break the magic spell, Susan leads them all in a seance, calling on Michael and requesting release. Michael appears and goes to Steven. Both disappear. Finally, Susan finds that Ken is dead too, and only she is left. She places her engagement ring on his finger with a ring she gave him. Then he vanishes like all the others. The television flickers on again. They see the pagan cult robed in white, gathering outdoors around an altar. Before all, Ken and Michelle make love. She proceeds to castrate him as a human sacrifice. The set then shows a picture of the entire family, robed and near the altar, without Susan and Justin. The scene slowly dissolves. A robed Susan and Justin now stand with the rest of the family.

In the final scene the journalist, Danny, is still among the original ruins with the work crew, as at first. Everyone gathers by a box they had found, and inside is the old French book, “The Way of Baphomet." On top of the book are the two rings together, Susan's and Ken's.

== Cast ==
DJ Perry is an American actor. Justin Hoong-Fai Chan is Chinese Malaysian. All the other actors are Filipino:

- DJ Perry as Ken Tyler
- Anne Gauthier as Susan Reyes
- Issa Litton as Michelle Espino
- Nic Campos as Steven Espino
- Jill Palencia as Chelsea Reyes
- Justin Hoong-Fai Chan as Jeffrey Espino
- Zeny Sevilla as Reina Espino
- Kevin Vitug as Ricky Santos
- Elle Velasco as Carol Santos
- Marife Necesito as Agira Espino
- Jonas Gruet as Danny Valencia
- Allan Dale Alojipan as David Espino
- Raymond Osmeña as Alan Espino
- James Lomahan as Garry Santos
- Czarina Llane Kwong as Annie Espino
- Clark Gamul as Jason Espino
- Shierdan Pamintuan as Andy Cuevas
- Alexandra Marie Tan as Young Susan
- Crisanto Garrido as the Paramedic
- Christian Tan as Justin Espino
- Chris Joshua Tan as Michael Espino
- Giann Paula Martizano as Young Chelsea
- Stefano Rota as Andre Devereaux
- Trixie Dauz as Corrine Devereaux

== Background and Development ==
The screenwriter and producer of Darkest Night, Russ Williams (originally from Tennessee) had lived in Los Angeles, California, for more than 20 years before moving to Southeast Asia in 2010. His first film, set and shot in the United States in 2002, was titled The Last Year. Williams wrote and also produced this film (his co-producer title was uncredited, according to him). A long-time fan of horror film, Williams wanted his next production to be in that genre. Also a lover of Asian horror films, he came up with the idea of combining traditional American horror film tropes and concepts with the classic Asian ghost story as represented in Japanese horror films like The Ring (Ringu 1998, see Ring (film)), Pulse (Kairo, see Pulse (2001 film)) and Ju-on: The Grudge (Ju-on 2002). Williams reportedly had more reasons than just a lower budget for making Darkest Night as a found-footage film. According to what he wrote himself, he wanted the film to be a cinéma vérité recording of the way reality looks during a nightmare, specifically his own nightmares as a child. "These nightmares never had great production values or looked beautiful. They were always dark, fragmentary, claustrophobic and chaotic. I never had control over what my 'mental camera' actually saw. While dreaming, I felt like I was autistic in almost every sense of the word, unable to control myself while in that terrible world. In fact," he added, "My nightmares never look like a 15 million-dollar production."

Nightmares portray some of our most deeply held fears, especially about family, according to the famous American horror observer, Joseph Maddrey. For example, he explains the huge appeal of the Nightmare on Elm Street franchise (1984 original directed by Wes Craven) as a result of its exploiting these fears. In Darkest Night Williams and the director, Noel Tan, draw a direct line from ultra-realistic cinéma vérité style into terrifying childhood-type nightmares, disjointed time, claustrophobia, bad family relationships and twisted ghosts from the past. The result is a formula for heart-sick, demoralizing fear. During the film, although supernatural dangers abound, the viewer slowly realizes that the film's story is about a desperate, truly dysfunctional family. Loved ones sought to rely on in a crisis instead lash out, buckle or commit outright betrayal. After the earthquake, and the lights go out, the film crosses over from ordinary life, into increasingly dread-filled dark scenarios.

=== Based on Malaysian 'Urban Legend' ===
After moving to Kuala Lumpur, Malaysia, in May 2010, Williams sought to produce a film there based on an older Horror film screenplay he had previously written, titled Out of Time. This script was about an isolated family that fell prey to black magic induced by a family member. After coming across a Malaysian urban legend type ghost story, he decided to combine the subject matter of the script with this story. The local legend tells the story of a Chinese family that mysteriously disappeared in the Malaysian Cameron Highlands on February 1, 2003, during the night of a Chinese New Year celebration. Williams investigated this story and interviewed, either by himself or through assistants, more persons in Malaysia to gather as much information as he could about this seemingly government-suppressed ghost story.

As Williams learned more about this legend, he discovered many similarities between the plot of Out of Time and the reported stories of the "disappeared" family. In personal interviews with the press, Williams does not assert that Darkest Night is based on a true story. However, he has said he believes the Malaysian story is a valid account. Also he makes no claims about the authenticity of local tales of ghosts that supposedly inhabit the actual ruins and locale where the Malaysian family disappeared. When asked, Williams refuses to give the name of the family in this urban legend, citing privacy concerns for family members still living in parts of the country. As a part of his interests in pagan religion and Gothic fiction, Williams had long been studying the Middle Ages-originated Baphomet mythology and related pagan mythologies. He did extensive research into the various historic Baphomet and similar cults to provide additional background for the story of Darkest Night. The religious, magical and ritualistic elements of the plot were taken from various beliefs of these cults, especially the Druid elements, as well as the occult-influenced black magic writings of Aleister Crowley. According to Williams, historical Baphomet-related ideas and images are a vital part of the film's story and visuals.

=== Move to Philippines ===
The film-making climate of Malaysia proved unsuitable to filming there because of arbitrary government film censorship, so Williams decided to film Darkest Night on locations in the Philippines. This action, of course, required some location-related rewriting of the script. The Chinese characters in the story became Filipino, and the Chinese New Year became Christmas. The characters and general family dynamic in the story remained the same, and the author only made changes necessary to accommodate a different culture, race and nationality. As a result, the final version of the Darkest Night screenplay came about.

== Production, Premieres and Release ==
Darkest Night is the first film from Gothic Pictures International (credited in the film as Gothic Productions International, the company's previous name; see "External Links" below), an independent film company now based in Los Angeles. Founded in Southeast Asia in November 2010, the company says officially that its purpose is bringing film-makers together from across the globe to create quality Gothic, horror and similar "dark" films. A small group of American and Filipino film-makers met in Manila during late 2010 for the purpose of founding this company and producing Darkest Night. Russ Williams and Noel Tan, the film's director who is a native of the Philippines, were the co-founders of the company and went on to supervise the making of the film. Darkest Night was produced in cooperation with the Michigan company, Collective Development, Inc. (see "External Links" below).

=== Production and Reported Apparitions ===
Tan and Williams worked together closely on this production from January to May 2011. Pre-production began in January, and they were able to put together a cast and crew to shoot the film by late April 2011. Shooting for the film began on May 2 and lasted 10 days, mostly in and around a rural mansion in Floridablanca, Pampanga in Luzon, where the entire production group lived together during that time. There were many reports of supernatural events happening in the house during the shooting of Darkest Night, including local stories that the house was actually haunted. For example, while working on the film the film's star, DJ Perry, showed others deep scratches on his back, saying they were from an unseen entity. These scratches were documented by photographs purported to be real. Other cast and crew members claimed that they saw ghostly presences while the house was darkened and quiet during the ten-day film shoot.

=== Post-Production ===
Post-production for Darkest Night lasted about one year, from June 2011 to June 2012 and took place in Manila. Work on this phase of production was delayed and severely hampered by strange events during this entire time. For example, all of the film's later dialog dubbing (ADR recordings, see dubbing (filmmaking)) mysteriously disappeared at one point and were never found. Also, much of the visual effects (VFX) footage and original sound effects recording, as well as footage of several chroma key screen shoots, all simply vanished. These types of disappearances plagued the film's Post-production almost continually. Currently, only the rough cut sequence choices from the Darkest Night original video take footage plus a few brief visual effects sequences and outtake footage remain accounted for. All other additional footage from the film, digital audio and video, is lost. No one has been able to account for these strange losses associated with the film. The final budget for Darkest Night was reportedly estimated at US$125,000. At this time, there are no figures for the film's gross receipts.

=== Film Premieres ===
On November 16, 2011, there was a private premiere of Darkest Night in Manila for cast and crew plus their friends and relatives. Again mysterious losses plagued the film, and the director was forced to show an inferior rough cut of the film because no finished video could be found. The release dates for the film were seriously delayed while another post-production phase during 2012 was required before the producers had a fully finished version of the film. Finally, Darkest Night had its U.S. premiere at the FACINE International Film Festival in San Francisco on October 20, 2012. The festival's director, Dr. Mauro Tumbocon, reported that the original DVD for the film, which he had first received, would not work. Instead he had to preview the film for the festival from an "emergency copy" at the very last minute, before the film could be "officially" scheduled.

=== Initial Release ===
At the FACINE Film Festival, Williams announced that Maxim Media International (Scottsboro, Arizona; see "External Links" below) would release Darkest Night in the United States during mid 2013. This company specializes in releasing quality horror film. Later on, a definite North American release schedule was confirmed for July of that year. The film did achieve North American theatrical and video release during that time. The film was accompanied by a "behind the scenes" documentary titled "The Demons Behind Darkest Night."

== Response ==
The media response in Manila during the shooting and local premiere was generally favorable. "Philippine Entertainment Portal" (PEP), the Manila Internet equivalent of America's People Magazine wrote that "Darkest Night combines western demons with eastern spiritual traditions to come up with an original recipe for suspense and terror." Yes! magazine, one of the most popular entertainment magazines in the Philippines, wrote that the film tells a fascinating story interwoven with the culture of Southeast Asia. Mell Navarro and Ronald Rafer, both nationally recognized film critics in the Philippines, gave the film favorable reviews. The response at the 2012 FACINE Film Festival was extremely positive with critical praise from Dr. Tumbocon, who said Darkest Night is "an awesome experience. This film is a milestone in building bridges between Asian and American cultures." Additionally, other festival attendees praised Darkest Night as "extremely entertaining" and "a hell of a good film." Asian critics were generally favorable; for example, Jason Wong said that Darkest Night is "an excellent, provocative 'found video' horror film." Wong also brought up that he was glad this story was getting notice in the United States because he believed that the Malaysian government had been "officially" suppressing it. Another member of the Asian audience said the film is "extremely scary and disturbing." American film critic, Mark Bullock, of the online magazine Hacked in the Head, stated, "I really enjoyed ... Darkest Night. It had plenty of genuinely creepy moments to keep you interested and a thoroughly interesting plot which keeps you guessing." There was only one really negative review published, from the American critic, Martin Leggett, at "Best-Horror-Movies.com," who did not like the film's handling of its found-footage aspects. He said, "I believe reference is made to the fact that Justin doesn’t talk much and they weren’t kidding! Justin witnesses people vanishing before his eyes, he quietly watches characters get killed and there’s never a peep out of him to any other character he sees. Is Justin possessed?" However, Andrea Kendall, of Portland, Oregon, said, "I was pleasantly surprised by this movie. I especially appreciated the acting, use of music and that a lot of the elements where [sic.] off screen and thus left to the imagination."
