= Constellation Prize =

Constellation Prize may refer to:

- Constellation Prize (album), 2013 album by Carbon Leaf
- "Constellation Prize" (song), 2016 song by Swedish singer Robin Bengtsson
