= Echo Echo =

Studio album by Carbon Leaf
- Released: March 2001
- Genre: adult album alternative
- Length: 71:01
- Label: Constant Ivy Records
- Producer: John Morand

Carbon Leaf chronology
Ether~Electrified Porch Music (1999)	Echo Echo (2001)	5 Alive! (2003)

Professional ratings
Review scores
Source	Rating
Allmusic	4/5 stars

Echo Echo is Carbon Leaf's fourth album. It was released in 2001 by the band's own label, Constant Ivy Records.

== Track listing ==
1. "The Boxer" - 3:26
2. "Wandrin' Around" - 4:00
3. "On Any Given Day" - 5:04
4. "Torn to Tattered" - 5:29
5. "Mellow Tone" - 4:18
6. "Shine" - 3:36 (author Lydia Netzer cited this song as the inspiration for the title of her 2012 book Shine Shine Shine)
7. "Mary Mac" - 2:57
8. "I Know the Reason" - 4:27
9. "Lonesome Pine" - 4:02
10. "Follow the Lady" - 5:33
11. "Desperation Song" - 5:26
12. "Toy Soldiers" - 4:37
13. "Maybe Today" - 10:29
14. "Dear" - 7:37 (Bonus Track)

== Release ==
"The Boxer" went on to bring Carbon Leaf local, regional, and even some national recognition. In January 2002 Carbon Leaf won the first-ever American Music Awards Presents the Coca-Cola New Music Award for "The Boxer." As part of winning they performed "The Boxer" live on the AMAs to 80 million television viewers worldwide. Following this appearance, "The Boxer" entered regular rotation on radio stations including Washington, DC's DC101 (WWDC 101.1 FM).
