= Catalina Film Festival =

- Opening film: May 29, 1929
- Location: Santa Catalina Island, Avalon, California
- Founded by: Ron Truppa

The Catalina Film Festival is an annual event that takes place at the end of September on Catalina Island, situated in Los Angeles County within the city of Avalon, California.

Founded by Festival Director Ron Truppa, Catalina is known as "Hollywood's Island", as it is the only west coast resort island in the United States, situated in Los Angeles County. Below a 6,200-person ballroom in the Avalon Casino, one of the main venues for the festival, the 1,154-seat Avalon Theater started construction in February 1928 to become the first sound theater ever built in the world by William Wrigley Jr. After its opening on May 29, 1929, Hollywood pioneers like Charlie Chaplin, Cecil B. DeMille, and D. W. Griffith would come to Catalina to screen their first "Talkie films." Marilyn Monroe lived in Catalina with her first husband during its World War II occupation. The Chicago Cubs, owned by William Wrigley Jr., who also owned the controlling interest in the Santa Catalina Island Company, held the Chicago Cubs spring training on the island for 30 years. In 1936, Ronald Reagan was discovered in Hollywood because he was in Catalina, covering the spring training. Because of that history, the Ronald Reagan Presidential Foundation honors his Hollywood legacy with an annual "Great Communicator" award at the festival, along with other industry tributes given by the festival with the cooperation of the families of Charles Spencer Chaplin, with the Charlie Chaplin ICON Award, Stanley Kramer, with the Stanley Kramer Social Artist Award, along with other industry trophies established by the festival. Many names in the entertainment business vacationed, filmed, or lived on Catalina over the past 100 years, like Mack Sennett, Cary Grant, John Barrymore, Errol Flynn, Jayne Mansfield, Mickey Rooney, Natalie Wood, Robert Wagner, John Wayne, so many more.

This non-profit organization and international film festival focuses on independent film but also helps support the host island through its philanthropic efforts and beneficiary, the Catalina Island Conservancy. As protectors of 88% of the island's natural habitat, the Conservancy is not only credited with the quickest recovery of any endangered species in the world, the Catalina Island fox, but it also takes care of all the plants, marine life and wildlife on and around the island. The Conservancy gives out its honor at the film festival, the ISLA Earth Award, focused on drawing attention to filmmakers and films that educate or project a message of conservation.

== Past Industry Award Winners ==
2020

- Martin Kove, Catalina Film’s Career Tribute Award

2019

- Mira Sorvino, Avalon Award

2018

- Richard Dryfuss, Stanley Kramer Social Artist Award

2016

- Jamie King, Avalon Award

2015

- Kristin Davis, Conservation Activist Award
- F. Gary Gray, Stanley Kramer Social Artist Award
- Mena Suvari, Avalon Award
- Nicola Pedrozzi, Best Screenplay Award

2014

- Nicolas Cage, Charlie Chaplin ICON Award for Joe
- Andy Garcia, Ronald Reagan Great Communicator Award
- William H. Macy, Stanley Kramer Social Artist Award
- Emmy Rossum, Avalon Award

2013

- Patricia Arquette, Career Tribute Award
- Kate Bosworth, Avalon Award
- Jon Favreau, Charlie Chaplin ICON Award
- Bailee Madison, Catalina Crest Award
- Tony Scott, Majestic Award
- Sharon Stone, Stanley Kramer Social Artist Award

2012

- Stan Lee, Ronald Reagan Great Communicator Award
- Mark Rydell, Career Tribute Award
- With Great Power: The Stan Lee Story (Filmmakers), Majestic Award

2011

- Ed Begley Jr., ISLA Earth Conservancy Award
- Atlas Shrugged, Ronald Reagan Great Communicator Award

=== Past Filmmaker Awards ===
2018

- Love Possibly (dir. Michael Boccalini & Che Grant), Best International Feature

2015

- Loveband (written by Nicola Pedrozzi), Best Screenplay Award

2013

- Yellow (dir. Nick Cassavetes), Best Feature

2012

- Irvine Welsh's Ecstasy (dir. Rob Heydon), Best Feature

2011

- Small Town Murder Songs, Best Feature
- Denmark, Official Short Film Selection
- Words Unspoken (dir. Renee O'Connor), Official Short Film Selection and Finalist
- Samuel Bleak, (dir. Dustin Schuetter), Official Feature Film Selection and Finalist
