= D. giganteum =

D. giganteum may refer to:

- Deinotherium giganteum, an extinct mammal species
- Dissanthelium giganteum, a grass species in the genus Dissanthelium

== See also ==
- Giganteum
