= Kevin Hershberger =

American film/television director and producer

Kevin Richard Hershberger
- Born: September 7, 1973 (age 52); Indianapolis, Indiana,

Kevin Richard Hershberger (born September 7, 1973) is an American film director, film producer, and screenwriter. Hershberger. was born in Indianapolis, Indiana and grew up in Maryland. He attended the Virginia Military Institute (1995) and majored in International Studies and History. He then served as a Military Intelligence Officer in the United States Army for eight years. He currently lives in Richmond, Virginia. Hershberger is president of LionHeart FilmWorks and is best known for his first feature film, Wicked Spring (2001) which he wrote, directed and produced.

== Notable works ==
For television, Hershberger has directed several broadcast series including Legends & Lies, and Deadly Shootouts. (REELZ Channel); Killer Kids; Triggers: Weapons That Changed the World and America: Facts Vs Fiction. In December 2014 Hershberger directed the Discovery Networks mini-series The American Revolution for which Kevin was nominated for "Outstanding Lighting Direction & Scenic Design". at the 36th Annual News & Documentary Emmy Awards. Also in 2014 Kevin was Co-Producer, Costume Designer and Historical Advisor for the Civil War feature film Field of Lost Shoes starring Tom Skerritt, Jason Isaacs and Lauren Holly He worked again as Producer, Costume Designer and Historical Advisor for the theatrical feature Josephine from writer and director Rory Feek. Hershberger has continued to direct and produce museum films as well as multi-part documentary series for world-wide TV and home entertainment release through Mill Creek Entertainment such as: Up From Slavery; Emancipation Road; Carbon Leaf, Monsters Among Us; Gangster Empire: Rise of the Mob; The Ultimate Civil War Series.; NASA: A Journey Through Space.; and Vietnam: 50 Years Remembered.

== Crew work ==
=== Films ===
- Josephine
- Field of Lost Shoes
- Let It Begin Here
- Wicked Spring

=== Television ===
- Siege of Yorktown
- Up from Slavery
- Friedrich Wilhelm von Steuben
- Legends & Lies: The Real West
- Legends & Lies: The Civil War
- Legends & Lies: The Patriots
- Deadly Shootouts
- America: Facts Vs. Fiction
- The American Revolution
- Killer Kids
- Church Secrets & Legends
- Triggers: Weapons That Changed the World
- For Love of Liberty
