= Shadows in the Banquet Hall =

Studio album by Carbon Leaf
- Released: October 1, 1997
- Genre: adult album alternative
- Length: 52:29
- Label: Constant Ivy Music
- Producer: Carbon Leaf

Carbon Leaf chronology
Meander (1995)	Shadows in the Banquet Hall (1997)	Ether~Electrified Porch Music (1999)

Professional ratings
Review scores
Source	Rating
Allmusic	2.5/5 stars

Shadows in the Banquet Hall is Carbon Leaf's second album. It was released in 1997 by the band's own label, Constant Ivy Records.

== Track listing ==
1. "Wolftrap and Fireflies" – 4:12
2. "Attica's Flower Box Window" – 4:40
3. "Come Again?" – 3:42
4. "Flood" – 5:21
5. "Reunion Monticello" – 3:53
6. "November (Makebelieve)" – 5:38
7. "Summer Song" – 4:05
8. "Blind Session Eye" – 6:07
9. "Message to Me" – 4:04
10. "For the Girl" – 7:45
11. "Dusk" – 3:02

== Release ==
A video was made for "Flood" that won first place for an Unsigned Music Video in the Internet Underground Music Archive.
