= Curious George 2: Follow That Monkey! =

- DVD cover
- Directed by: Norton Virgien
- Screenplay by: Chuck Tately
- Story by: Chuck Tately; Darrell Rooney
- Based on: Characters by Margret Rey; H.A. Rey; Alan J. Shalleck
- Produced by: Share Stallings
- Starring: Tim Curry; Clint Howard; Jamie Kennedy; Matt Lauer; Jerry Lewis; Frank Welker; Jeff Bennett
- Edited by: John Bryant
- Music by: Heitor Pereira (score); Carbon Leaf (songs)
- Production companies: Universal Animation Studios; Imagine Entertainment
- Distributed by: Universal Pictures
- Release dates: July 10, 2009 (Denmark, Sweden, and Iceland); March 2, 2010 (United States); October 4, 2010 (United Kingdom)
- Running time: 81 minutes
- Country: United States
- Language: English
- Box office: $2.2 million

Curious George 2: Follow That Monkey! is a 2009 American animated direct-to-video adventure comedy film directed by Norton Virgien. The film is based on the Curious George children's stories by H.A. Rey and Margret Rey. A sequel to the 2006 film Curious George, it was originally subtitled Monkey on the Run. It was released straight to DVD in the United States and theatrically in Denmark, Sweden, and Iceland.

While Frank Welker and Ed O'Ross reprise their roles from the first film as George and Ivan respectively, several other roles were recast. Will Ferrell, the voice of Ted (The Man with the Yellow Hat), was replaced by Jeff Bennett, reprising his role from the television series; Drew Barrymore, the voice of Maggie, was replaced by Nickie Bryar; Dick Van Dyke, the voice of Mr. Bloomsberry, was replaced by Fred Tatasciore. Clint Howard who previously voiced Balloon Man in the first film, voices Farmer Dan. Tim Curry, Jamie Kennedy, Matt Lauer, and Jerry Lewis voice the new characters. Ron Howard, who is the producer of the 2006 film, returns as executive producer, along with his partner Brian Grazer.

== Plot ==
George, now living with Ted in his apartment in New York City, hears in the newspaper that the great magician, Piccadilly, is putting on a magic show with an elephant named Kayla. He attempts to show Ted the news, but Ted is late for a meeting with Mr. Bloomsberry.

Mr. Bloomsberry is retiring and tells Ted he is the only candidate to replace him as head of the museum because he couldn't imagine not leaving his son Junior to run the museum, on the condition that Ted write a presentation on his vision for the museum, to be delivered in one week to the Board of Directors.

Maggie tells Ted his loved ones need more attention than his career, so Ted takes George to the magic show. When Piccadilly makes the elephant Kayla disappear, George goes looking and finds her in the basement. They stumble upon the exit. When Piccadilly finds Kayla missing he calls security led by Danno Wolfe, assisted by Mrs. Fisher. Danno is suspicious of Ted and George. At Ted's apartment George and Kayla see TV coverage of Kayla's home in a California animal park, with her brother Tonga and sister Layla.

Ted finds George and Kayla in the apartment. On their way back to return Kayla, George follows an advertisement for the "California Express" train. Ted can't get them out of the boxcar before it leaves the station. Danno thinks George and Ted have kidnapped Kayla. When George opens the boxcar door, Ted falls out trying to catch the pages of his presentation. At a small train station Ted calls Piccadilly, but doesn't manage to complete the call which makes Danno even more certain he kidnapped Kayla. Ted catches up with the train on the stationmaster's motorcycle.

Ted, George, and Kayla continue on the train until Kayla's movement causes the boxcar to separate from the rest of the train. When it finally stops a man in a flatbed truck picks them up. Piccadilly, interviewed by Hark Hanson, reveals pictures of George and Ted as Kayla's kidnappers. Ted realizes they have been heading the wrong way and attempts to head them back east again.

They spend the night with Dan, a farmer, and his daughter Anna. Ted reads in the newspaper that New York thinks they're kidnappers. Bloomsberry calls, saying he may go to jail. He also reads about Kayla's family. George convinces Ted to take Kayla to her home. Before they can leave, Danno arrives in a helicopter. A pig throws Danno into a rain barrel and Kayla scares the pilot into flying away. George and company escape in a school bus and arrive at the park where Tonga and Layla are happy to see Kayla. Danno turns up, captures Kayla and arrests George and Ted. Flying back to the city, George gets the handcuff keys from Danno and the friends skydive into New York. Back at the theater everything is fine, except Danno has followed them. Kayla throws him down the trapdoor onto the mattress below.

Ted gives his report to the Board of Directors. Initially flustered, he improvises a speech saying that friends are more important than work and makes proposals based on that idea, such as a Father and Son Day. The Board approves his appointment. While George, Ted, and Maggie are at the park setting up a picnic, Piccadilly and Tina arrive and reveal that Tonga and Layla have joined his act, so Kayla and her family are together again.

== Voice cast ==
- Frank Welker as Curious George, Duck, Cow
- Jeff Bennett as Ted (The Man with the Yellow Hat). Bennett reprises his role from the TV series, replacing Will Ferrell from the first film.
- Fred Tatasciore as Mr. Bloomsberry. Tatasciore replaces Dick Van Dyke from the first film.
- Nickie Bryar as Maggie Dunlop (replacing Drew Barrymore from the first film), Teenage Boy
- Ed O'Ross as Ivan
- Amy Hill as the Flower Pot Lady, Irate Woman
- Tim Curry as The Great Piccadilly
- Catherine Taber as Tina
- Jamie Kennedy as Danno Wolfe
- Matt Lauer as Hark Hanson
- Jerry Lewis as The Humbleton Stationmaster
- Cree Summer as Mrs. Fisher, Cargo Pilot, Young Girl
- Jeff McNeal as Kayla, Hog, Tonga & Layla
- Clint Howard as Farmer Dan
- Trupti Potdukhe as Anna
- Phil LaMarr as California Animal Park Attendant
- Carlos Alazraqui as Train Conductor, Newspaper Vendor

== Soundtrack ==
The soundtrack features the hit "California Sun" performed by Brian Wilson as well as all new songs by Carbon Leaf, a special title track recorded by 429 Records' artist Jackie Greene, and an original score by Heitor Pereira. Two tracks from Carbon Leaf, "Life Less Ordinary" and "Let Your Troubles Roll By", previously appeared on the band's 2004 album Indian Summer, but have re-recorded lyrics to fit the movie's theme. The soundtrack was released on March 2, 2010.

=== Track listing ===
1. "Life Less Ordinary" - Carbon Leaf
2. "The Friendship Song" - Carbon Leaf
3. "California Sun" - Brian Wilson
4. "On a Roll" - Carbon Leaf
5. "Heart of the Day" - Carbon Leaf
6. "Let Your Troubles Roll By" - Carbon Leaf
7. "Walking in the Sun" - Carbon Leaf
8. "Follow That Monkey" - Jackie Greene
9. "Moon Man" - Heitor Pereira
10. "Going East" - Heitor Pereira
11. "Giving a Hand" - Heitor Pereira
12. "Zoo" - Heitor Pereira
13. "The Friendship Song" - Heitor Pereira

== Release ==
Curious George 2: Follow That Monkey was released in the United States on March 2, 2010 as a direct-to-video release and received a theatrical release in select countries.

Curious George 2: Follow That Monkey grossed $2.2 million throughout its entire theatrical run in three countries. The film was theatrically released in Sweden, Iceland, and Denmark, with the latter generating the most revenue. The film opened in 50 theaters in Denmark and finished seventh for the weekend, grossing $64,158. The film stayed at ninth for its second and third weekends. The film closed its theatrical run in the country with $1.1 million in box office receipts. In Sweden, the film opened in 47 theaters and finished sixth for the weekend, grossing $59,500. The film did better in its second weekend, adding only one theater and staying at sixth but grossing $122,295 and going up 105.5%. The film closed out its theatrical run in the country with $1 million. In Iceland, the film only opened in three theaters and finished 12th, grossing $1,794 with an average of $598 per theater. The film closed out its run in the country with $12,946, making much less than its predecessor.

=== Home media ===
Curious George 2: Follow That Monkey along with the franchise is available on Hulu starting in 2016. The franchise was picked up by Peacock in 2020 where it is running concurrently with Hulu.

== Reception ==
Joly Herman of Common Sense Media awarded the film 4 out of 5 stars, writing that "cross-country caper with mild peril is OK for preschoolers". Bianca Schulze of The Children's Book Review wrote in her review: "Book characters in movies are a great way to connect reluctant readers with the wonderful world of books—The Man with the Yellow Hat and Curious George are so easy to like."

== Sequels ==
A sequel, titled Curious George 3: Back to the Jungle, was released to DVD and theaters on the same day, June 23, 2015. Curious George: Royal Monkey, the fourth film of the series, was released on DVD on September 10, 2019. Curious George: Go West, Go Wild, the fifth film of the series, was released on Peacock and DVD in September and December 2020, respectively. A sixth film, Curious George: Cape Ahoy, was released on Peacock exclusively on September 30, 2021.
