= Ghost Dragon Attacks Castle =

Studio album by Carbon Leaf
- Released: February 19, 2013
- Genre: adult album alternative, celtic rock
- Length: 51:38
- Label: Constant Ivy Music

Carbon Leaf chronology
Live, Acoustic...And In Cinemascope! (2011)	Ghost Dragon Attacks Castle (2013)	Constellation Prize (2013)

Ghost Dragon Attacks Castle is the eighth studio album by the band Carbon Leaf and was released on their own label, Constant Ivy Music.

== Track listing ==
All tracks are written by Carbon Leaf

No.	Title	Length
1.	"Bloody Good Bar Fight Song"	4:33
2.	"The Donnybrook Affair"	3:07
3.	"Ghost Dragon Attacks Castle"	2:49
4.	"She's Gone [...For Good This Time]"	4:02
5.	"Oi"	3:18
6.	"A Song for the Sea"	4:02
7.	"Februaery Detailles"	2:12
8.	"The Fox and the Hare"	4:17
9.	"I Love Victory!"	3:36
10.	"Amhrán Damhsa"	2:34
11.	"Sad and Alone"	4:52
12.	"The Road Is Breaking My Heart"	4:12
13.	"Bloody Good Bar Fight Song - Single"	4:47
14.	"The Donnybrook Affair - Single"	3:08
Total length:		51:38

== See also ==
- Carbon Leaf
