= 5 Alive! =

Live album by Carbon Leaf
- Released: August 12, 2003
- Genre: Adult album alternative
- Length: 116:19
- Label: Constant Ivy Music
- Producer: Carbon Leaf

Carbon Leaf chronology
Echo Echo (2001)	5 Alive! (2003)	Indian Summer (2004)

Professional ratings
Review scores
Source	Rating
Allmusic	3/5 stars

5 Alive! is the first live album released by the band Carbon Leaf. It was recorded over five concerts in the autumn and winter of 2002 and released in 2003 on the band's own label, Constant Ivy Music. It is their last release on their own label prior to signing with Vanguard Records in 2004.

== Track listing ==
Disc One
No.	Title	Length
1.	"Shine"	4:12
2.	"Home"	6:24
3.	"Big Strong Man"	2:48
4.	"Blue Ridge Laughing"	7:13
5.	"Torn To Tattered"	6:48
6.	"Is This The Fall?"	3:22
7.	"Wandrin' Around"	6:22
8.	"So Why?"	3:55
9.	"American Tale"	7:56
10.	"Crazy Train"	4:37

Disc Two
No.	Title	Length
1.	"Gloryland"	2:31
2.	"Maybe Today"	8:37
3.	"The Boxer"	4:50
4.	"Attica's Flower Box Window"	4:58
5.	"7 Brides For 7 Sinners"	2:50
6.	"Desperation Song"	6:52
7.	"Follow The Lady"	10:40
8.	"Days Gone By"	5:00
9.	"Traffic"	6:01
10.	"Toy Soldiers"	5:44
11.	"Mary Mac"	4:39
