= Lydia Netzer =

American novelist

Lydia Netzer is an American novelist.

Her debut novel Shine Shine Shine was named one of the 100 Notable Books of 2012 by The New York Times. The book tells the story of a pregnant woman with alopecia, her astronaut husband, their autistic son, and her mother, who is dying from cancer. The song Shine by Carbon Leaf provided inspiration for the book's title.

Netzer's second novel, How to Tell Toledo from the Night Sky, is about a pair of astrophysicists destined (through their mothers' planning) to fall in love.

== Books ==
- Shine, Shine, Shine, St. Martin's Press, 2012
- Everybody's Baby: A Novella, St. Martin's Press, 2014
- How to Tell Toledo from the Night Sky, St. Martin's Press, 2014
