= Ether~Electrified Porch Music =

Studio album by Carbon Leaf
- Released: November 1, 1999
- Genre: Adult album alternative
- Length: 57:29
- Label: Constant Ivy Music
- Producer: Carbon Leaf

Carbon Leaf chronology
| Shadows in the Banquet Hall (1997) | Ether~Electrified Porch Music (1999) | Echo Echo (2001) |

Professional ratings
Review scores
| Source | Rating |
|---|---|
| AllMusic | 2.5/5 stars |

Ether-Electrified Porch Music is a studio album by the rock band Carbon Leaf. It was released in 1999 on the band's own label, Constant Ivy Records.

== Critical reception ==
The Columbus Dispatch wrote that "Celtic sounds—tin whistle, bodhran, bagpipes—are just part of the mix, but the real focus is gently pleasing rock songs."

AllMusic thought that "in their less developed efforts, Carbon Leaf is still working on shaking the jam band-trying-to-make-good image, and they can be a bit repetitious, as on 'Aurora'."

== Track listing ==
1. "Ordinary Eyes" – 4:04
2. "Home" – 4:38
3. "Nowadays" – 5:11
4. "For Your Violin" – 4:36
5. "Blue Ridge Laughing" – 6:28
6. "Jan. 9, 63 Degrees" – 5:27
7. "American Tale" – 3:54
8. "To My Soul" – 4:42
9. "Kinakeet Island" – 5:33
10. "Traffic" – 4:07
11. "Clannanhide" – 4:30
12. "Aurora" – 4:18
