= Indian Summer (Carbon Leaf album) =

2004 album by Carbon Leaf

Studio album by Carbon Leaf
- Released: July 13, 2004
- Genre: Pop rock
- Length: 51:59
- Label: Vanguard
- Producer: John Morand

Carbon Leaf chronology
5 Alive! (2003)	Indian Summer (2004)	Love, Loss, Hope, Repeat (2006)

Singles from Indian Summer
- 1. "Life Less Ordinary" Released: 2004; 2. "What About Everything?" Released: 2005; 3. "Let Your Troubles Roll By" Released: 2005

Professional ratings
Review scores
Source	Rating
Allmusic	3.5/5 stars
Melodic	3.5/5 stars

Indian Summer is an album by Carbon Leaf, released on July 13, 2004 on Vanguard Records. Carbon Leaf's first major-label release, Indian Summer brought the band more popular attention and national radio airplay. The songs "Life Less Ordinary" and "Let Your Troubles Roll By" were re-recorded for the movie Curious George 2: Follow That Monkey.

== Track listing ==
All tracks are written by Carbon Leaf and Barry Privett

No.	Title	Length
1.	"Life Less Ordinary"	3:35
2.	"What About Everything?"	3:44
3.	"Changeless"	5:08
4.	"This Is My Song!"	4:01
5.	"Grey Sky Eyes"	3:42
6.	"Raise the Roof"	5:50
7.	"Paloma"	4:47
8.	"One Prairie Outpost"	3:19
9.	"Let Your Troubles Roll By"	5:26
10.	"When I'm Alone"	4:54
11.	"The Sea"	7:33
Total length:		51:59

== Charts ==
=== Singles ===
Chart performance for "Life Less Ordinary"
Chart (2004–2005)	Peak position
R&R Hot AC National Airplay	29
R&R Triple A National Airplay	5

Chart performance for "What About Everything?"
Chart (2005)	Peak position
R&R Triple A National Airplay	19

Chart performance for "Let Your Troubles Roll By"
Chart (2005)	Peak position
R&R Triple A National Airplay	27

== Indian Summer Revisited ==
Indian Summer Revisited

Studio album by Carbon Leaf
- Released: August 9, 2014
- Genre: Pop rock
- Length: 54:23
- Label: Constant Ivy Music

Carbon Leaf chronology
Constellation Prize (2013)	Indian Summer Revisited (2014)

Indian Summer Revisited is an album by Carbon Leaf released on August 9, 2014, on their Constant Ivy Music label. It is a re-recording of the album for its tenth anniversary. While their former record label, Vanguard Records, owns the master recordings for the album, the band owns the songs through their publishing company and label, Constant Ivy Music. The album was funded via the crowdfunding website Pledge Music.

While the original album featured original drummer Scott Milstead and longtime bassist Jordan Medas, the re-recorded album features Jason Neal, who joined the band in 2007, on drums and Jon Markel, who joined the band in 2008, on bass.

=== Track listing ===
All lyrics are written by Barry Privett; all music is composed by Carbon Leaf (Privett, Clark, Gravatt, Milstead, and Medas).

No.	Title	Length
1.	"Life Less Ordinary"	3:38
2.	"What About Everything?"	3:53
3.	"Changeless"	5:13
4.	"This Is My Song!"	4:02
5.	"Grey Sky Eyes"	3:49
6.	"Raise the Roof"	6:20
7.	"Paloma"	5:17
8.	"One Prairie Outpost"	3:23
9.	"Let Your Troubles Roll By"	5:42
10.	"When I'm Alone"	5:16
11.	"The Sea"	7:47
