= Nothing Rhymes with Woman =

Studio album by Carbon Leaf
- Released: May 19, 2009
- Recorded: 2008–2009
- Length: 57:27
- Label: Vanguard

Carbon Leaf chronology
Love, Loss, Hope, Repeat (2006)	Nothing Rhymes with Woman (2009)	How the West Was One (2010)

Professional ratings
Review scores
Source	Rating
AllMusic	3.5/5 stars

Nothing Rhymes with Woman is the seventh studio album by the Virginia band Carbon Leaf and their third on the Vanguard Records label. Recording for the album started in 2008 and it was released on May 19, 2009.

== Track listing ==
All music written by Carbon Leaf. All lyrics written by Barry Privett.

1. "Indecision" – 4:03
2. "Another Man's Woman" – 4:28
3. "Miss Hollywood" – 4:01
4. "Cinnamindy" – 4:07
5. "Lake of Silver Bells" – 5:35
6. "What Have You Learned?" – 3:28
7. "Mexico" – 4:13
8. "X-Ray" – 4:26
9. "Drops of Rain" – 4:14
10. "Meltdown" – 3:41
11. "Pink" – 4:02
12. "Snowfall Music " – 5:23
13. "Seed" – 5:47
14. "Lake Of Silver Bells" (Acoustic) - 5:33 (Amazon Exclusive)
15. "Tip Toe - 4:14 (Amazon Exclusive)
