= Christmas Child (EP) =

EP by Carbon Leaf
- Released: November 16, 2010
- Recorded: 2 Car Studio, Richmond, Virginia, 2010
- Genre: adult album alternative
- Length: 31:57
- Label: Constant Ivy Music

Carbon Leaf chronology
| How the West was One (2010) | Christmas Child (2010) | Live, Acoustic... and in Cinemascope! (2011) |

Christmas Child is an EP by the band Carbon Leaf that was released on their own label, Constant Ivy Music.

== Track listing ==
All tracks are written by Carbon Leaf

| No. | Title | Length |
|---|---|---|
| 1. | "Christmas Child" | 4:04 |
| 2. | "Red Punch / Green Punch" | 3:08 |
| 3. | "Ice And Snow" | 3:29 |
| 4. | "Sutton's Reel" | 4:06 |
| 5. | "Ode To The Snow" | 4:38 |
| 6. | "Drifting" | 1:32 |
| 7. | "Christmas At Sea" | 3:50 |
| 8. | "Christmas Child (Instrumental)" | 3:04 |
| 9. | "Toast To the New Year" | 4:06 |
| Total length: | | 31:57 |
