= Karma (2008 Indian film) =

- Directed by: M R Shahjahan
- Written by: Vivek Singhania; Amit Mehra
- Produced by: Vivek Singhania; Sanjiv Potnis; Dhiraj Kotkar
- Starring: Carlucci Weyant; Alma Grey
- Cinematography: Lucio Cremonese
- Edited by: Alexandra Wedenig
- Music by: Sunna Wehrmeijer
- Production companies: Golden Ticket Films; Picture Perfect
- Distributed by: TriCoast International
- Release date: 15 May 2008 (Cannes Film Festival)
- Language: English

Karma: Crime. Passion. Reincarnation is a psychological thriller, filmed in India, that touches upon reincarnation. The film was premiered at the Cannes Film Festival, and it went on to win various awards including Best Picture at the Marbella Film Festival in Spain.

== Plot ==
Vik, played by Carlucci Weyant, estranged and separated from his father, Ranvir (Vijayendra Ghatge), for the past thirty years, visits him in Ooty with his bride Anna, played by Alma S. Grey, from New York City at her insistence, but only for a day or two. The moment Anna alights from the train that brings them to the small town, she unwittingly becomes the medium of events including visions of a murder that took place in the woods surrounding Vik’s father’s home thirty years ago.

With little love by Vik for his father, it is Anna, an orphan, who conspires with her father-in-law to change Vik’s mind about staying longer and taking over his father’s business. The hauntings now become more frequent and intense, making Anna sick to the point of her mental state of mind questioned.

Even though Anna had never set foot in India, let alone Ooty district of Tamil Nadu before, she seems very familiar with the surroundings and even some people. Anna begins to question some people who then see her as a threat. The nightmares occur more frequently and with more specificity. At first Vik accuses Anna of having some ingrained psychological problems, which hurt Anna deeply - but when strange inexplicable events happen to Vik himself, he apologizes to Anna.

Vik resolves to help Anna and when it is discovered that a murder had indeed taken place thirty years ago, together they try to solve the mystery. The spirit of Linda (Claudia Ciesla), raped and murdered thirty years ago, reincarnated as Anna, leads Anna and Vik to the discovery of murderer's identity.

Sehban Azim played a small role in the film as Rocky.

== Cast ==
- Alma S. Grey as Anna
- Carlucci Weyant as Vikram 'Vik' Singh
- Claudia Ciesla as Linda
- DJ Perry as Inspector Khushroo
- Vijayendra Ghatge as Ranvir
- Shanda Renee as Emma
- Sehban Azim as Rocky
- Saurabh Raj Jain as Vijay (Linda's Lover)

== Background ==
The first Mumbai previews of Karma were held on 4 May 2009, in Ketnav Theatre, Bandra, Mumbai. German Model Claudia Ciesla plays one of the lead characters "Linda" in this film.

The film was awarded Best Costumes and Best Sets in the Corinthian International Film Festival (CIFF) in Corinthia in Greece and Best Feature Film at the Marbella International Film Festival. The film was selected as the Opening Night's attraction at the Osian's Cinefan Film Festival in New Delhi on 10 July 2008. The film was screened at the Cannes film festival market on 16 and 21 May 2008 and was sold to the US distributor TriCoast Worldwide (except for the Indian Market).

== See also ==
- Karma
