= How the West Was One (Carbon Leaf EP) =

EP by Carbon Leaf
- Released: July 6, 2010
- Recorded: 2 Car Studio, Richmond, Virginia, 2010
- Genre: adult album alternative
- Length: 35:49
- Label: Constant Ivy Music

Carbon Leaf chronology
Nothing Rhymes with Woman (2009)	How the West Was One (2010)	Christmas Child (2010)

How the West Was One is an EP by the band Carbon Leaf that was released on their own label, Constant Ivy Music. It is the band's first release since announcing on March 20, 2010 in a radio interview on WCNR that they were leaving Vanguard Records with the aim to release music more frequently and via media other than CD. Recording for the EP was completed in June 2010 and it was released on July 6, 2010 for purchase at concerts and on July 20 for purchase from their website.

On July 13 Shawn Stewart of the radio station 103.7 the mountain released on her blog an email from Terry Clark that was directed to friends and family which contained links to download the EP for free. Soon thereafter she received a request from Barry Privett, the lead singer, to remove the links.

== Track listing ==
All tracks are written by Carbon Leaf

No.	Title	Length
1.	"Native America"	5:08
2.	"Crossroads"	6:26
3.	"If I Were A Cowboy"	6:32
4.	"Midwestern Girl"	5:02
5.	"Unknown Bride"	4:34
6.	"1 Wolf, 2 Wolf, 3 Wolf, 4"	3:18
7.	"For The First Time"	4:53
Total length:		35:49
