= Meander (album) =

Studio album by Carbon Leaf
- Released: January 1, 1995
- Genre: adult album alternative
- Length: 49:12
- Label: Constant Ivy Music
- Producer: Carbon Leaf

Carbon Leaf chronology
| Meander (1995) | Shadows in the Banquet Hall (1997) |

Meander is Carbon Leaf's first album. It was released in 1995 by the band's own label, Constant Ivy Records.

== Track listing ==
Meander track listing
| No. | Title | Length |
|---|---|---|
| 1. | "Directional" | 3:39 |
| 2. | "Clockwork" | 3:55 |
| 3. | "One Day" | 3:46 |
| 4. | "Weird Guy Haus" | 2:53 |
| 5. | "Kettle" | 3:51 |
| 6. | "Skeleton Man Dance" | 4:51 |
| 7. | "Strain" | 3:54 |
| 8. | "Paper Thin" | 4:24 |
| 9. | "Live Like You" | 4:57 |
| 10. | "Country Monkee" | 4:21 |
| 11. | "Winter's Dream" | 3:40 |
| 12. | "Shellfish" | 5:01 |
| Total length: | | 49:52 |
