= Trans-Catalina Trail =

Long-distance hiking trail in California

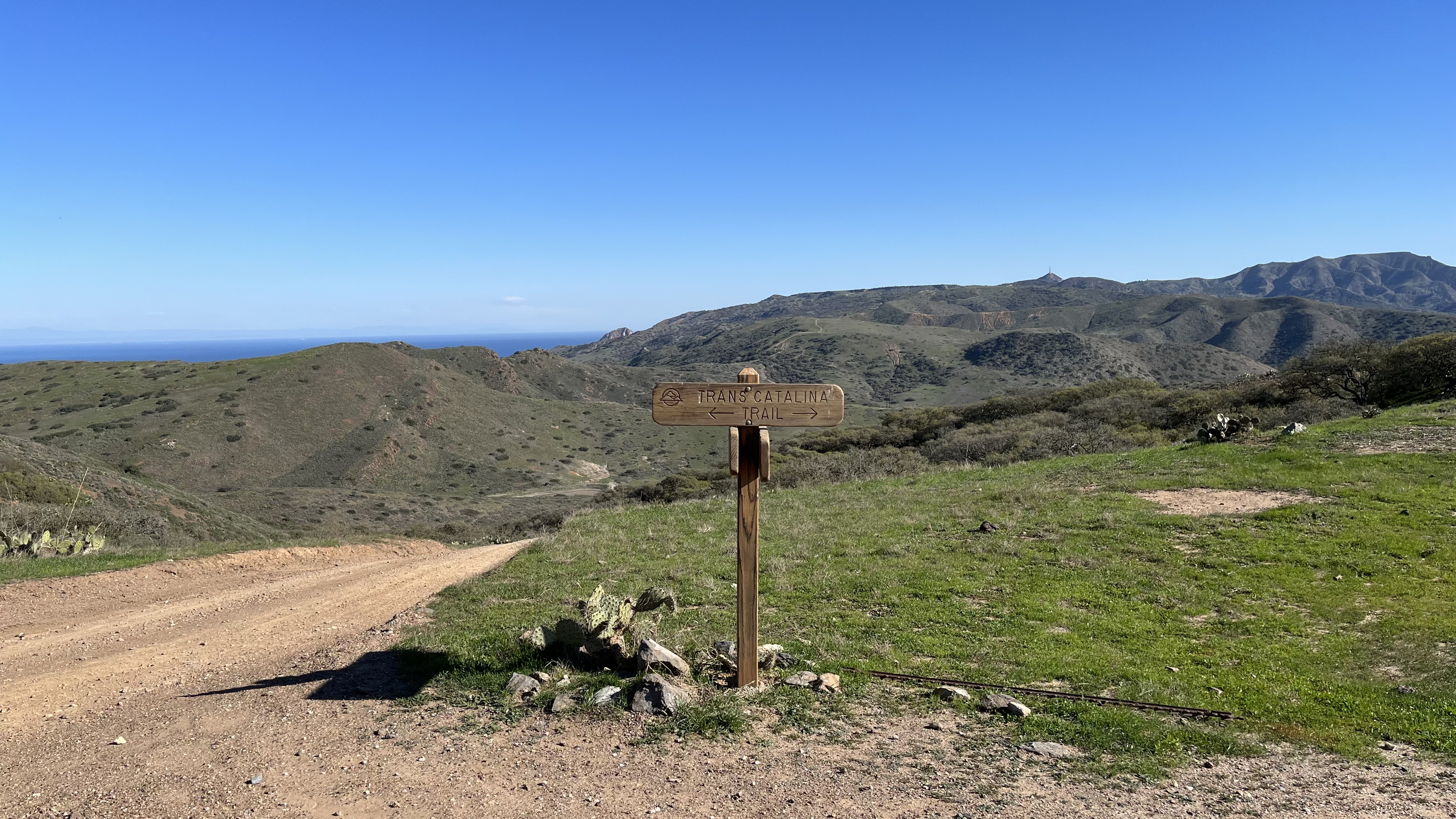
- Length: 38.5 mi (62.0 km)
- Location: California, United States
- Trailheads: South: 33.3428°N 118.3245°W; North: 33.4403°N 118.4988°W
- Use: backpacking, hiking, trail running
- Elevation change: 9,600 ft (2,900 m)
- Highest point: 1,775 ft (541 m)
- Lowest point: Parson's Landing, 0 ft (0 m)
- Difficulty: Moderate to strenuous
- Months: Year-round

The Trans-Catalina Trail is a long-distance trail which traverses Santa Catalina Island off the coast of southern California. From the eastern trailhead where Clarissa Avenue meets Crescent Avenue in Avalon out to Parson's Landing on the West end, then looping back to Two Harbors, the trail's official length is listed as 38.5 miles (62.0 km). Camping is allowed by permit from the Catalina Island Conservancy. There are five campgrounds along or near the trail: Hermit Gulch, Black Jack, Little Harbor, Two Harbors, and Parsons Landing. Hikers usually take between 2 and 5 days to complete the route.

== Gallery ==
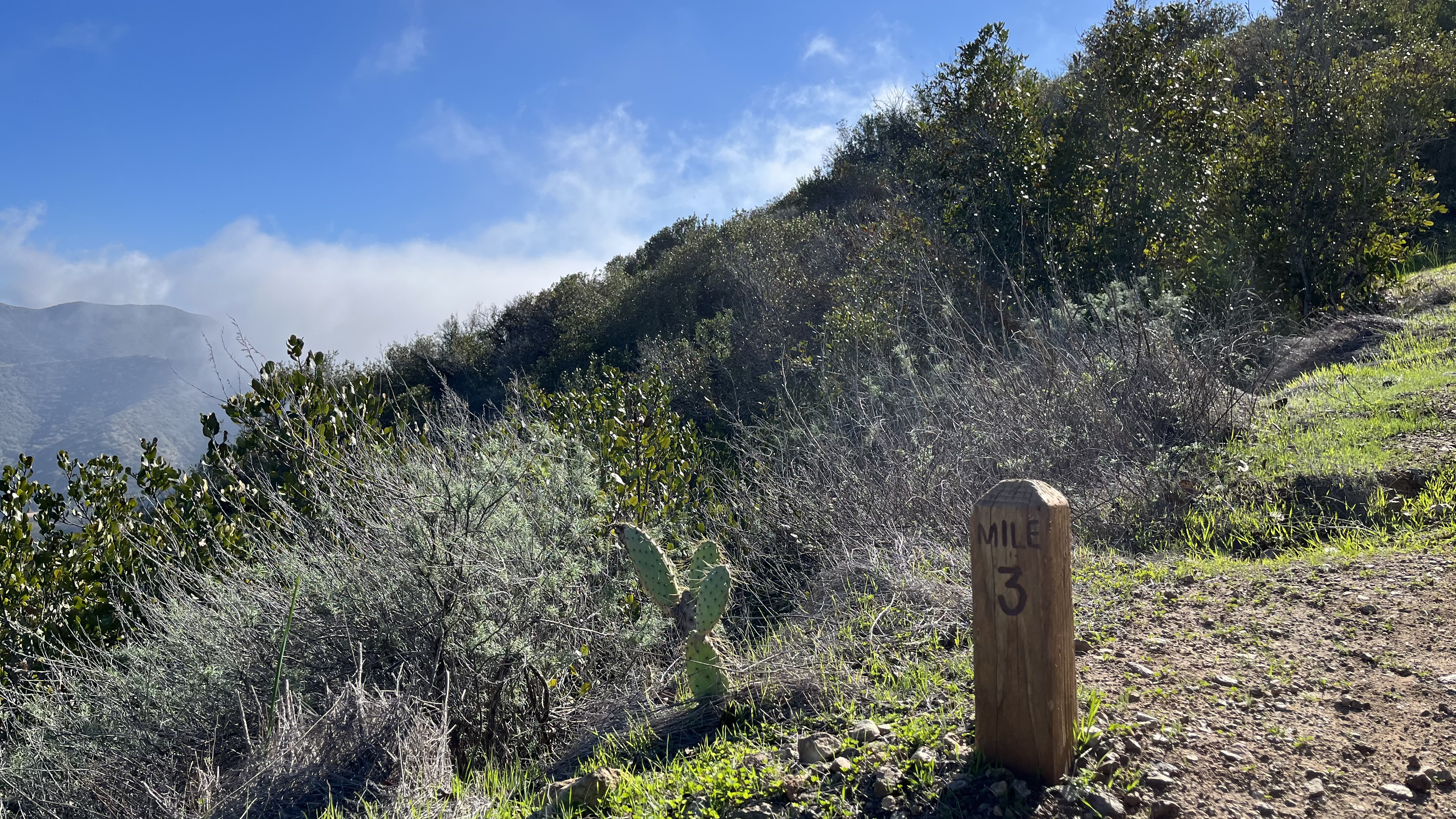
Mile Marker 3 on the trail

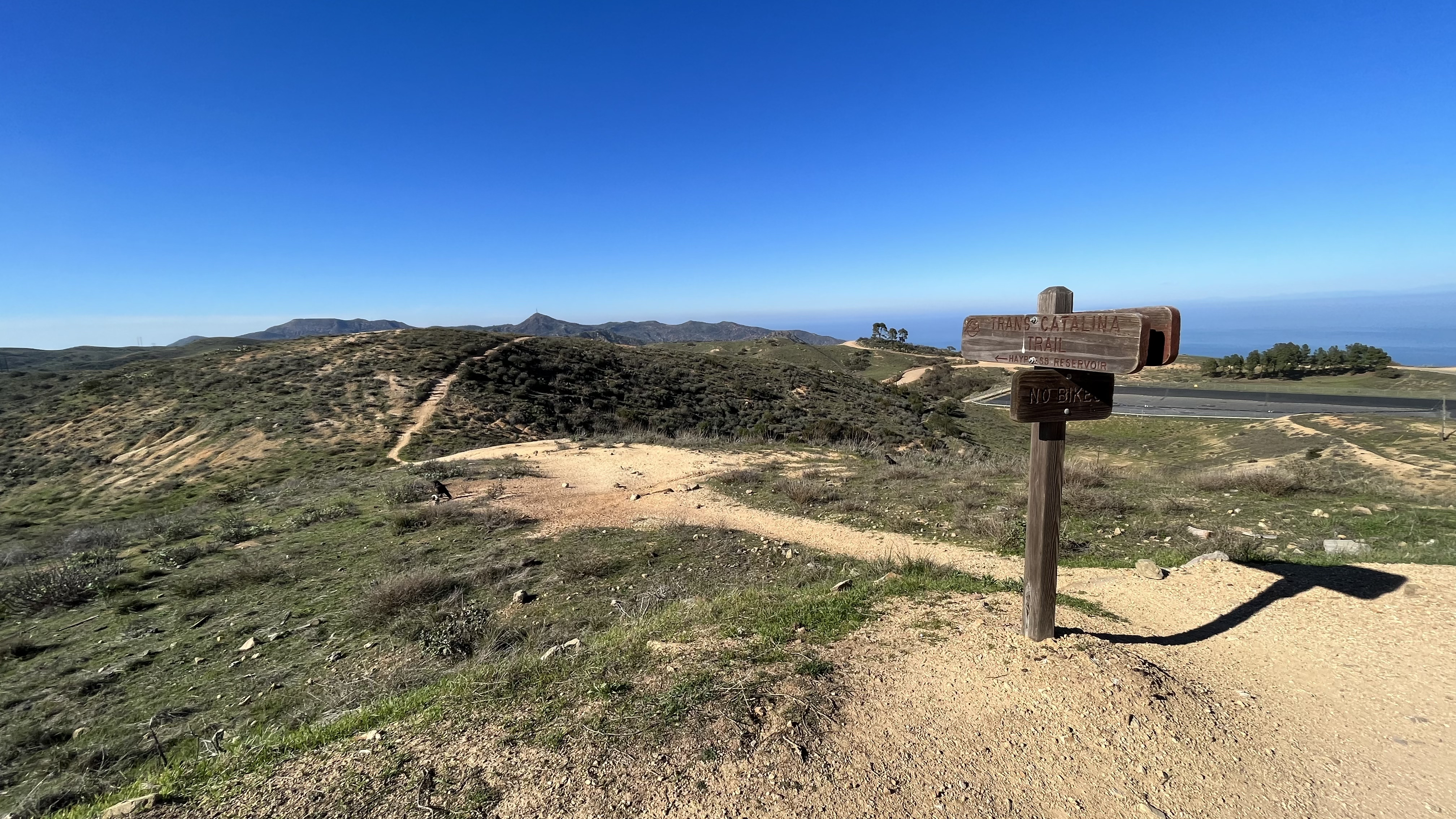
Sign marking the direction of the trail

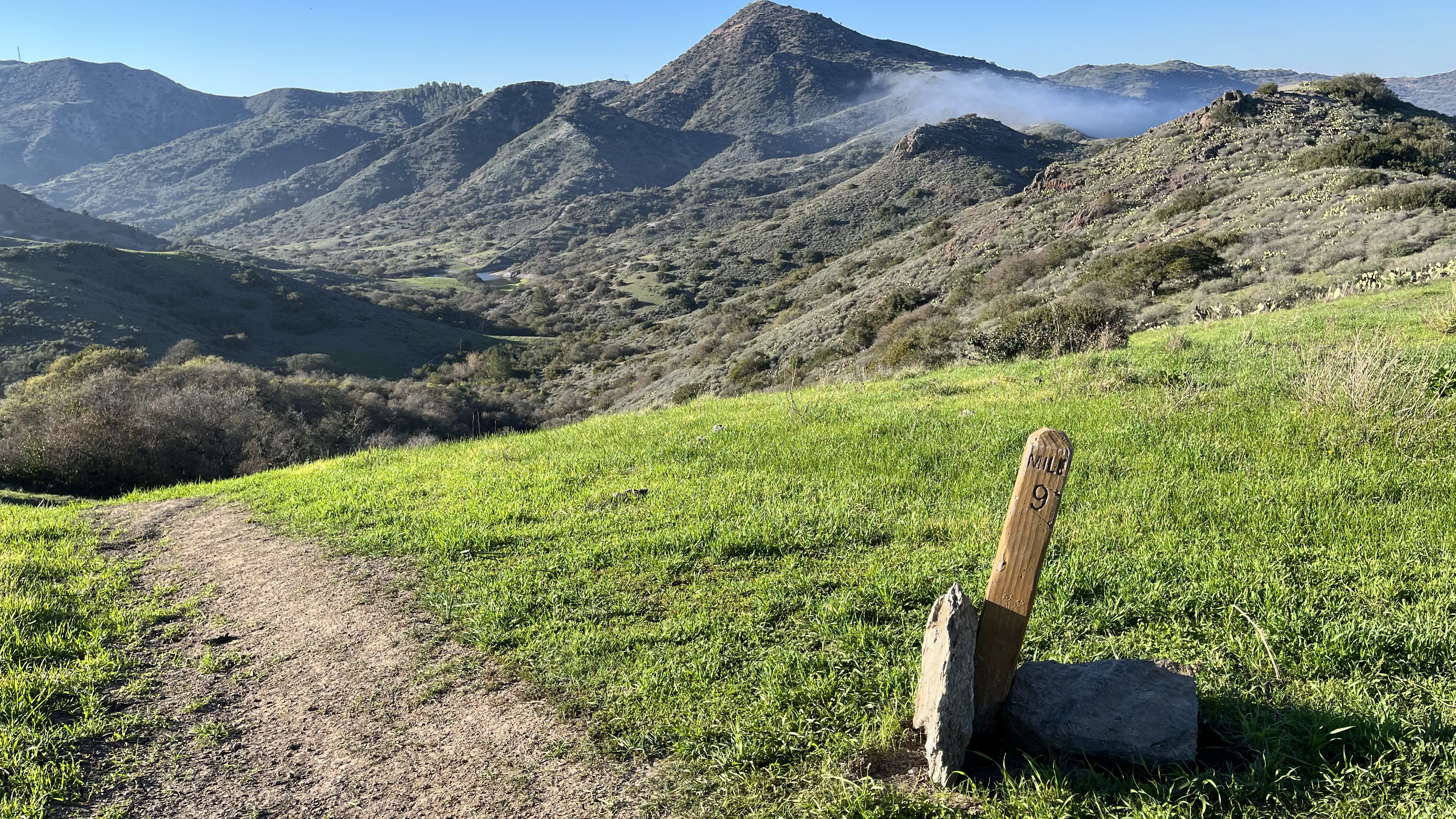
Mile Marker 9 on the trail

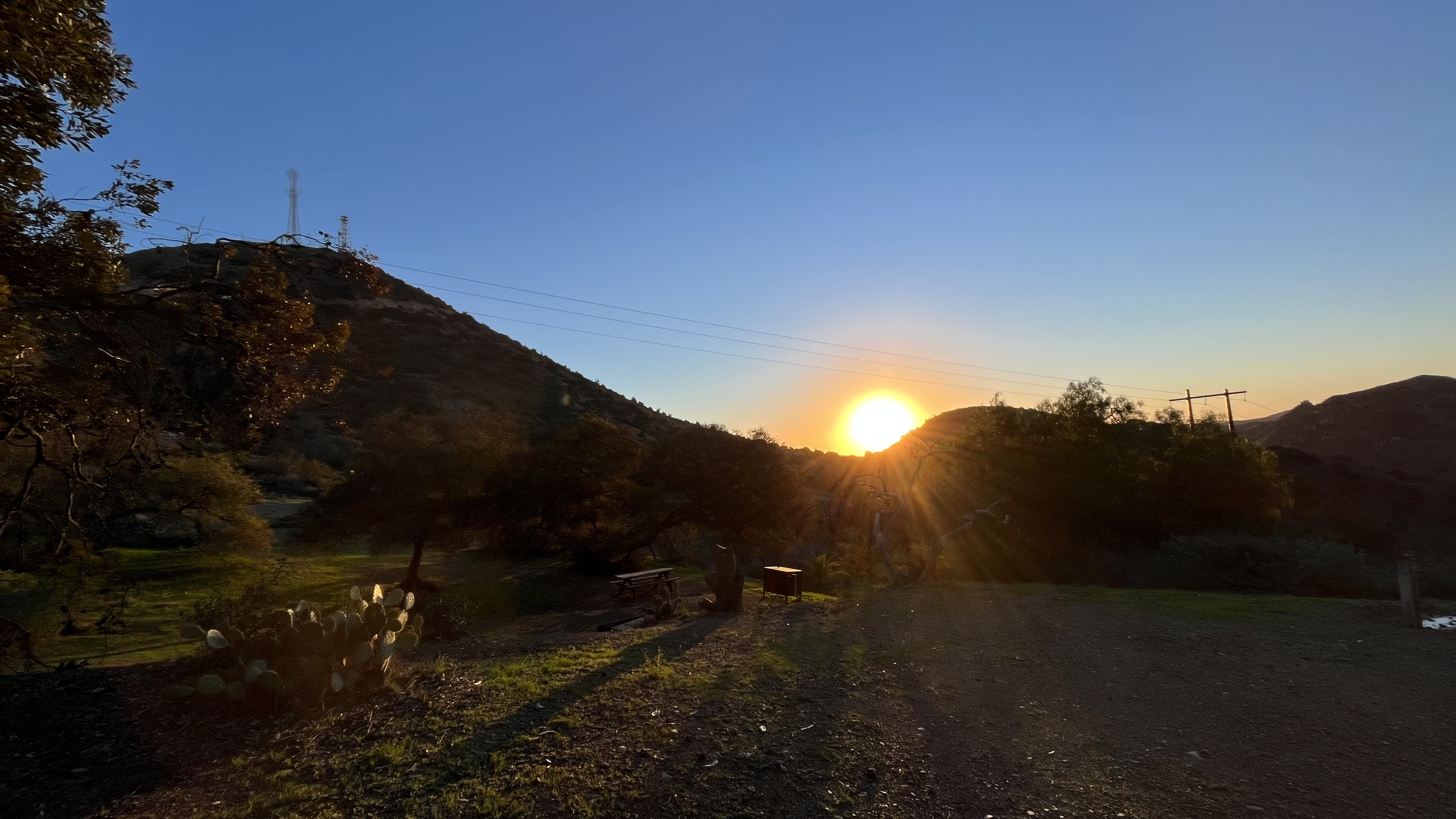
Sunrise from the Black Jack Campground

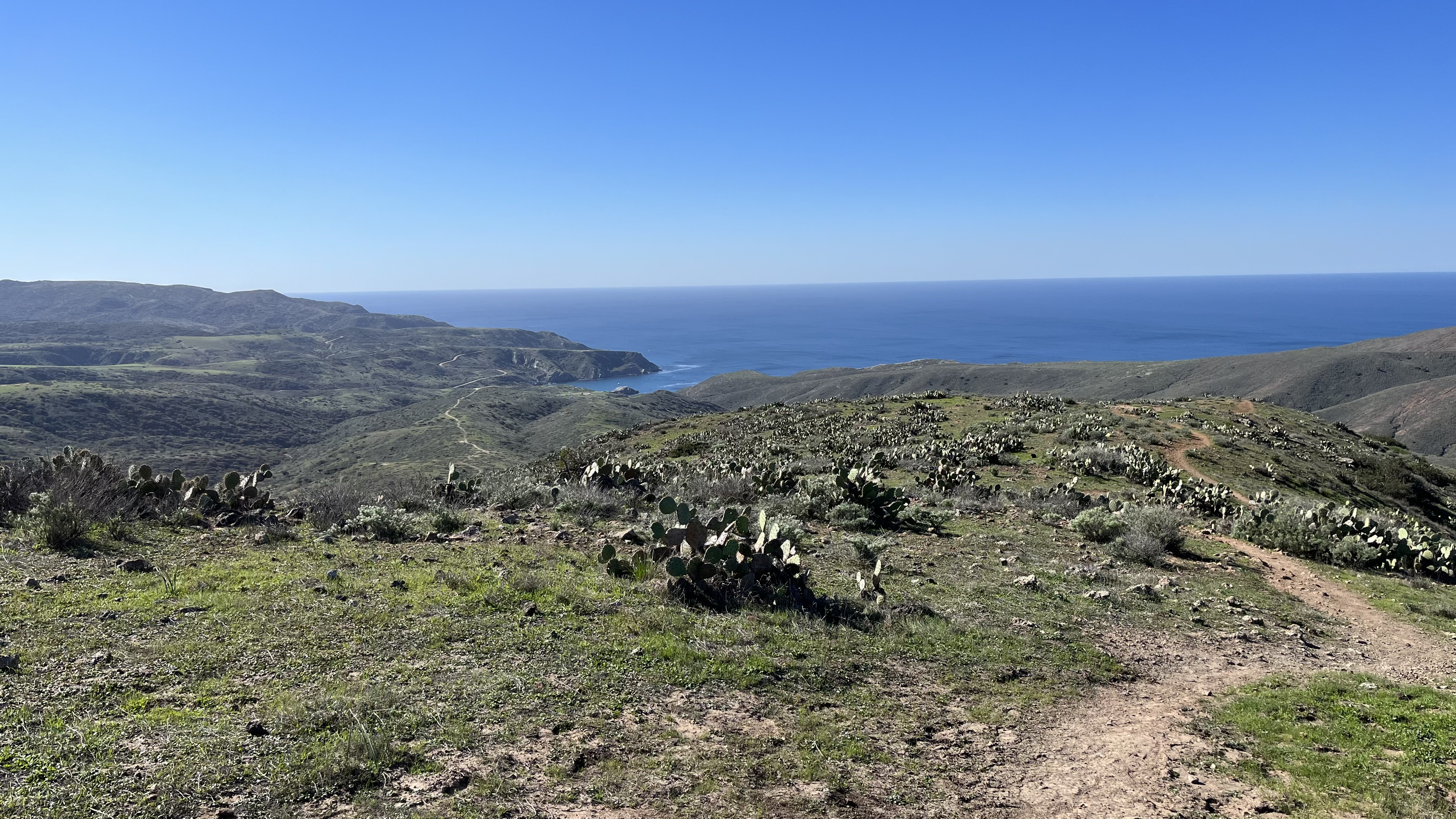
The trail approaching Little Harbor

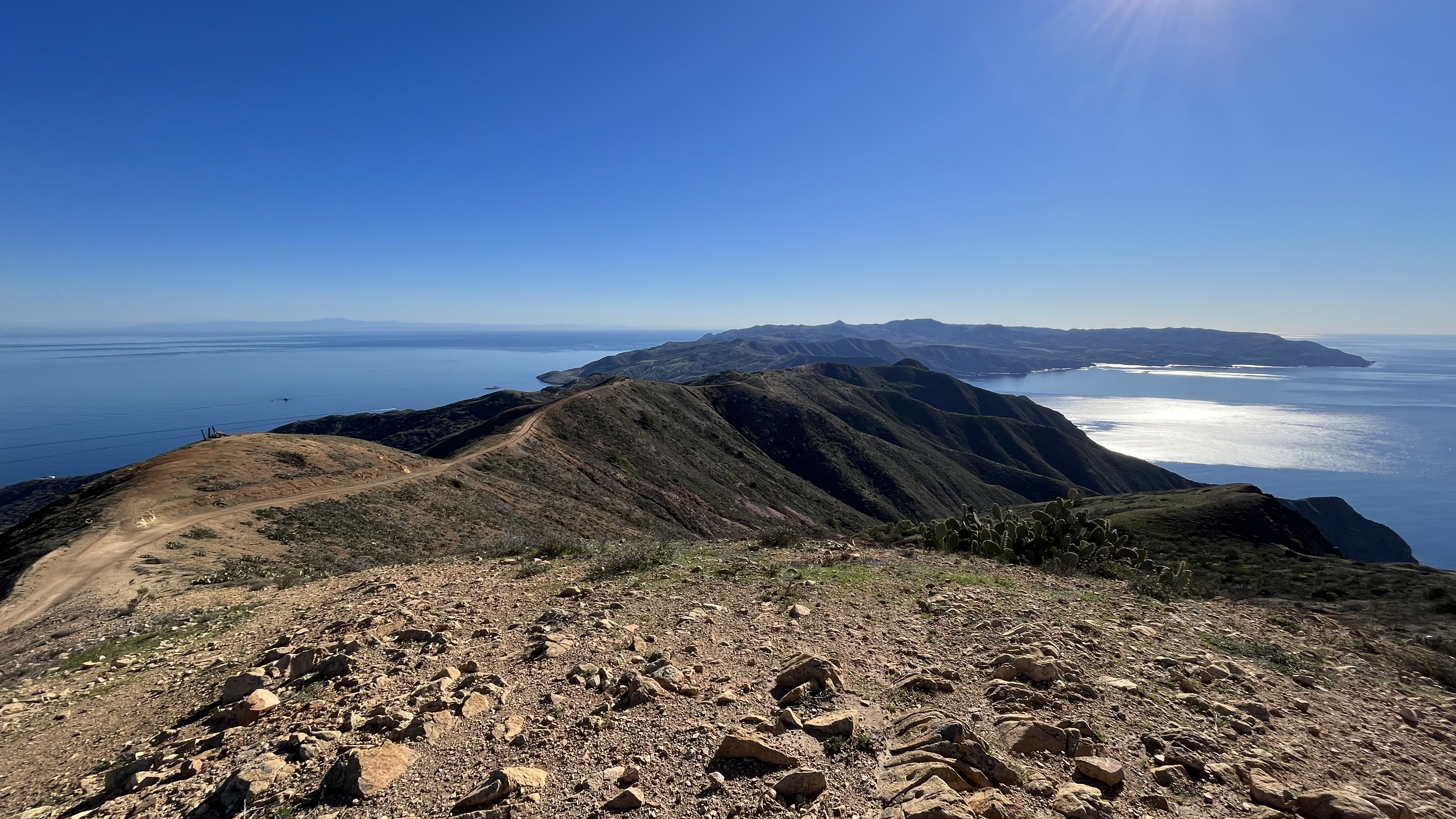
On the western side of the Trans-Catalina Trail looking east towards Two Harbors

== See also ==
- Long-distance trails in the United States
