= Live, Acoustic... And in Cinemascope! =

Live, Acoustic...and in Cinemascope!

Live album by Carbon Leaf
- Released: May 3, 2011
- Genre: adult album alternative
- Length: 1:28:09
- Label: Constant Ivy Music

Carbon Leaf chronology
Christmas Child (2010)	Live, Acoustic...and in Cinemascope! (2011)	Ghost Dragon Attacks Castle (2013)

Live, Acoustic...and in Cinemascope! is a live album by the band Carbon Leaf that was released on their own label, Constant Ivy Music.

== Track listing ==
All tracks are written by Carbon Leaf

No.	Title	Length
1.	"What About Everything?"	4:10
2.	"Wolftrap and Fireflies"	4:44
3.	"November (Make Believe)"	5:08
4.	"Lake of Silver Bells"	5:52
5.	"Miss Hollywood"	4:47
6.	"On Any Given Day"	5:55
7.	"One Prairie Outpost"	3:50
8.	"Another Man's Woman"	4:37
9.	"Attica's Flower Box Window"	4:46
10.	"Comfort"	4:06
11.	"Pink"	4:55
12.	"Block of Wood"	4:32
13.	"Learn to Fly"	5:00
14.	"7 Brides for 7 Sinners"	3:08
15.	"Life Less Ordinary"	5:09
16.	"Blue Ridge Laughing"	6:48
17.	"Let Your Troubles Roll By"	6:36
18.	"The Boxer"	4:06
Total length:		1:28:09
