= Wicked Spring =

- Film poster
- Directed by: Kevin Hershberger
- Written by: Kevin Hershberger
- Produced by: DJ Perry; Curtis Hall; Anthony Hornus
- Starring: Brian Merrick; Terry Jernigan; Aaron Jackson; DJ Perry
- Cinematography: Stephen Lyons
- Edited by: Sunny Zhao
- Music by: David Russell
- Production company: LionHeart FilmWorks
- Distributed by: Ardustry Home Entertainment; Parables TV Network
- Release date: June 1, 2002 (United States)
- Running time: 102 minutes
- Country: United States
- Language: English
- Budget: $500,000

Wicked Spring is a 2002 American historical-based dramatic war film directed, produced, and written by Kevin Hershberger, as his first narrative feature film. The fictional portrayal is based on several actual events from the American Civil War, notably fictionalizing an event that took place in 1862 during the Battle of Crampton's Gap. The film focuses on a Harrison Bolding, a Confederate soldier in 1864 who, at night and with two other soldiers from his company, becomes lost while in conflict at the Battle of the Wilderness. The three meet and befriend a trio of Union soldiers that night, but don't realize it until the next morning when the six find themselves trapped between Union and Confederate defenses.

Wicked Spring had a budget of an estimated $500,000, and while initially screening only at film festivals, aired for the first time on ABC Television WJRT in June 2005.

The film was produced by Richard J. Perry (DJ Perry) and executive-produced by Leonard J. Krawezyk for LionHeart FilmWorks, and the MPAA rated the film PG-13.

== Plot ==
In 1861, Harrison Bolding (Brian Merrick) bid farewell to his wife and went off to war. In 1864, during the Battle of the Wilderness, as fighting wears down and night begins to fall, Bolding and two other soldiers, James Hogg (Terry Jernigan) and After Stand Kennerly (Aaron Jackson) get separated from their company and in the darkness they become lost in the thick woods. They happen to run into three other soldiers, John Sunderlin (DJ Perry), Augustus Elliot (Curtis Hall), and Pietro Brolo (Mark Lacy) without realizing they are soldiers from the opposite side. The six weary men socialize by the campfire, telling stories and sharing any food they have left.

When the sun rises the next morning, the soldiers realize they are from different sides of the conflict. As tensions grow, they are also stuck in between the rest of the Confederate and Union soldiers, approaching each other. The two sides come closer and closer, before firing simultaneously. The barrage of fire kills all the men, ending the movie.

== Cast ==
- Brian Merrick as Harrison Bolding
- Terry Jernigan as James Hogg
- Aaron Jackson as After Stand Kennerly
- DJ Perry as John Sunderlin
- Curtis Hall as Augustus Elliot
- Mark Lacy as Pietro Brolo
- Rebecca Lawlor as Parthenia Sunderlin
- Lindsey Ingram as Virginia Gordon
- Rebecca Lawlor as Parthenia Sunderlin
- John D. Pagano as Confederate Major
- Anthony Hornus as Union Colonel Holden

== Production ==
The Battle of the Wilderness took place in Spotsylvania and Orange County, Virginia. While all filming was shot in Virginia, none occurred at the actual battle site.

Filming was conducted over 29 total days between January and August 2000 at five different locations throughout Virginia. Total cast includes approximately 100 actors and re-enactors from across the United States.

Director Kevin Hershberger reunited almost the entire cast and crew from his previous short film, "The Nest" for the production of Wicked Spring.

Production was confirmed in December 1999, with announcement of plans to film in Virginia during 2000. To maximize the budget, filming was broken up over most of 2000. The opening of the picture was shot over several days in January 2000, then production broke while the actors grew beards and longer hair and lost weight to film the battle scenes at the end of March and early April 2000. Gathering additional budget money, the production then shot in May 2000 for all of the character scenes of meeting in the woods at night, campfire and morning wake up before the next day's battle. With rain and other natural elements disrupting filming, production shot for an additional 3 days in August 2000 (at a different filming location) to finish out the film, shooting the important "letter writing" sequence which is important for the end of the second act.

The band Carbon Leaf wrote "Dear" as an original song for the movie's closing credits. The song appears as a hidden track on their 2001 album Echo, Echo.

== Recognition ==
=== Awards and nominations ===
- 2002, won 'Best Action Film' at New York International Film and TV Festival
- 2002, won 'Best Feature Film - Action' Genre Award at New York International Independent Film & Video Festival
- 2002, won 'Best Director Feature Film Award' at New York International Independent Film & Video Festival
- 2002, won 'Michigan's Own Award' for 'Best Feature Film' at East Lansing Film Festival
- 2002, won 'Best Cinematography' at Great Lakes International Film Festival
- 2004, won 'Best Action/Drama' at Los Angeles International Film Festival

=== Filming locations ===
- Fort Pickett (Blackstone, VA)
- Frontier Culture Museum of Virginia (Staunton, VA)
- Petersburg, VA
- Science Museum of Virginia (Richmond, VA)
- VMI (Lexington, VA)

== See also ==
- No Man's Land
