= Carl Weyant =

American actor

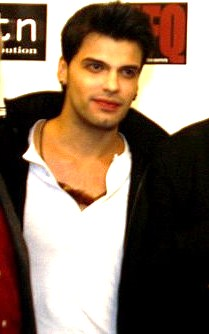
- Born: Carl Weyant; October 4, 1983 (age 42); New York, U.S.
- Occupation: Actor
- Years active: 2003 – Present
- Website: www.splitvisionent.com

Carl Weyant (born October 4, 1983) is an American actor, writer, producer, model and musician who has appeared in Karma: Crime, Passion and Reincarnation, Elle: A Modern Cinderella Tale The Young and the Restless and recently worked with Danny Glover, Michael Rooker, and famed actor Martin Landau in the psychological thriller Mysteria

== Career ==
Shortly after arriving in Los Angeles, Weyant received roles in numerous low-budget independent features including Stray directed by Johnny Yong Bosch, and The Memory Thief. He then appeared as Thad Warner in The Young and the Restless. Since that time, Weyant has worked steadily in Hollywood, appearing in Several films and TV show.

In 2008, Weyant made his debut as the male lead in the film Karma: Crime, Passion, Reincarnation, which showed at the Cannes Film Festival in May 2008.

In 2009, Weyant went on to portray the role of Randy Dedd in the Dark comedy Dedd Brothers directed and written by Dustin Schuetter. Weyant then produced the family movie Elle: A Modern Cinderella Tale alongside John Dunson and Sean Dunson of Frame of Mind Entertainment. Elle won an audience award at the 2010 Newport Beach Film Festival.

During the end of 2009, Weyant formed "Split | Vision| Entertainment" for the production of full-length feature films. In 2010, Weyant partnered with Dustin Schuetter to co-develop, executive produce, produce and act on the award winning dark film Samuel Bleak, which starred Deborah Kara Unger, David Zayas, James Russo, Keith David and co-producer Dustin Schuetter. Samuel Bleak premiered at Cinequest Film Festival in the historic California Theatre on March 5, 2011, showed at the Sarasota Film Festival and competed at the First Santa Catalina Film Festival in Catalina, CA. Samuel Bleak has also been nominated for the 2011 which is sponsored by the U.S. Department of Health and Human Services, Substance Abuse and Mental Health Services Administration, and Center for Mental Health Services. The Voice Awards honor leaders who have done exemplary work promoting the social inclusion of individuals with behavioral health problems.

== Current ==
Weyant is currently producing Jake Stevens: The Last Protector with Dunson Twin Films for a theatrical release late 2014. According to an interview by Movie Vine, Weyant joined rock group Dead by Choice and is currently working on an untitled E.P. Weyant starred in the feature film Ashes of Eden in which is set to come out in theaters early 2014.

== Filmography ==
Film
Year	Film	Role	Notes
2006	Scattered and Saved	Ramone	
2007	The Memory Thief	Actor	
2008	Karma: Crime, Passion, Reincarnation	Vic	Best Feature Marbella, Spain; Best Costumes and Art Direction Corinthian Film Festival, Greece
2009	Dedd Brothers	Rande Dedd	
2010	A Minor League Story	Associate Producer/Casting Associate	
2010	Locked in a Room	Blake	
2010	Elle: A Modern Cinderella Tale	Actor/Producer	Best Family Film, Newport Beach Film Festival
2010	Samuel Bleak	Dexter/Producer	Best Feature Film: Suspense New York City
2011	Benjamin	Benjamin/Producer	
2011	Mysteria	Jack	Premiered at the Beverly Hills Film, TV & New Media Festival
2012	Love Letters in the Sand	Mark	
2012	Jake Stevens: The Last Protector	Producer	
2012	Chapo	Robert "Chapo" Chapman	
2014	Ashes of Eden	Carlos	
Television
Year	Title	Role	Notes
2006–2008	The Young and the Restless	Thad Warner	Select Episodes
