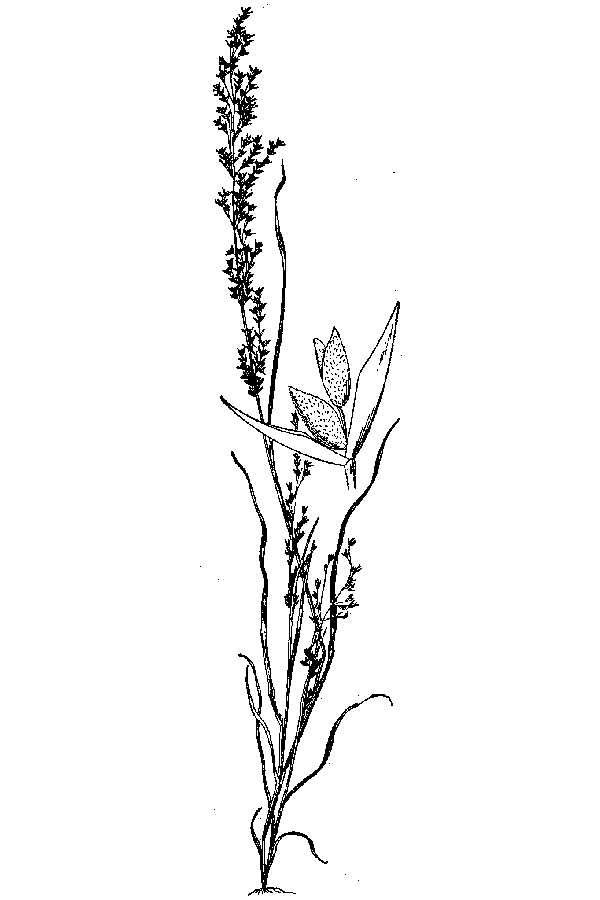

Conservation status
- Imperiled (NatureServe)

Scientific classification
- Kingdom: Plantae
- Clade: Tracheophytes
- Clade: Angiosperms
- Clade: Monocots
- Clade: Commelinids
- Order: Poales
- Family: Poaceae
- Genus: Dissanthelium
- Species: D. californicum

Binomial name
- Dissanthelium californicum (Nutt.) Benth.

Synonyms
- Poa thomasii Refulio

= Dissanthelium californicum =

Species of flowering plant

Dissanthelium californicum (California dissanthelium, Catalina grass) is a rare species of grass in the family Poaceae. It was originally discovered on Santa Catalina, an island off California's coast in 1847 by U.S. botanist and naturalist William Gambel. It was later identified as growing on Guadalupe Island (off Baja California Peninsula), on San Clemente Island and Catalina Island (both off southern California).

Last seen in 1912, Dissanthelium californicum was generally thought to be extinct, until examples were found on March 29, 2005, by Jenny McCune of the Catalina Island Conservancy on Catalina Island. In 2010, two populations were found on San Clemente Island. It has not reappeared on Guadalupe Island.

== See also ==
- Lazarus taxon
