= DJ Perry =

American actor

- Born: Richard Jeffrey Perry; June 23, 1970 (age 55); Lansing, Michigan; United States
- Other name: Richard J. Perry
- Occupations: Actor; Producer; Screenwriter; Cinematographer; Stuntman; Composer
- Years active: 1996–present

DJ Perry (born June 23, 1970, in Lansing, Michigan, U.S.) is an American actor, film producer, and screenwriter.

== Career ==
A graduate of Michigan State University, as CEO of Collective Development Inc. and former vice-president of Lionheart Filmworks he has overseen or assisted in the overall production of over 20 feature films in various genres, including films such as Wicked Spring, An Ordinary Killer, and Dean Teaster's Ghost Town. He has also produced commercials for companies such as Toyota and JBL. Several of his scripts have been produced into feature-length motion pictures; and two of his scripts, Ghost Town and Wild Michigan have been novelized into book form via Alexander Press.

As an actor, Perry has appeared in films such as Karma (2008) starring Carl Weyant and Claudia Ciesla; Miracle at Sage Creek (2005) starring David Carradine; and An Ordinary Killer (2004) starring Terence Knox, Dennis Haskins and Dan Haggerty.

== Filmography ==
- Sherwood Horror (2010)
- Wild Michigan (2010)
- A State of Hate (2010)
- The Science of Cool (2010)
- Just Me and Jose (2010)
- Holly, Jingles and Clyde 3D (2010)
- You'll Never Amount to Anything (2010)
- Timberwolf (2010)
- Buds (2010)
- The Throwaways (2010)
- Sound of Mind (2010)
- Scarlet Creek (2009)
- Book of Ruth (2009)
- Blood Ties (2009)
- Night Fall (2008)
- You'll Never Amount to Anything
- Judges: Devil's Bayou (2008)
- Book of Ruth (2008)
- Dog (2008)
- The Stalker Within (2008)
- Ghost Town: The Movie (2007)
- G.P.S. (2007)
- The 8th Plague (2006)
- Talent (2006)
- Ouija (2006)
- Miracle at Sage Creek (2005)
- Heaven's Neighbors (2005)
- From Venus (2005)
- Judges (2005)
- Justice for All (2005)
- Keson (2005)
- The Patchwork Girl of Oz (2005)
- An Ordinary Killer (2003)
- Tangy Guacamole (2003)
- Survive! (2003)
- Below (2002)
- Wicked Spring (2002)
- Figure in the Forest (2002)
- Outlaw Prophet (2001)
- Knight Chills (2001)
- The Flock (2001)
- Losing Grace (2001)
- In the Woods (1999)
- The Nest (1999)
- Autumn Winds (1999)
- Springheel Jack (1997)
- One of Us (1996)
