= Love, Loss, Hope, Repeat =

Studio album by Carbon Leaf
- Released: September 12, 2006
- Recorded: 2004–2006
- Genre: Adult alternative
- Length: 47:54
- Label: Vanguard Records
- Producer: Peter Collins

Carbon Leaf chronology
Indian Summer (2004)	Love, Loss, Hope, Repeat (2006)	Nothing Rhymes with Woman (2009)

Professional ratings
Review scores
Source	Rating
Allmusic	3/5 stars

Love, Loss, Hope, Repeat is an album by the band Carbon Leaf on the Vanguard Records label. Recording for the album started in 2004 and it was released on September 12, 2006.

Note: Carbon Leaf re-recorded this album under their Constant Ivy label and called it "Love Loss Hope Repeat Reneaux" in 2015. In the re-recording, "Learn to Fly" was listed as "Dirty Bird (Learn to Fly)".

== Track listing ==
No.	Title	Length
1.	"Learn to Fly"	3:64
2.	"Love Loss Hope Repeat"	4:19
3.	"Under the Wire"	3:54
4.	"Royal One"	4:03
5.	"A Girl and Her Horse"	3:54
6.	"Texas Stars"	4:58
7.	"Block of Wood"	4:03
8.	"Comfort"	3:57
9.	"The War Was In Color"	6:15
10.	"Bright Lights"	4:08
11.	"International Airport"	4:13
Total length:		47:54

== Release week: Billboard chart performance ==
- Top New Artists Chart: 3
- Independent Chart: 12
- Internet Chart: 14
- Top Current Albums Chart: 170
