= Top of the Stairs =

Bar and restaurant in Blacksburg, Virginia

Coordinates: 37°13′47.2″N 80°25′0.2″W

The sign in front of Top of the Stairs

Top of the Stairs (popularly known as TOTS and for a period of time in the mid-1980s and early 1990s was called The Balcony) is a bar and restaurant in Blacksburg, Virginia, near the Virginia Tech campus. Established in 1978 and located at 217 West College Ave, TOTS is popular among Virginia Tech students and alumni due to its history, proximity to campus, signature mixed drink known as the Rail, and Tuesday night karaoke.

The establishment's name comes from the large staircase leading from the street to the front entrance. The side and back feature a large balcony overlooking a lower, ground-level area with a stage and secondary bar.

== Sudflood ==
Each April since 1995, the Virginia Tech chapter of Pi Kappa Phi has hosted an all-day music festival at Top of the Stairs called Sudflood.

In 2007, Sudflood was used as a benefit concert in the wake of the shootings at Virginia Tech. The bands, including Carbon Leaf and Jimmie's Chicken Shack, played for free, and Pi Kappa Phi donated the proceeds to the Hokie Spirit Memorial Fund.
