= Dustin Schuetter =

American actor, producer and director

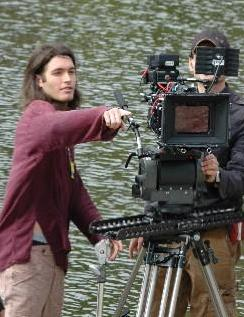
- Schuetter on the set of Dedd Brothers
- Born: 14 May 1984 (age 42); Thibodaux, Louisiana
- Occupations: Actor; producer; director; screenwriter
- Years active: 1989–Present

Dustin Schuetter (born May 14, 1984) is an American actor, producer, director and screenwriter.

== Career ==
Shortly after arriving in Los Angeles, Dustin found work with Emmy-nominated Director Gil Junger, who directed the film 10 Things I Hate About You, as well as TV series Kyle XY, Ellen and Greek. He has also worked alongside Oscar-Nominated and award-winning actress Sally Kirkland. Since that time, Schuetter has worked steadily in Hollywood, appearing in seven films and three pilots (mostly leads).

In 2009, Schuetter formed Dark Horse Pictures, with co-producer and partner Bernadette F. Dugas, which would later be changed to Aria Cinema Relic. That same year he wrote, produced, directed and played the role of Jackson Dedd in his first dark comedy Dedd Brothers. During that time, Carlucci Weyant was called in to play the role of Randy Dedd. Schuetter, Dugas and Weyant partnered up to produce his next film, Samuel Bleak.

In 2010, Schuetter went on to write, direct, produce and play the lead in his film Samuel Bleak starring Debora Kara Unger, David Zayas, Jamie Murray, Keith David, James Russo, Robert Miano, K Callan and co-producer Carlucci Weyant. Samuel Bleak premiered at Cinequest Film Festival in the historic California Theatre on March 5, 2011, showed at the Sarasota Film Festival and competed at the First Santa Catalina Film Festival in Catalina, CA. Samuel Bleak has also been nominated for the 2011 Voice Award which is sponsored by the U.S. Department of Health and Human Services, Substance Abuse and Mental Health Services Administration (SAMHSA), and Center for Mental Health Services. The Voice Awards honor leaders who have done exemplary work promoting the social inclusion of individuals with behavioral health problems.

== Filmography ==
Film
Year	Title	Role	Other
2011	Samuel Bleak	Samuel Bleak	Producer, writer, director - Cinequest, Sarasota and Santa Catalina Film Festivals
2009	Dedd Brothers	Jackson Dedd	Producer, writer, director
2008	An American in China	Kevin	
2008	Big Game	Ryan Selner	
2007	Resurrection Mary	Kevin	
1989	Margaret Bourke-White	Poor Child	

Television
Year	Title	Role	Other
2007	Greek (Pilot)	Pretty Brother	ABC Family Series

== Current ==
To date, Schuetter has penned six screenplays, three of which are in pre-production. While currently living in Los Angeles, he often travels to his home state of Louisiana to do film work at Aria Relic Studios, a film production company owned by Schuetter and Bernadette F. Dugas.

== Sources ==
1. Cinequest World Premiere
2. Thibodaux Filmmaker
3. CQ Central
4. Weyant and Schuetter Join Forces
5. Thibodaux Native Archived 2011-07-17 at the Wayback Machine
6. Directors Discuss Challenges
7. Dark Horse Productions
8. Cinequest Film Festival
9. Resurrection Mary
10. Samuel Bleak Goes Cajun
