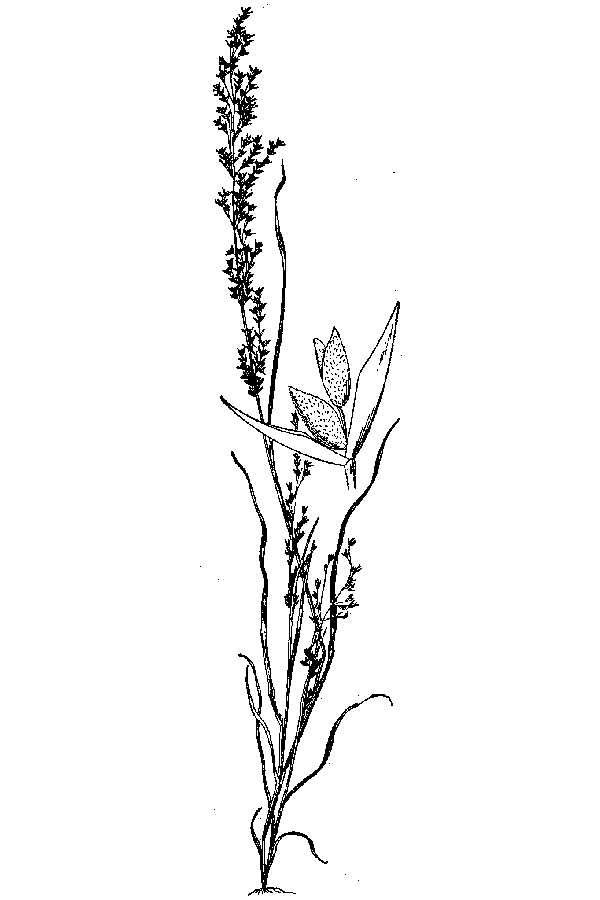
- Dissanthelium californicum

Scientific classification
- Kingdom: Plantae
- Clade: Tracheophytes
- Clade: Angiosperms
- Clade: Monocots
- Clade: Commelinids
- Order: Poales
- Family: Poaceae
- Genus: Dissanthelium; Trin.

Type species
- Dissanthelium supinum Trin.

Synonyms
- Poa sect. Dissanthelium (Trin.) Refulio; Phalaridium Nees & Meyen; Stenochloa Nutt.; Graminastrum E.H.L.Krause

= Dissanthelium =

Genus of grasses

Dissanthelium is a genus of plants in the grass family. It is native to the Americas, especially in the Andes of South America.

The only species native to the United States, D. californicum, was thought to be extinct until a single population was discovered on Santa Catalina Island, California, in 2005.

Species

- Dissanthelium amplivaginatum - Ancash in Peru
- Dissanthelium breve - Peru, Bolivia
- Dissanthelium brevifolium - Peru
- Dissanthelium californicum - California (Santa Catalina I, †San Clemente I), †Baja California (†Guadalupe I)
- Dissanthelium calycinum - Peru, Bolivia, Mexico
- Dissanthelium giganteum - Peru
- Dissanthelium laxifolium Swallen & Tovar - Peru, Bolivia
- Dissanthelium longifolium Tovar - Huánuco in Peru
- Dissanthelium longiligulatum Swallen & Tovar - La Paz in Bolivia
- Dissanthelium macusaniense (E.H.L.Krause) R.C.Foster & L.B.Sm. - Peru, Bolivia, Argentina
- Dissanthelium peruvianum - Peru, Bolivia, Argentina, Chile
- Dissanthelium pygmaeum - Huancavelica in Peru
- Dissanthelium rauhii - Peru
- Dissanthelium trollii - La Paz in Bolivia, eastern Peru

formerly included

see Poa

- Dissanthelium atropidiforme - Poa atropidiformis
- Dissanthelium patagonicum - Poa atropidiformis
