= Carbon Leaf =

American rock band

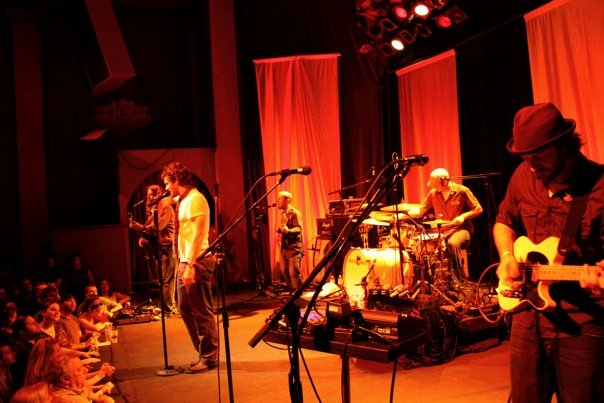
- Carbon Leaf performing live at the Bluebird Theater in Denver, CO, 2009

Background information
- Origin: Richmond, Virginia, United States
- Genres: Alternative country; folk rock; blue-grass; indie rock; Celtic; roots rock; indie folk; Americana
- Years active: 1992–present
- Labels: Constant Ivy Music, Vanguard
- Members: Barry Privett; Terry Clark; Carter Gravatt; Jon Markel; Jesse Humphrey
- Past members: Palmer Stearns; Devin Maguire; Brian Durrett; Scott Milstead; Jordan Medas; Jason Neal
- Website: www.carbonleaf.com

Carbon Leaf is an American musical quintet from Richmond, Virginia, known for their alt-country, Celtic and folk-infused indie rock. Though some of the band members have changed through the years, Carbon Leaf has been consistently creating and performing music since the early 1990s. The band currently consists of founding members Barry Privett, Carter Gravatt, and Terry Clark, as well as Jon Markel and Jesse Humphrey. Carbon Leaf is best known for the song "Life Less Ordinary", which debuted in 2004 and reached number five on Billboard's Adult Alternative charts.

== History ==
=== 1992–2004: The Constant Ivy Music years ===
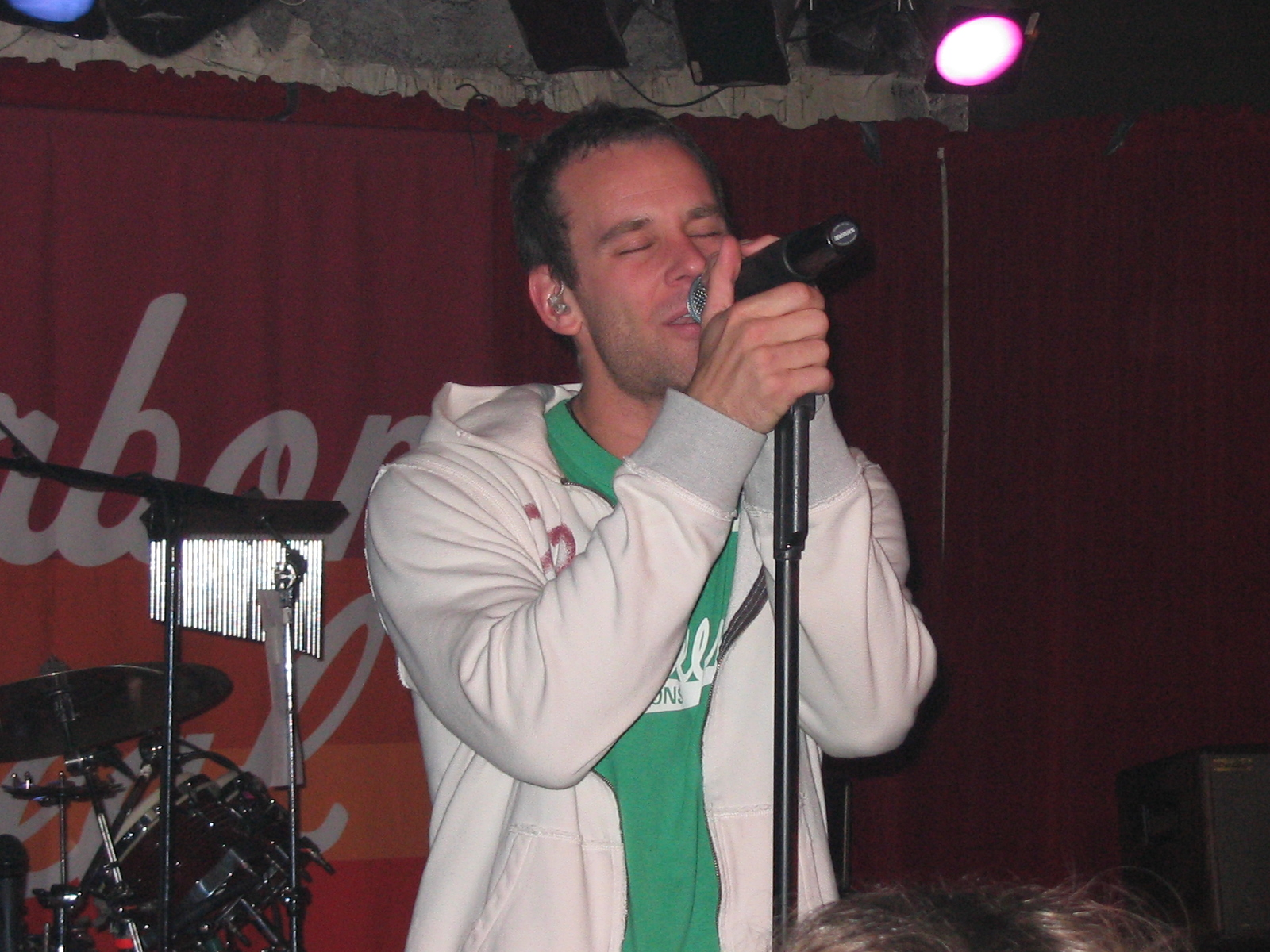
Barry Privett

Carbon Leaf got their start at Randolph-Macon College in Virginia in 1992, practicing in an auditorium on campus. Their next step was playing backyard parties, mixers, fraternity, and sorority parties. Shortly after everyone graduated, they moved to Richmond, Virginia. From Richmond, they played the college circuit in Virginia and up the East Coast before moving on to clubs. Their style is not "Brazilian Polka Metal", despite the joking claims of guitarist Carter Gravatt (B., David. 2002).

Meander, their first album, was released in 1995. The first songs Carbon Leaf wrote, including "One Day" and "Country Monkee", are on the album.

Shadows in the Banquet Hall, released in 1997, includes "Flood", "Wolftrap and Fireflies", and "Attica's Flower Box Window". An award-winning video was made for "Flood".

Ether~Electrified Porch Music (1999) is the first album with Jordan Medas as the bassist and contains "Home", "American Tale", and "Blue Ridge Laughing". The band had sold over 10,000 copies of their first three independent CDs by late 1999, released on their own label, Constant Ivy Music.

Echo Echo was released in 2001 with "The Boxer" as the first track. In January 2002, Carbon Leaf won the first-ever American Music Awards Presents the Coca-Cola New Music Award for "The Boxer". As part of winning they performed "The Boxer" live on the AMAs, becoming the first unsigned band to perform at the awards show. Following this appearance, "The Boxer" entered regular rotation on radio stations including Washington, DC's DC101 (WWDC 101.1 FM). In May 2002, the band members gave up their day jobs in order to dedicate more time to the band and touring. The hidden bonus track "Dear" from their Echo Echo CD was originally written to play over the closing credits and on the soundtrack of the Kevin Hershberger civil war film Wicked Spring. Barry Privett also appeared in the film. In September 2002, Carbon Leaf won the Pontiac Vibe Summer Sound Off resulting in "The Boxer" being played in Pontiac Vibe commercials on MTV and VH1.

In January 2003, Carbon Leaf gave permission for fan-made recordings of their concerts to be included in the Live Music Archive, a part of the Internet Archive. Various concerts are available from 2000 to present in lossless formats SHN or FLAC and the lossy format VBR MP3, with the majority coming from the years 2002–2004. 5 Alive!, Carbon Leaf's first live album, was released in the summer of 2003. The album was recorded over five concerts during the autumn and winter of 2002 and its track list is assembled to match a concert playlist.

=== 2004–2010: The Vanguard Records years ===
In Spring 2004, Carbon Leaf signed with Vanguard Records, part of the Welk Music Group and in July of that year released their album, Indian Summer. "Life Less Ordinary" rose to number 5 on the Adult Album Alternative charts and 29 on the Hot AC Charts. Carbon Leaf performed "Life Less Ordinary" on the November 30, 2004 episode of The Dr. Phil Show. "What About Everything?" rose to 25 on the AAA charts. Indian Summer has been ranked in the top 10 by KMTT in Seattle, and number 40 out of the Top 50 Albums of 2004 by WXPN in Philadelphia. The album was produced by John Morand and David Lowery. The video for "Life Less Ordinary" debuted on January 5, 2005.

In June 2006, an interview with Carbon Leaf guitarist Terry Clark was chosen as the cover feature for the inaugural issue of The Green Room magazine. On September 12, 2006, the band released Love, Loss, Hope, Repeat. According to their blog, it was recorded in Nashville, Tennessee, and mixed in collaboration with producer Peter Collins and Trina Shoemaker. The title track was featured in the October 30, 2006, episode of ABC's What About Brian. Tom McCormack began touring with Carbon Leaf, playing keys and accordion. The video for "Learn to Fly" featured Katy Perry as "a besotted fan rushing to attend a Carbon Leaf performance".

Carbon Leaf played at Sudflood 2007, and dedicated their performance to the memory of the lives lost in the Virginia Tech shootings. All proceeds went towards the memorial fund for the victims and their families.

In August 2007, Scott Milstead was replaced by Jason Neal on drums. In August 2008, Jordan Medas left the band to pursue a teaching career. He was replaced in October 2008 by Jon Markel.

The band released their seventh studio album, Nothing Rhymes with Woman, on May 19, 2009. On June 30, 2009, Carbon Leaf was the featured band at Red Rocks' Film On The Rocks.

The producers of Curious George 2: Follow That Monkey! were using an acoustic version of "Life Less Ordinary" as a placeholder in the film. The request to license it snowballed into wanting to license additional songs and ultimately a request that Carbon Leaf do the majority of the soundtrack. Carbon Leaf contributed six songs to the soundtrack for the animated film, including versions of "Life Less Ordinary" and "Let Your Troubles Roll By" with new alternate lyrics (in the second verse) and "The Friendship Song". The soundtrack and the direct-to-DVD movie were released on March 2, 2010.

Carbon Leaf has played with many acts, including Dave Matthews Band, Something Corporate, O.A.R., and David Gray, and has toured with Jason Mraz, Blues Traveler, Great Big Sea, Jump, Little Children, Matt Nathanson, Big Head Todd and the Monsters, The Avett Brothers, Guster, and Stephen Kellogg and the Sixers.

In January 2006, Carbon Leaf was one of the bands to join Sister Hazel's floating Music festival The Rock Boat. They have also performed on The Rock Boat 2007, Ships & Dip hosted by The Barenaked Ladies in 2008, The Rock Boat in 2009, 2010, 2012, 2013, and 2017.

=== 2010–present: Return to indie status ===
In March 2010, the band announced that they were amicably parting ways with their label, Vanguard Records, intending to record and release music on their own schedule and distribute it over the internet. Their plan was to market their music by giving it away at shows, a strategy not compatible with Vanguard's focus on CD sales.

On July 6, 2010, they released How the West was One, inspired by and written during their tour of the American West, initially on their website and subsequently on iTunes and Amazon.com. Their ninth studio album and third of 2010, a collection of original Christmas- and winter-themed songs titled Christmas Child, was released on November 16. Barry Privett described the songs as "encompassing both the joy and melancholy of the season."

A second live album and DVD was recorded in January 2010 and released as a three-disc set in early 2011. Live, Acoustic...And In Cinemascope! was released on May 3, 2011.

In February 2013, the band released Ghost Dragon Attacks Castle.

Carbon Leaf launched a crowdfunding effort on in June 2013 to support their next studio album. Entitled Constellation Prize, the album was released digitally through their website and on CD.

On August 9, 2014, Carbon Leaf released Indian Summer Revisited, a tenth-anniversary re-recording of their 2004 album. As with their previous album, it was supported via a crowdfunding campaign on PledgeMusic. They repeated this tactic with their album Love, Loss, Hope, Repeat in 2015 and Nothing Rhymes with Woman in 2016. While the band does not own the master recordings from the 2004 album they do own the songs. Doing these remasters allowed the band to sell the albums independently.

In 2018, the band's 25th anniversary year, Carbon Leaf released a five song album, Gathering: vol. 1 which was their first release of new songs since 2013.

Carbon Leaf followed up with another five song EP titled Gathering Vol. 2: The Hunting Ground in September 2021.

In September 2024, Carbon Leaf released its first full new album in a decade, Time is the Playground.

== Band members ==
- Barry Privett: lead vocals, penny whistle, acoustic guitar, bagpipes (1992–present)
- Terry Clark: electric guitar, acoustic guitar, vocals (1992–present)
- Carter Gravatt: acoustic, electric mandolin, acoustic guitar, electric guitar, 12 string guitar, lap steel, bouzouki, bodhran, loops, effects, vocals, violin/fiddle, hurdy-gurdy (1992–present)
- Jon Markel: electric bass, upright bass, vocals (2008–present)
- Jesse Humphrey: drums, percussion, guitar, vocals (2017–present)

=== Former band members ===
- Palmer Stearns: bass
- Devin Maguire: bass
- Scott Milstead: drums, percussion, vocals
- Brian Durrett: bass
- Jordan Medas: electric bass, bowed and double bass, vocals
- Jason Neal: drums, percussion

== Discography ==
=== Studio albums and EPs ===
Year	Album details	Peak positions				
Year	Album details	US	US Rock	US Heat	US Indie	US Internet
1995	Meander: Released: January 1, 1995; Label: Constant Ivy Music	—	—	—	—	—
1997	Shadows in the Banquet Hall: Released: October 1, 1997; Label: Constant Ivy Music	—	—	—	—	—
1999	Ether~Electrified Porch Music: Released: November 1, 1999; Label: Constant Ivy Music	—	—	—	—	—
2001	Echo Echo: Released: March 31, 2001; Label: Constant Ivy Music	—	—	—	—	—
2004	Indian Summer: Released: July 13, 2004; Label: Vanguard Records	—	—	—	53	12
2006	Love, Loss, Hope, Repeat: Released: September 12, 2006; Label: Vanguard Records	170	—	3	12	12
2009	Nothing Rhymes with Woman: Released: May 19, 2009; Label: Vanguard Records	136	41	3	—	—
2010	How the West was One: Released: July 6, 2010; Label: Constant Ivy Music	—	—	—	—	—
2010	‘’Curious George 2: Follow That Monkey!’’: Released: March 2, 2010; Label: 429 Records	—	—	—	—	—
2010	Christmas Child: Released: November 16, 2010; Label: Constant Ivy Music	—	—	—	—	—
2013	Ghost Dragon Attacks Castle: Released: February 19, 2013; Label: Constant Ivy Music	—	—	—	—	—
2013	Constellation Prize: Released: October 1, 2013; Label: Constant Ivy Music	—	—	—	—	—
2014	Indian Summer Revisited: Released: August 9, 2014; Label: Constant Ivy Music	—	—	—	—	—
2015	Love Loss Hope Repeat Reneaux: Released: July 31, 2015; Label: Constant Ivy Music	—	—	—	—	—
2016	Nothing Rhymes with Woman: Released: December 6, 2016; Label: Constant Ivy Music	—	—	—	—	—
2018	Gathering: Volume 1: Released: June 1, 2018; Label: Constant Ivy Music	—	—	—	—	—
2021	Gathering Vol. 2: The Hunting Ground: Released: September 24, 2021; Label: Constant Ivy Music	—	—	—	—	—
2024	Time Is the Playground: Released: September 27, 2024; Label: Constant Ivy Music	—	—	—	—	—
"—" denotes releases that did not chart

=== Live albums ===
Year	Album details	Peak positions			
Year	Album details	US	US Rock	US Heat	US Indie
2003	5 Alive!: Released: August 12, 2003; Label: Constant Ivy Music	—	—	—	—
2011	Live, Acoustic...And In Cinemascope!: Released: May 3, 2011; Label: Constant Ivy Music	—	—	—	—
"—" denotes releases that did not chart

=== Singles ===
Year	Title	Label	Peak positions		
Year	Title	Label	US AAA	US Adult Contemporary	US Adult Top 40
2001	"I Know The Reason"	Constant Ivy Music	—	—	—
2001	"The Boxer"	Constant Ivy Music	—	—	—
2004	"Life Less Ordinary"	Vanguard Records	5	29	30
2005	"What About Everything"	Vanguard Records	25	—	—
2005	"Let Your Troubles Roll By"	Vanguard Records	—	—	—
2006	"Learn to Fly"	Vanguard Records	—	—	—
2007	"Comfort"	Vanguard Records	—	—	—
2009	"Miss Hollywood"	Vanguard Records	33	—	—

=== Music videos ===
Year	Video
2006	"Learn to Fly"

== Awards ==
- 2000 – First Place, Unsigned Music Video, Internet Underground Music Archive, IUMA(for "Flood")
- 2002 – First ever American Music Awards Presents the Coca-Cola New Music Award for 2001
- 2002 – First Place, Rock Category, International Songwriting Competition (for "The Boxer")
- 2002 – Pontiac Vibe Summer Sound Off Campaign Winner (for "The Boxer")
- 2007 – Second Place Overall, First Place Lyrics, 2007 USA Songwriting Competition (for "The War Was In Color"),
