= Constellation Prize (album) =

Studio album by Carbon Leaf
- Released: October 1, 2013
- Genre: adult album alternative
- Length: 45:40
- Label: Constant Ivy Music

Carbon Leaf chronology
Ghost Dragon Attacks Castle (2013)	Constellation Prize (2013)	Indian Summer Revisited (2014)

Constellation Prize is the ninth studio album by the band Carbon Leaf and was released on their own label, Constant Ivy Music.

== Track listing ==
All tracks are written by Carbon Leaf

No.	Title	Length
1.	"Circus"	3:56
2.	"Love Rain Down"	3:22
3.	"Alcatraz"	4:46
4.	"All of My Love"	6:09
5.	"Two Aging Truckers"	4:10
6.	"Ragtime Carnival"	3:52
7.	"Sparklers"	4:27
8.	"Pierce My Heart"	5:50
9.	"Wolfin Down Your Heart"	4:27
10.	"Tombstone vs. Ashes"	4:41
Total length:		45:40
