= Catalina Island Conservancy =

US nonprofit organization

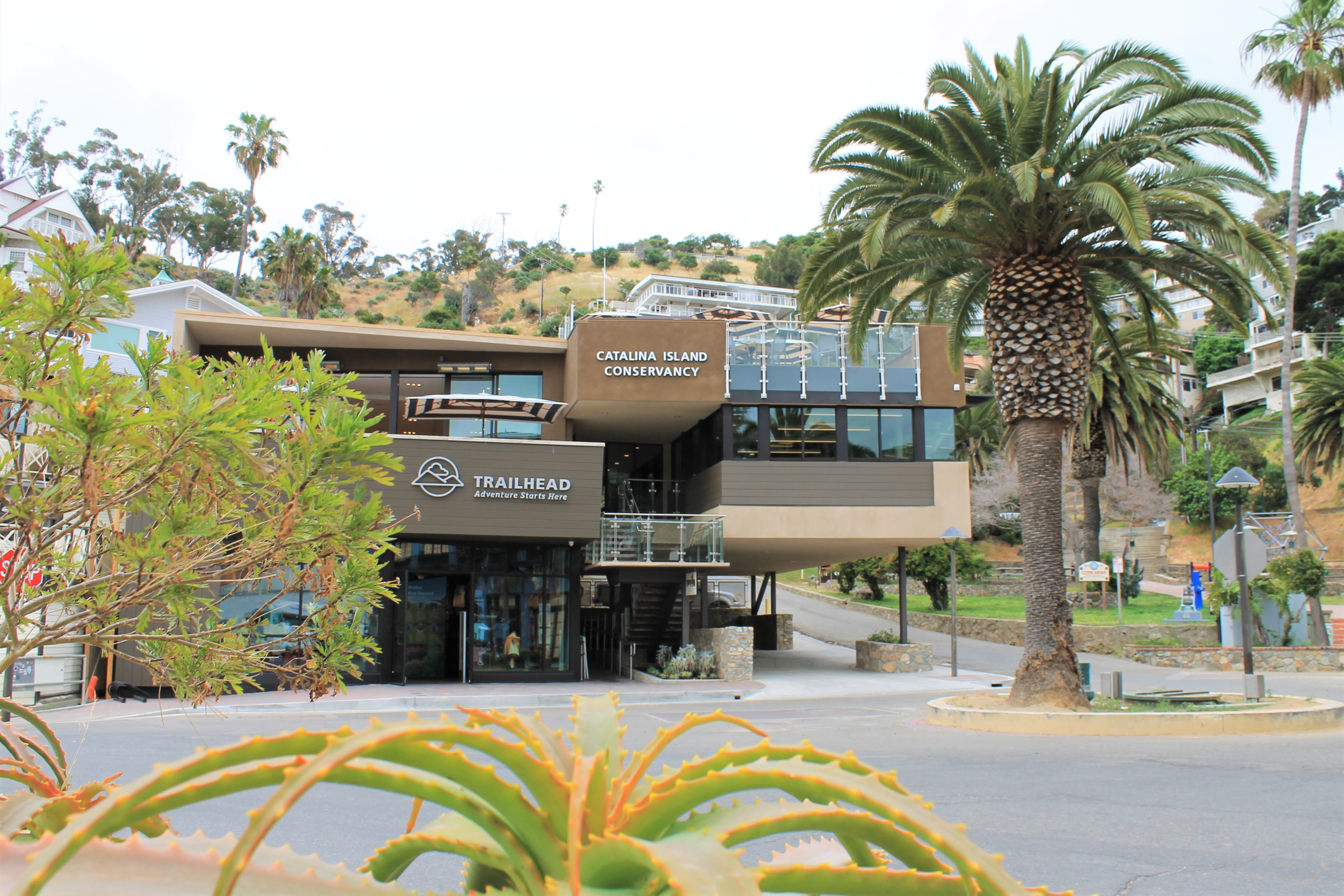
Catalina Island Conservancy's location, the Trailhead, at 708 Crescent Ave. in Avalon on Catalina Island

The Catalina Island Conservancy is a nonprofit organization established to protect and restore Santa Catalina Island, California, United States. The Conservancy was established in 1972 through the efforts of the Wrigley and Offield families. The Conservancy was created when both families deeded 42,135 acres (170.51 km^{2}) of the island over to the organization—88% of the Island.

Founded in 1972, the Conservancy is one of the oldest private land trusts in Southern California. The stated goal of the Conservancy is to "be a responsible steward of our lands through a balance of conservation, education and recreation."

In April 2019, the Conservancy opened a new base of operations, the Trailhead, at 708 Crescent Ave in the city of Avalon on Catalina Island. It is the first LEED Gold certified building in Avalon. In addition to providing information about recreation opportunities on the Island, hiking and biking permits, and serving as the launch point for Conservancy Eco Tours and Wildlands Express shuttles, the Trailhead has educational exhibits and a shop. The second floor of the Trailhead features a plein air exhibit and a restaurant. The third floor includes a native plant garden featuring several Catalina native or endemic species.

== Conservation ==
Established to protect and restore Catalina, the Conservancy seeks a balance between conservation and public interest. Catalina's native plant community is central to the ecosystem of the island, providing habitats that offer shelter and food to the island's endemic and native animals like the Catalina Island fox, Catalina quail, and bald eagles among many other species. But years of importing non-native plants to feed grazing animals and landscape homes, has introduced to Catalina more than 76 highly invasive plant species.

=== Invasive plants ===
Due to so many efforts in the past to capitalize on the island, many invasive flora and fauna were introduced. The Conservancy removes invasive plants to protect and restore the island. The Conservancy's Catalina Habitat Improvement and Restoration Program (CHIRP) is designed to ensure long-term conservation of species richness and habitat integrity in one of the world's biodiversity hot spots. Three species of highly invasive plants have been nearly eradicated from the island: tamarisk, pampas grass and fig. CHIRP has targeted 27 other species for eradication and another 36 to be managed to limit their presence on the Island.

By eliminating and managing invasive plant species, the CHIRP program has encouraged native species to grow and flourish. It contributed to the discovery of new species and the rediscovery of species following years of fear that they were extinct. Among those rediscovered are Catalina grass and Lyon's pygmy daisy, which had previously not been seen for 80 years. The James P. Ackerman Native Plant Nursery at Middle Ranch provides plant and seed material for re-vegetation of the island.

The Conservancy also operates the Stop the Spread program, a partnership between the Conservancy's naturalists, CHIRP staff and the many youth camps on the island. The program is focused on invasive plant control in and around each camp. Campers are taught about the value of native species, the problems posed by invasive species and how to help eradicate invasive species. Campers also learn how to restore and improve native environments. Stop the Spread has given nearly 15,000 campers tens of thousands of hours of education from 2009 to 2013. Campers manage about 450 acres for 75 different invasive species, logging more than 7,000 hours of invasive plant removal a year.

=== Animals ===
The Catalina Island fox is found on Catalina Island and nowhere else in the world. An adult fox weighs 4 to 6 pounds (1.8 to 2.7 kg) and is about 25% smaller than its mainland ancestor, the gray fox. Its diet includes mice, lizards, birds, berries, insects, and cactus fruit. It is Catalina's largest terrestrial predator.

In late 1999, an outbreak of distemper virus caused the fox population to plummet from about 1,300 to just 100 animals. In 2000, the Catalina Island Conservancy and its partner, the Institute for Wildlife Studies, implemented the Catalina Island Fox Recovery Plan. The plan combined relocation, vaccinations, captive breeding and release, and wild fox population monitoring.

Due to this outbreak The US Fish and Wildlife Service declared the Catalina Island fox an endangered sub-species in 2004. After 15 years of work by wildlife biologists, the Conservancy announced that the Catalina Island adult fox population had rebounded to pre-crash numbers. The Conservancy's biologists counted 1,850 foxes on the island, 350 more than the year before, in one of the fastest recoveries ever of an endangered species.

The Conservancy has worked with the Institute for Wildlife Studies in a successful program that brought bald eagles back to Catalina and the other Channel Islands after DDT contamination decimated their numbers.

=== Bison ===
The Conservancy is also actively managing a herd of bison on the island with a novel contraceptive program that is attracting the attention of wild animal managers on the mainland. The bison were first brought to the island in 1924 for a movie. Over the years, they became an iconic symbol of the island's culture. But with no natural predators, the herd grew to as many as 500. The Conservancy had previously conducted studies that found the island could support only about 150 to 200 bison. To control the herd's size, the Conservancy had been periodically conducting roundups and shipping bison to the mainland.

Shipping the bison to the mainland was costly, and it raised concerns about the stress on the animals during shipment and the expansion of the herd beyond ecologically sustainable numbers between shipments. Beginning in 2009, the Conservancy's scientists injected the female bison with porcine zona pellucida (PZP), a contraceptive that had been used for fertility control in zoos, wild horses and white tail deer. In addition to substantially reducing the number of new calves, the PZP had no apparent effect on pregnant females or their offspring. A peer-reviewed study published in 2013 reported that the contraceptive program was effective in controlling the herd. Previously, more than two-thirds of the cows delivered calves every year. After receiving the contraceptive, the calving rate dropped to 10.4% in the first year and 3.3% the following year.

The Conservancy's scientists, and their collaborators at California State University, Fullerton, continue to study PZP to determine if the female bison can regain their fertility after a period of time without the contraceptive. They are also evaluating the timing of ovulation in response to PZP application. After several years without bison births on the island, Catalina Island Conservancy had plans to bring two pregnant bison to Catalina at the end of 2020.

=== Deer ===
The deer are an invasive species, and they have a significant impact on native plants due to over-grazing. In 2023, the Conservancy created a plan to reduce the impact that invasive deer have on native vegetation. After consulting with wildlife experts, capturing and sterilization were eliminated as options, and a culling (killing from helicopters) approach was adopted. Some residents of Santa Catalina Island were opposed to the cull, and asked the Conservancy to reconsider.

== Education ==
Each year, more than 100,000 children and adults learn about the uniqueness of Catalina's Mediterranean ecosystem and what they can do to improve the planet through the Conservancy's educational programs and a wide variety of youth camps the Conservancy hosts on its lands. Among the educational programs it offers are:

- The Naturalist Training Program provides those working in the island's hospitality industry with in-depth environmental and conservation information.
- Through the Families in Nature program, island residents can take free trips into the wildlands led by Conservancy-trained naturalists.
- The Conservancy's Kids in Nature after-school program educates children about the island and the environment through hikes and other outdoor experiences.
- The ISLAND Program for K-5 students and the Island Scholars Program provide nature-based field experiences to young people.
- The Conservancy's Rose Ellen Gardner Internship is helping train the next generation of island leaders.

The Nature Centers at the Airport in the Sky and Avalon Canyon showcase the island's natural history and the Conservancy's restoration accomplishments. The Conservancy operates the airport as well, which is located about 10 miles from Avalon. It also operates the Explore Store in its headquarters at Conservancy House, 125 Clarissa Ave., Avalon.

The nature centers' exhibits focus on the island's natural history, including its animals, plants, geology and marine life, and the conservation efforts led by the Conservancy. The Wrigley Memorial & Botanic Garden offers visitors a living exhibition of the plant life on the island. The Conservancy cares for such endemics as the Catalina liveforever, Catalina manzanita and Catalina Island bedstraw at its Ackerman Native Plant Nursery at Middle Ranch in the island's center.

The Conservancy offers several other publications and productions for the public, including the biannual Conservancy Times magazine; monthly Conservancy News e-newsletter and an Annual Report.

== Recreation ==
The Catalina Island Conservancy offers 50 miles of biking trails and nearly 150 miles of hiking opportunities within its road and trails system, including the Trans-Catalina Trail, which stretches 38.5 miles from the Catalina Island Conservancy's visitors' center, the Trailhead in Avalon on the East End, to Parson's Landing on the West End. It then loops back to Two Harbors. Other recreational offerings include:

- Running: Numerous endurance events throughout the year including the Eco-Marathon and the Catalina Marathon
- Camping: Five campgrounds and nine boat-in campsites
- Flying: 7,500 landings a year at the Airport in the Sky
- Volunteer Vacations: Volunteers help the Conservancy and get to see parts of the Island rarely seen by guests

The Conservancy operates annual events including the Conservancy Ball and Catalina: The Wild Side Art Show & Sale.

The Catalina Island Conservancy operates out of offices in Avalon and Middle Ranch on the island and in Long Beach, California, on the mainland. It has a staff of 75 and is aided by a donor base and a volunteer force that contributes 25,000 man-hours per year.
