= Minions: The Rise of Gru (soundtrack) =

2022 soundtrack album

Minions: The Rise of Gru (Original Motion Picture Soundtrack)

Soundtrack album by various artists
- Released: July 1, 2022
- Recorded: 2020–2022
- Genres: Pop; funk; soul
- Length: 58:07
- Label: Decca
- Producers: Jack Antonoff; Mikey Freedom Hart; St. Vincent; Heitor Pereira

Heitor Pereira chronology
The Valet (2022)	Minions: The Rise of Gru (2022)	Puss in Boots: The Last Wish (2022)

Singles from Minions: The Rise of Gru (Original Motion Picture Soundtrack)
- 1. "Turn Up the Sunshine" Released: May 20, 2022; 2. "Desafinado" Released: May 27, 2022; 3. "Funkytown" Released: June 3, 2022; 4. "Hollywood Swinging" Released: June 17, 2022; 5. "Dance to the Music" Released: June 24, 2022

Professional ratings
Review scores
Source	Rating
Pitchfork	6.0/10

Minions: The Rise of Gru (Original Motion Picture Soundtrack) is the soundtrack album for the film of the same name, released on July 1, 2022, through Decca Records. The Jack Antonoff-produced soundtrack consists of various contemporary artists covering famous funk, pop, and soul hits of the 1970s. "Turn Up the Sunshine" by Diana Ross and Tame Impala was released as the album's lead single on May 20, 2022. Four more singles followed, "Desafinado" by Kali Uchis, "Funkytown" by St. Vincent, "Hollywood Swinging" by Brockhampton, and "Dance to the Music" by H.E.R. A score soundtrack from composer Heitor Pereira was released on July 8 before the film's release.

== Track listing ==
All tracks produced by Jack Antonoff, except track 2 (produced by Antonoff and Mikey Freedom Hart), track 3 (produced by Antonoff and St. Vincent), track 18 produced by RZA and track 19 (produced by Heitor Pereira).

Minions: The Rise of Gru (Original Motion Picture Soundtrack) track listing
No.	Title	Writer(s)	Artist(s)	Length
1.	"Turn Up the Sunshine"	Jack Antonoff; Patrik Berger; Sam Dew; Kevin Parker	Diana Ross featuring Tame Impala	3:50
2.	"Shining Star"	Maurice White; Larry Dunn; Philip Bailey	Brittany Howard featuring Verdine White	2:52
3.	"Funkytown"	Steve Greenberg	St. Vincent	4:23
4.	"Hollywood Swinging"	Robert "Kool" Bell; Ronald Bell; George M. Brown; Robert "Spike" Mickens; Claydes Charles Smith; Dennis R. Thomas; Rick A. Westfield	Brockhampton	2:30
5.	"Desafinado"	Newton Ferreira de Mendonça; Jon Hendricks; Jesse Cavanagh; Antônio Carlos Jobim	Kali Uchis	2:10
6.	"Bang Bang"	Sonny Bono	Caroline Polachek	2:19
7.	"Fly Like an Eagle"	Steve Miller	Thundercat	2:58
8.	"Goodbye to Love"	Richard Carpenter; John Bettis	Phoebe Bridgers	4:02
9.	"Instant Karma!"	John Lennon	Bleachers	3:41
10.	"You're No Good"	Clint Ballard Jr.	Weyes Blood	3:36
11.	"Vehicle"	Jim Peterik; Gary Clark Jr.	Gary Clark Jr.	2:55
12.	"Dance to the Music"	Antonoff; Sly Stone; H.E.R.	H.E.R.	2:43
13.	"Black Magic Woman"	Peter Green	Tierra Whack	4:09
14.	"Cool"	Antonoff; Dew; Mikey Freedom Hart; Sean Hutchinson; Verdine White	Verdine White	2:54
15.	"Born to Be Alive"	Patrick Hernandez	Jackson Wang	3:12
16.	"Cecilia"	Paul Simon	Pierre Coffin as the Minions	2:14
17.	"Bang Bang"	Bono	G.E.M.	2:18
18.	"Kung Fu Suite"	RZA	RZA	1:32
19.	"Minions: Rise of Gru Score Suite"	Heitor Pereira	Pereira	3:50
Total length:				58:07

== Personnel ==
=== Musicians ===
- Jack Antonoff – guitar (tracks 1–4, 6, 12), drums (tracks 1–6, 9, 12), sound effects (tracks 1–4), bass (tracks 1–2, 4, 6, 9, 12), keyboards (tracks 1–2, 4), percussion (tracks 1, 3–6, 9, 12), mellotron (tracks 5, 12), lead vocals (track 9), acoustic guitar (track 9), piano (track 9), electric guitar (track 9), background vocals (track 12), Wurlitzer electric piano (track 12), clavichord (track 12)
- Phoebe Bridgers – lead vocals (track 8)
- Matt Champion – vocals (track 4)
- Gary Clark Jr. – lead vocals (track 11)
- Pierre Coffin – lead vocals (track 16)
- Sam Dew – background vocals (tracks 1, 12, 14)
- Joba – vocals (track 4)
- Cole Kamen-Green – tuba (track 2), trumpet (track 2)
- Chris Kasych – electric guitar (track 6), keyboards (track 6)
- Kevin Abstract – vocals (track 4)
- G.E.M. – lead vocals (track 17)
- Mikey Freedom Hart – guitar (tracks 2, 5), Wurlitzer electric piano (track 2), Rhodes piano (track 2), keyboards (track 3), percussion (track 5), nylon string guitar (track 5), synthesizer programming (track 5), Hammond organ (track 5), bass (track 9), piano (track 9), organ (track 12)
- Bobby Hawk – violin (tracks 1, 3)
- H.E.R. – lead vocals (track 12), guitar (track 12)
- Brittany Howard – lead vocals (track 2)
- Sean Hutchinson – drums (track 1)
- Dom McLennon – vocals (track 4)
- Kevin Parker – lead vocals (track 1), guitar (track 1), bass (track 1), keyboards (track 1), percussion (track 1)
- Caroline Polachek – lead vocals (track 6)
- Michael Riddleberger – drums (track 1), percussion (track 1)
- Diana Ross – lead vocals (track 1)
- RZA – lead vocals (track 18)
- Alfie Silbert – clapping (track 4)
- Evan Smith – background vocals (track 1), saxophone (tracks 1, 3), flute (tracks 1, 5), keyboards (tracks 2–4, 6), horn (tracks 2, 4–6, 12), guitar (track 4), sound effects (track 4), piano (track 6)
- St. Vincent – lead vocals (track 3), guitar (track 3), bass (track 3), sitar (track 3), vocal programming (track 3)
- Thundercat – lead vocals (track 7)
- Jackson Wang – lead vocals (track 15)
- Weyes Blood – lead vocals (track 10)
- Tierra Whack – lead vocals (track 13)
- Verdine White – bass (tracks 1–2)

=== Technical ===
- Jack Antonoff – producer (tracks 1–18), recording engineer (tracks 1–5, 9, 12)
- Chris Gehringer – mastering engineer (tracks 1–6, 9, 12)
- Mikey Freedom Hart – additional producer (track 2)
- Bobby Hawk – string arranger (track 9)
- Romil Hemnani – recording engineer (track 4)
- Chris Kasych - recording engineer (tracks 1–2), mixing engineer (tracks 3–6, 9, 12)
- Kevin Parker – recording engineer (track 1)
- Heitor Pereira – producer (track 19)
- Henry Mancini & Johnny Mercer (Darling Lili) track 22
- Brian Rajaratnam – recording engineer (track 6)
- John Rooney – assistant recording engineer (tracks 1–5, 12), recording engineer (track 9)
- Jon Sher – assistant recording engineer (tracks 1–5, 12), recording engineer (track 9)
- Laura Sisk – recording engineer (tracks 1–5, 9, 12), mixing engineer (track 2)
- Mark "Spike" Stent – mixing engineer (track 1)
- St. Vincent – producer (track 3), recording engineer (track 3)
- Matt Wolach – assistant mixing engineer (track 1)

== Charts ==
Chart performance for Minions: The Rise of Gru (Original Motion Picture Soundtrack)
Chart (2022)	Peak position
Australian Digital Albums (ARIA)	40
Australian Physical Albums (ARIA)	49
US Billboard 200	192
US Soundtracks	8
