= Despicable Me 4 (soundtrack) =

Despicable Me 4 (Original Motion Picture Soundtrack)

Soundtrack album by Heitor Pereira
- Released: June 27, 2024
- Recorded: 2024
- Genres: Film score; film soundtrack
- Length: 73:58
- Label: Back Lot Music
- Producer: Heitor Pereira

Heitor Pereira chronology
| Puss in Boots: The Last Wish (2022) | Despicable Me 4 (Original Motion Picture Soundtrack) (2024) | Animal Farm (2025) |

Despicable Me 4 (Original Motion Picture Soundtrack) is the soundtrack accompanying the 2024 Illumination-produced animation film Despicable Me 4, the fourth main and the sixth overall installment in the Despicable Me franchise and a sequel to Despicable Me 3 (2017). Released through Back Lot Music on June 27, 2024, it featured 44 tracks, primarily based on the film's original score composed by Heitor Pereira and the cover of Tears for Fears' 1985 single "Everybody Wants to Rule the World" performed by the film's cast.

== Background ==
Heitor Pereira and Pharrell Williams renewed their association with Despicable Me 4 as composers; the former would score the original music and the latter would provide new songs and themes, while reusing his themes from the predecessors.

== Additional music ==
Despicable Me 4 featured three original songs written and recorded specifically for the film. In May 2024, Williams previewed the snippet of the song "Double Life" through his YouTube channel. He later released it as a single on June 14, 2024. The song was interpreted by critics as a diss track aimed at Canadian rapper Drake. The second single "Lil Mega Minion" by Lil Yachty was released on June 24, 2024, followed by the third song "None of Your Business" by Teezo Touchdown, two days later. The fourth song,"Who We R",by The Dead Professors,However, those tracks were not released along with the soundtrack album.

The following songs were heard in the film, but not included in the soundtrack or separately released. Those include:

- "Despicable Me" – Pharrell Williams
- "Word Up" – Cameo
- "Unbelievable" – EMF
- "Hot For Teacher" – Van Halen
- "Freedom" – Pitbull
- "Boombayah" – Blackpink
- "I'm Too Sexy" – Right Said Fred
- "Cold Heart (Pnau Remix)" – Elton John and Dua Lipa
- "Dynamite" – BTS
- "Gonna Die Alone" – Hanni El Khatib
- "Karma Chameleon" – Culture Club
- "Main Title (Terminator 2 Theme)" – Brad Fiedel
- "Through The Fire And Flames" – DragonForce
- "Everybody Wants to Rule the World" – Tears for Fears

== Reception ==
Lovia Gyarkye of The Hollywood Reporter called the music as "tense". Gary Goldstein Los Angeles Times wrote "Heitor Pereira returns to provide the film’s effective, at times eclectic score."

== Track listing ==
Despicable Me 4 (Original Motion Picture Soundtrack) track listing
| No. | Title | Artist | Length |
|---|---|---|---|
| 1. | "Nighttime Arrival" | | 0:51 |
| 2. | "A Reunion of Rivals" | | 3:57 |
| 3. | "The Gru House" | | 2:20 |
| 4. | "A Message from Maxime" | | 0:52 |
| 5. | "Time to Leave" | | 1:04 |
| 6. | "Debrief" | | 0:33 |
| 7. | "Karl's Bus" | | 0:34 |
| 8. | "Arrival in Mayflower" | | 0:53 |
| 9. | "New Identities" | | 3:35 |
| 10. | "Maxime's Roach Army" | | 1:36 |
| 11. | "High-Stakes Pretending" | | 1:43 |
| 12. | "Meeting the Neighbors" | | 2:20 |
| 13. | "AVL's Newest Recruits" | | 0:43 |
| 14. | "We Need Volunteers" | | 0:34 |
| 15. | "The Megaminions" | | 0:54 |
| 16. | "Karate Class" | | 1:55 |
| 17. | "Secret Technique" | | 0:57 |
| 18. | "Little Cucarachas" | | 1:16 |
| 19. | "Balloons" | | 0:53 |
| 20. | "Blackmail" | | 1:40 |
| 21. | "Break Room" | | 1:41 |
| 22. | "Tennis Guy" | | 1:44 |
| 23. | "I Won't Let Gru Win" | | 1:11 |
| 24. | "Gas Station" | | 2:08 |
| 25. | "The Supermarket" | | 1:54 |
| 26. | "Trampoline" | | 0:43 |
| 27. | "Poppy's Plan" | | 1:51 |
| 28. | "The Megaminions Try Good Deeds" | | 3:06 |
| 29. | "Arrival at Lycée Pas Bon" | | 0:46 |
| 30. | "Honey Badger Heist" | | 7:25 |
| 31. | "Up to No Good" | | 0:54 |
| 32. | "We Got Him" | | 0:37 |
| 33. | "Parents' Playdate" | | 0:54 |
| 34. | "A Couple of Pros" | | 1:52 |
| 35. | "Ubelschlect at the Door" | | 1:05 |
| 36. | "Our Cover Is Blown" | | 0:28 |
| 37. | "Call the AVL" | | 0:52 |
| 38. | "Megaminions Assemble" | | 1:05 |
| 39. | "The Battle of the Gru House" | | 2:46 |
| 40. | "The Battle for Baby Gru" | | 5:06 |
| 41. | "Megaminions Save the Day" | | 0:29 |
| 42. | "A Good Dad" | | 2:17 |
| 43. | "Gru's Apology" | | 1:19 |
| 44. | "Everybody Wants to Rule the World" | Despicable Me 4 cast | 2:35 |
| Total length: | | | 73:58 |
