= North Carolina Azalea Festival =

Annual community festival in Wilmington, North Carolina

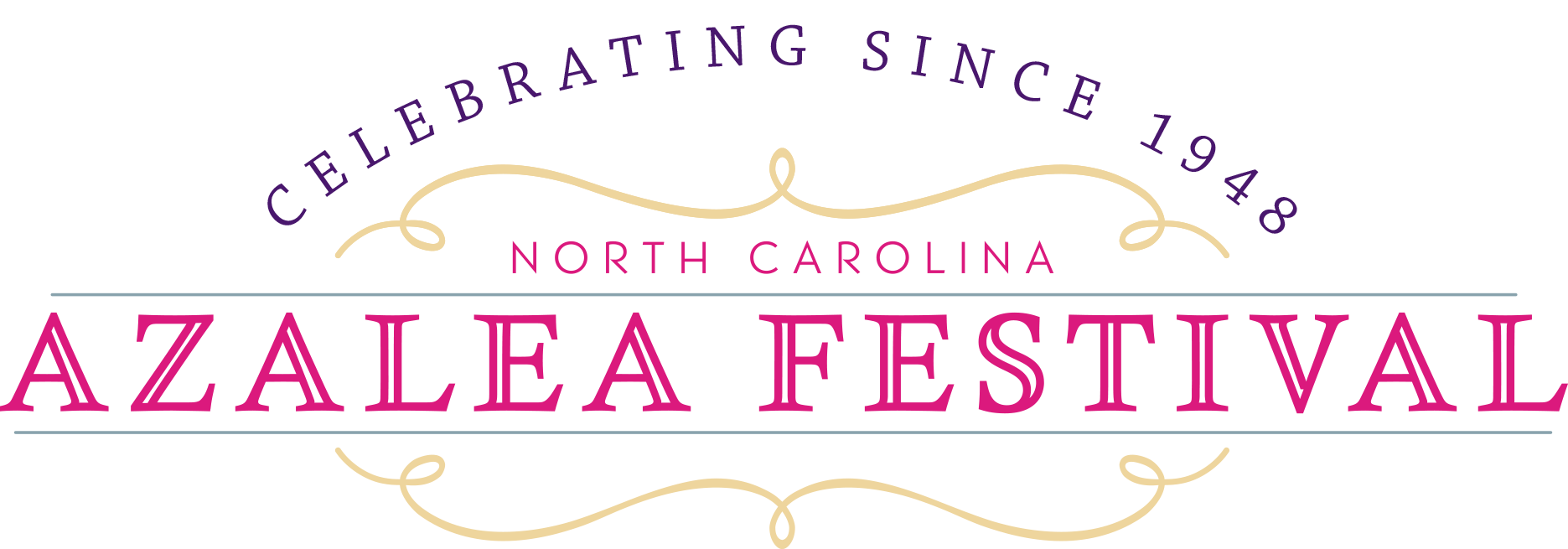
- Southern Charm In Full Bloom

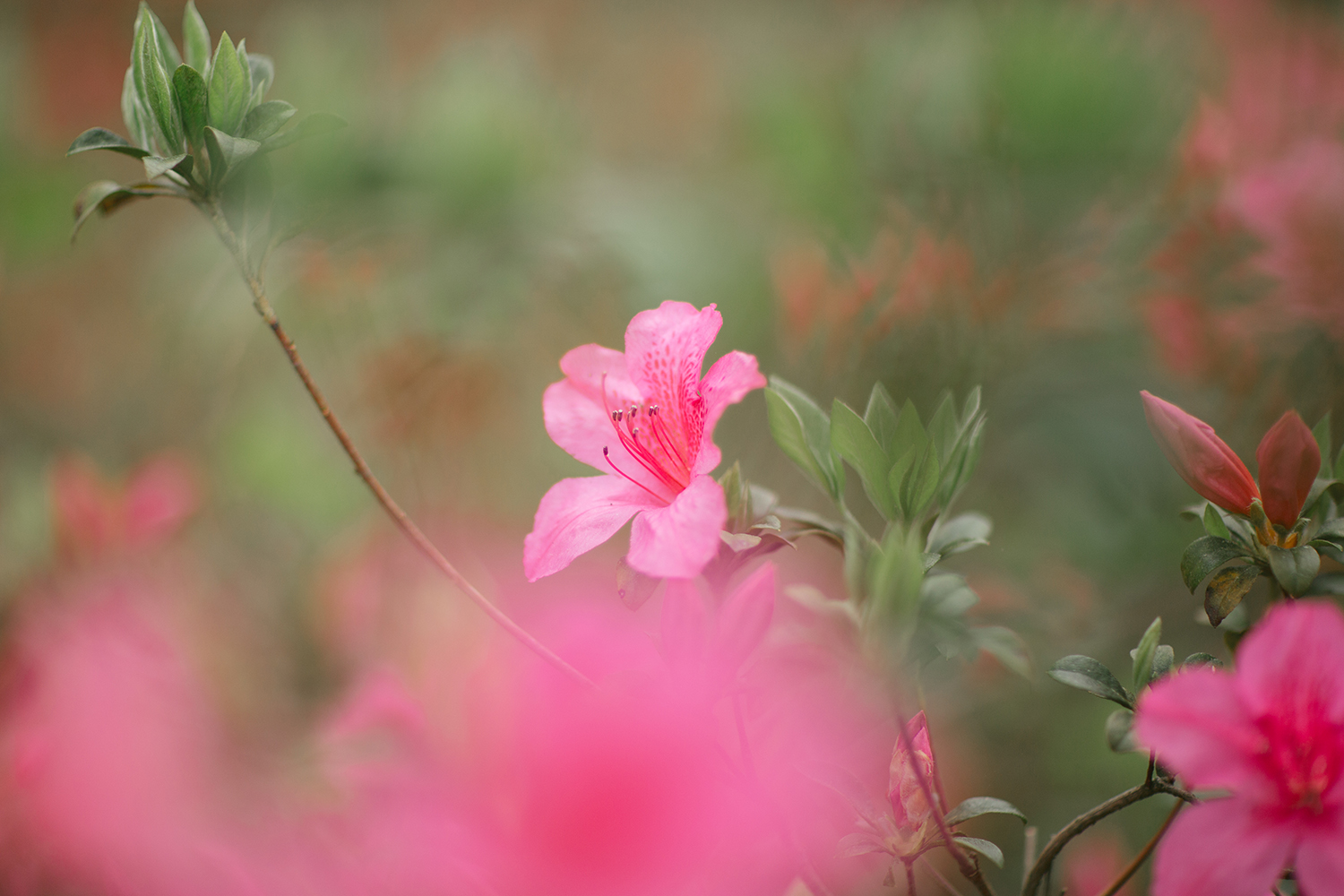
- Genre: Festival
- Date: April
- Frequency: Annually
- Locations: Wilmington, NC
- Coordinates: 34.20991°N 77.84906°W
- Country: United States
- Inaugurated: 1948
- Founder: Hugh Morton
- Previous event: April 3–7, 2019
- Next event: 2021
- Participants: Over 1,000 Volunteers
- Attendance: 300,000
- Website: ncazaleafestival.org

The North Carolina Azalea Festival is an annual community festival in Wilmington, North Carolina. The largest festival of its kind in the state, it was founded in 1948, and takes place in April.

== History ==
The Azalea Festival began in 1948 as an idea of Dr. W. Houston Moore, M.D. Dr. Moore held a meeting in Wilmington's Chamber of Commerce with civil club representatives to discuss and begin planning for the first Azalea Festival. The Festival would take place in April 1948 and would serve the purpose of showcasing the local gardens such as Airlie Gardens, Orton Gardens, and Greenfield Gardens.

The following is a letter written by Mr. Morton to Gayle Ward in response to her request for information about the Festival beginnings:

Dear Gayle:

Dr. W. Houston Moore, M.D., a wonderful old gentleman who lived in the 1800 block of Market Street, had been active through the Rotary Club in beautifying Greenfield Park with azaleas, dogwoods, and other flowering plants. In 1947 he decided to invite all of the leading civic clubs in Wilmington to send a representative to a meeting at the Chamber of Commerce in its building behind City Hall to discuss the feasibility of holding an Azalea Festival that would celebrate the beauty of Greenfield, Orton, Airlie and other gardens around town. I was sent by the Wilmington Jaycees as their representative to that first meeting.

There are probably minutes somewhere that list all of those who attended that first gathering. I can recall Henry Rehder, Wallace Murchison, Kenneth Sprunt, Star-News Editor John Hope and Paul T. Marshburn as being among ones who were particularly supportive of Dr. Moore's idea.

I had a business trip that caused me to miss the second meeting of the somewhat informal Committee, but upon returning to town I was advised that I had been elected-selected President of the first Azalea Festival. I did my level best to talk my way out of that, but Dr. Moore was a persuasive and determined guy, and there were promises of support from all around the room from others on the Committee.

When the first Azalea Festival took place in April 1948 the gardens were at peak beauty, the weather was perfect, and the Festival cleared $5,000, a profit we knew we had to have or we would never see the second Festival. Our first, and absolutely Ideal Queen was Jacqueline White of RKO Radio Pictures. The top other celebrities were Ted Malone, who originated his coast-to-coast ABC Radio Network program from a platform in front of the Community Center on Second Street, and NC Governor R. Gregg Cherry, who crowned the Queen at Lumina Ballroom on Wrightsville Beach. The community was saddened when Dr. Moore died during the summer following the 1948 Festival, but the whole town was pleased to believe he died happy that the first Azalea Festival was a rousing success.

Best regards,

Hugh Morton

A number of events have made up the Azalea Festival schedule, including the Azalea Open Invitational where Arnold Palmer took home the title in 1957.

The first sidewalk show was held in 1953 and has continued as tradition since.

The 2020 festival was cancelled in response to the coronavirus pandemic.

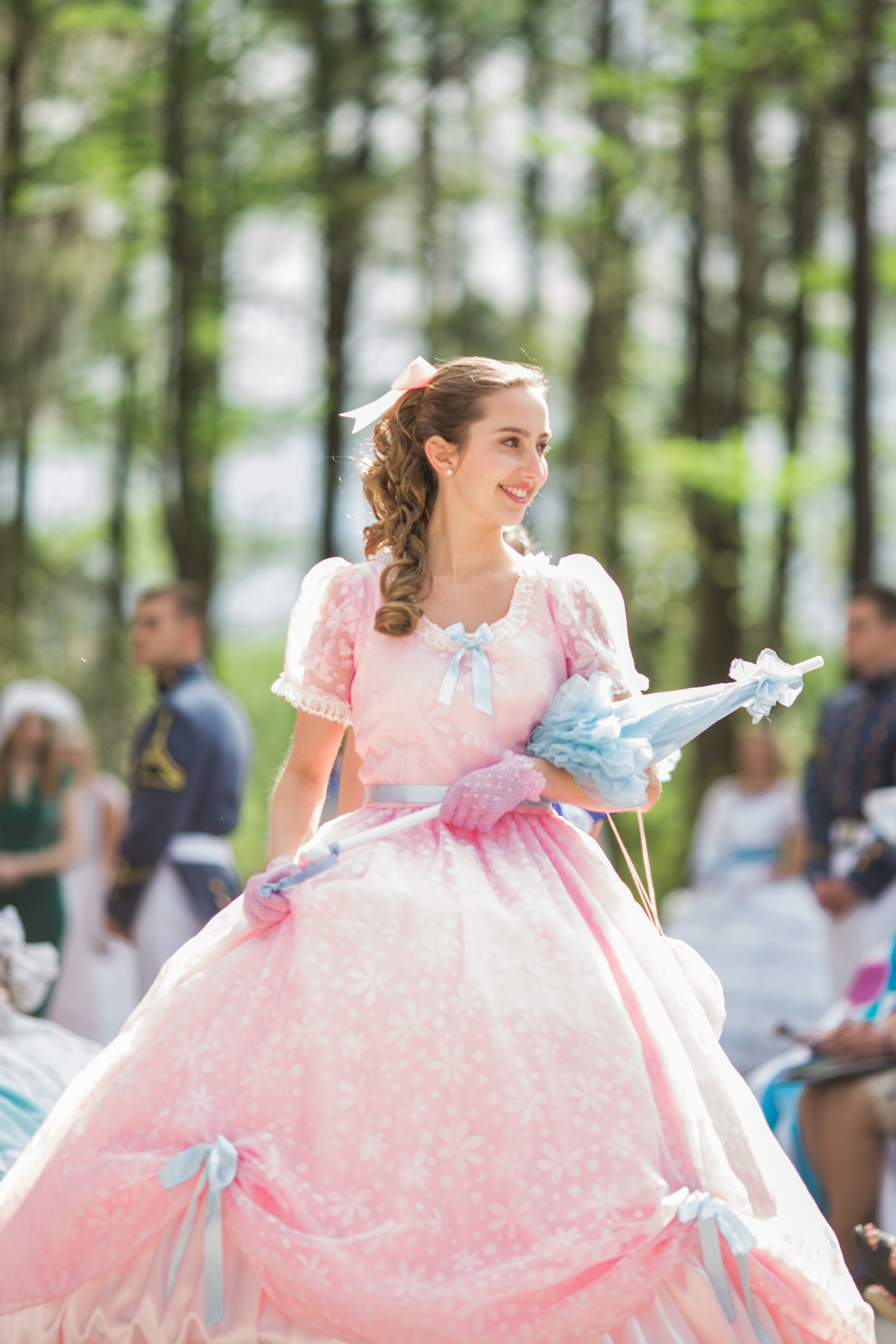
Azalea Belle at the 2016 event

== Customs and traditions ==
=== Airlie Gardens ===
Airlie Gardens span 67 acres (27 ha) of Wilmington property and was created in 1901. The gardens are less than a mile from the ocean and planted with various types of flora. Ownership of the gardens has changed hands several times and has gone from being a 640-acre (260 ha) land grant from King George II in 1735 to a now comparably smaller 67-acre (27 ha) garden open for public viewing. Garden tours are open to the public and include visits to several different areas of Airlie including the butterfly garden, a mystery grave, and the Minnie Evans Sculpture Garden. The latter has a "BottleChapel" along with both metal and ceramic sculptures. Airlie Gardens also hosts summer camps and educational programs are available to the public.

=== Cape Fear Garden Club Azalea Belles ===
A tradition held by the Azalea Festival is the "Belles": young ladies who serve as hostesses and guides to the gardens in the area. This tradition began in 1969 under a suggestion by the president of the Cape Fear Garden Club at that time. The first year, seven girls played the role of Azalea Belles. To become an Azalea Belle, one must apply for the position; however, precedence is given to those girls who are either daughters or granddaughters of Cape Fear Garden Club members. Girls from New Hanover County High School are next to be a NC Azalea Belle. If the Belle is not a member of the Cape Fear Garden Club, she may be "committee sponsored" by applying through the belle chairman. New Azalea Belle policies were adopted in 2006. The number of belles needed for each year is dependent upon the size of the gardens in the tour and is determined by the belle chairman. Also, a young lady may only serve as a Belle one year and may not be in the Azalea Festival Scholarship Pageant during the year that she serves as a belle. As of August 2020, "Belles" are no longer affiliated with the North Carolina Azalea Festival.

=== North Carolina Azalea Festival Queens ===
The North Carolina Azalea Festival has brought a number of people to the Wilmington area to serve as the Festival's Queen. Queens are crowned during the first day of the festival. Past participants include:

- 1948- Jacqueline White
- 1949- Martha Hyer
- 1950- Gregg Sherwood
- 1951- Margaret Sheridan
- 1952- Cathy Downs (actress)
- 1953- Alexis Smith (actress)
- 1954- Ella Raines
- 1955- Sara Shane
- 1956- Polly Bergen
- 1957- Kathryn Grayson
- 1958- Esther Williams
- 1959- Debra Paget
- 1960- Linda Christian
- 1961- Shelley Fabares
- 1962- Whitney Blake
- 1963- Nancy Malone
- 1964- Abby Dalton
- 1965- Patricia Blair
- 1966- Ulla Strömstedt
- 1967- Melody Patterson
- 1968- Linda Cristal
- 1969- Chris Noel
- 1970- Karen Jensen
- 1971- Phyllis Davis
- 1972- Ann Elder
- 1973- Joan Van Ark
- 1974- Sharon Gless
- 1975- Stephanie Braxton
- 1976- Rita McLaughlin
- 1977- Francesca James
- 1978- Nancy Addison
- 1979- Laurie Walters
- 1980- Lacey Neuhaus
- 1981 – Maureen Teefy
- 1982- Lynda Goodfriend
- 1983- Tina Gayle
- 1984- Sharon Wyatt
- 1985- Phylicia Rashad (first African-American Azalea Queen)
- 1986- Kim Zimmer
- 1987- Robin Greer
- 1988- Kim Morgan Greene
- 1989- Rebeca Arthur
- 1990- Kate Collins
- 1991- Tonja Walker
- 1992- Clare Carey
- 1993- Kelly Ripa
- 1994- Laura Sisk
- 1995- Laura Bonarrigo
- 1996- Gina Tognoni
- 1997- Lauren Roman (50th Azalea Queen, first Azalea Queen born in Wilmington)
- 1998- Alla Korot
- 1999- Sydney Penny
- 2000- Nina Repeta
- 2001- Nikki Deloach
- 2002- Valerie Wildman
- 2003- Tracey Bregman
- 2004- Dari Alexander
- 2005- Kelly Packard
- 2006- Tanisha Lynn
- 2007- Amy Pietz
- 2008 – Barbara Alyn Woods
- 2009 – Amrapali Ambegaokar
- 2010 – Lindsey Shaw
- 2011- Heather French Henry
- 2012- Erika Dunlap
- 2013- Jennifer Wayne
- 2014 – Kristen Haglund
- 2015 – Mallory Hagan
- 2016 - Anna Kooiman
- 2017 – Kira Kazantsev
- 2018 – Beth Troutman
- 2019 – Charlotte Crush
- 2020 – Brianna Venkus
- 2021 – Victora Huggins
- 2022 – Nia Franklin
- 2025 – Bethany Joy Lenz

=== Celebrities ===
Celebrities who have visited the southern town of Wilmington for the festival (including as guests, visitors, Queens, and emcees to the Festival) have included:

- Ronald Reagan – 1959 Festival Emcee
- Michael Jordan – 1982
- Cathy Downs (actress) – 1952 Azalea Queen
- Andy Griffith – 1958 Festival Emcee
- Phylicia Rashad (actress) – 1985 Azalea Queen
- Kelly Ripa – 1993 Azalea Queen
- Esther Williams – 1958 Azalea Queen
- Barbara Alyn Woods (actress) – 2008 Azalea Queen
- Kevin Frazier – 2008
- Chelsea Cooley (Miss USA 2005) – 2008
- Captain Mark Davis (USN Grand Marshal) – 2008
- Lee Norris (actor) – 2008
- Hilarie Burton (actress) – 2008
- Chad Michael Murray (actor) – 2008
- Jessica Marie Jacobs (Miss NC) – 2008
- David Cook (singer) – 2009 Festival Performing Artists
- Kerri Walsh Jennings – 2015
- Clark Beckham - 2016
- Duran Duran - 2017
