= The Golden Gloves Story =

1950 film

- Directed by: Felix E. Feist
- Written by: D.D. Beauchamp; William Sellers; Joe Ansen; Felix E. Feist
- Produced by: Sherman A. Harris; Carl Krueger
- Starring: James Dunn; Dewey Martin; Gregg Sherwood
- Cinematography: John L. Russell
- Edited by: William F. Claxton
- Music by: Arthur Lange; Marlin Skiles
- Production company: Central National Pictures
- Distributed by: Eagle-Lion Films
- Release date: March 22, 1950
- Running time: 76 minutes
- Country: United States
- Language: English

The Golden Gloves Story is a 1950 American sports film directed by Felix E. Feist. It tells the story of boxer Nick Martel as he competes in the Golden Gloves boxing tournament and falls in love with Patti, the daughter of referee Joe Riley.

== Plot ==
Joe Riley is a boxing referee who lives life by the prizefight ring rules. Golden Glove contestants Nick Martel and Bob Gilmore compete for the love of Patty, Riley's daughter.

== Cast ==
- James Dunn as Joe Riley
- Dewey Martin as Nick Martel
- Gregg Sherwood as Iris Anthony
- Kevin O'Morrison as Bob Gilmore
- Kay Westfall as Patti Riley
- Fern Persons as Mrs. Burke
