= Turn Up the Sunshine =

Single by Diana Ross featuring Tame Impala

from the album Minions: The Rise of Gru (Original Motion Picture Soundtrack)
- Released: May 19, 2022
- Genre: Funk; disco; dance-pop
- Length: 3:49
- Label: Decca
- Songwriters: Jack Antonoff; Patrik Berger; Sam Dew; Kevin Parker
- Producer: Jack Antonoff

Diana Ross singles chronology
| "I Still Believe" (2021) | "Turn Up the Sunshine" (2022) |

Tame Impala singles chronology
| "The Boat I Row" (2022) | "Turn Up the Sunshine" (2022) | "New Gold" (2022) |

"Turn Up the Sunshine" is a song recorded by American singer Diana Ross featuring Australian musician Tame Impala from the soundtrack to the animated film Minions: The Rise of Gru (2022). The song was written by Jack Antonoff, Kevin Parker (Tame Impala), Sam Dew and Patrik Berger. The song was originally recorded for Ross' studio album Thank You (2021).

It was released on May 19, 2022 by Decca Records as the lead single from the soundtrack album for the film.

== Critical reception ==
Tyler Golsen in his review called the song "almost blindingly bright and exuberant", which groovy disco thump radiates summer energy. Tom Breihan of Stereogum wrote that "Turn Up the Sunshine" sounds like Antonoff and Parker are trying to recreate the euphoria of the music that Diana Ross and Chic recorded together in 1980, and that it is "a big, shiny dance-pop track with a utopian chorus and some nasty low-end work".

== Track listing ==
Digital download and streaming

1. "Turn Up the Sunshine" – 3:49

Digital download and streaming

1. "Turn Up the Sunshine" (Pnau Remix) – 3:40

== Personnel ==
Musicians

- Diana Ross – vocals
- Kevin Parker – vocals, guitar, bass, keyboards, percussion
- Jack Antonoff – guitar, drums, sound effects, bass, keyboards, percussion
- Sam Dew – background vocals
- Bobby Hawk – violin
- Sean Hutchinson – drums
- Michael Riddleberger – drums, percussion
- Evan Smith – background vocals, saxophone, flute
- Verdine White – bass

Technical

- Jack Antonoff – producer, recording engineer
- Chris Gehringer – mastering engineer
- Chris Kasych - recording engineer
- Kevin Parker – recording engineer
- John Rooney – assistant recording engineer
- Jon Sher – assistant recording engineer
- Laura Sisk – recording engineer
- Mark "Spike" Stent – mixing engineer
- Matt Wolach – assistant mixing engineer

== Charts ==
Chart performance for "Turn Up the Sunshine"
| Chart (2022) | Peak position |
|---|---|
| UK Singles Downloads (OCC) | 57 |
| UK Singles Sales (OCC) | 59 |
| US Adult Contemporary (Billboard) | 19 |
