= Puss in Boots: The Last Wish (soundtrack) =

2022 soundtrack album by Heitor Pereira

Puss in Boots: The Last Wish (Original Motion Picture Soundtrack)

Soundtrack album / film score by Heitor Pereira
- Released: December 16, 2022
- Recorded: June–November 2022
- Genres: Film soundtrack; film score
- Length: 1:33:10
- Label: Back Lot Music
- Producer: Heitor Pereira

Heitor Pereira chronology
Minions: The Rise of Gru (2022)	Puss in Boots: The Last Wish (Original Motion Picture Soundtrack) (2022)	Despicable Me 4 (2024)

Singles from Puss in Boots: The Last Wish (Original Motion Picture Soundtrack)
- 1. "La Vida es Una" Released: December 9, 2022

Puss in Boots: The Last Wish (Original Motion Picture Soundtrack) is the soundtrack to the 2022 film Puss in Boots: The Last Wish, a sequel to Puss in Boots (2011). The album was released on December 16, 2022, by Back Lot Music, and featured musical score composed by Heitor Pereira, who replaced Henry Jackman, the composer of the first film. It featured five songs performed by Antonio Banderas, Dan Navarro, Gaby Moreno and Pereira, with his score accompanying the remainder of the album.

== Background ==
On June 29, 2022, Heitor Pereira was announced as the film's composer, who also began recording the score during that period. He was recommended by the film's executive producer and Illumination CEO Chris Meledandri, whom Pereira had worked with on their productions, most notably for the Despicable Me and Minions films and has some experience with DreamWorks with its Madagascar specials like Merry Madagascar and Madly Madagascar. The album featured five original songs performed by Karol G, Daniel Oviedo, Heitor Pereira, Paul Fisher, Dan Navarro, and Gaby Moreno. Karol G performed the track "La Vida es Una" and co-produced it with longtime producer Ovy on the Drums. The song was released as a single on December 9, 2022. Pereira co-wrote the track "Fearless Hero" performed by Antonio Banderas and co-written by Dan Navarro and Paul Fisher, and "Por Que Te Vas", co-written with and performed by Gaby Moreno. It also featured the cover of The Doors' "This Is The End" performed by Dan Navarro. The film also featured score tracks from Shrek 2 composed by Harry Gregson-Williams, with the tracks "Obliged to Help" and "The End / Happily Ever After". The soundtrack was released on December 16, 2022, five days ahead of the film's release.

== Reception ==
Odie Henderson of The Boston Globe wrote that "the music has a lovely Spanish flair" and "several catchy ditties by composer Heitor Pereira". Daily Herald called the score as "Ennio Morricone-sque".

== Accolades ==
Periera's score was listed to be under contention for the 95th Academy Awards under the Best Original Score category, as was the original song: "La Vida es Una" by Karol G and "Fearless Hero", was under contention for the Best Original Song category. Neither of the score and the songs, could get shortlisted. It received a nomination for Best Original Score in an Animated Film at the 13th Hollywood Music in Media Awards, losing to Alexandre Desplat for Pinocchio.

== Track listing ==
No.	Title	Writer(s)	Performer(s)	Length
1.	"Star Light-Star Bright"			1:20
2.	"Fearless Hero"	Heitor Pereira; Dan Navarro; Paul Fisher	Antonio Banderas; Pereira	4:57
3.	"Vet's Office"			2:00
4.	"Retrospective"			0:57
5.	"You Need to Retire"			1:14
6.	"Bounty Hunter"			3:28
7.	"Eulogy"			1:15
8.	"Mama Luna's Cat Rescue"			0:50
9.	"Track That Cat"			0:55
10.	"Meet Dog"			1:54
11.	"The Three Bears Crime Family"			1:28
12.	"Legend of the Wishing Star"			1:33
13.	"Horner Heist"			5:57
14.	"Getaway"			2:38
15.	"Get My Wish"			0:53
16.	"The Enchanted Map"			1:38
17.	"Travel Montage"			0:43
18.	"The Dark Forest"			0:54
19.	"A Different Path for Everyone"			1:39
20.	"Birthday Wish Rules"			0:58
21.	"Stop and Smell the Roses"			3:03
22.	"Mowing Posies"			1:36
23.	"Ethical Bug"			0:52
24.	"A Close Shave"			2:47
25.	"Fist Full of Characters"			0:50
26.	"Let's Get Him"			0:57
27.	"Running Through the Wood"			0:26
28.	"Therapy Dog"			1:09
29.	"Santa Coloma"			0:53
30.	"Cabin in the Woods"			1:11
31.	"We Are Home"			0:42
32.	"Your Favorite Book"			1:11
33.	"A Better Point of View"			1:22
34.	"The Value of a Life"			1:40
35.	"Bear Cottage Heist"			1:25
36.	"Puss and Kitty's Flamenco Dance"			2:14
37.	"Cave of Reflection"			1:04
38.	"Bear Family Counseling"			2:18
39.	"The Smell of Fear"			2:34
40.	"Go Ahead, Run For It"			1:51
41.	"A Proper Family"			1:26
42.	"All You Care About"			1:33
43.	"The Good, Bad, and Goldi"			3:30
44.	"He's Here for Me"			1:31
45.	"The Fight with Death"			2:23
46.	"No Magic Required"			0:36
47.	"Holy Frijoles!"			1:02
48.	"Team Friendship"			0:51
49.	"Make a Wish"			2:26
50.	"La Vida Es Una"	Karol G; Daniel Oviedo; Keityn	Karol G	3:10
51.	"This Is the End"	Jim Morrison; Ray Manzarek; Robby Krieger; John Densmore	Navarro	1:29
52.	"Por Que te Vas"	Pereira; Gaby Moreno	Moreno	2:58
53.	"Fearless Hero (Hero Version)"	Pereira; Navarro; Fisher	Banderas; Pereira	2:56
Total length:				1:33:10

== Additional music ==
The track "Narco" by Blasterjaxx and Timmy Trumpet was featured in the second trailer of the film, and Pitbull's "Café Con Leche" was featured in the final trailer. The tracks were used for promotional purposes, and was neither featured in the soundtrack, nor in the film.
