= Anna Kooiman =

American-Australian news anchor and television panelist (born 1984)

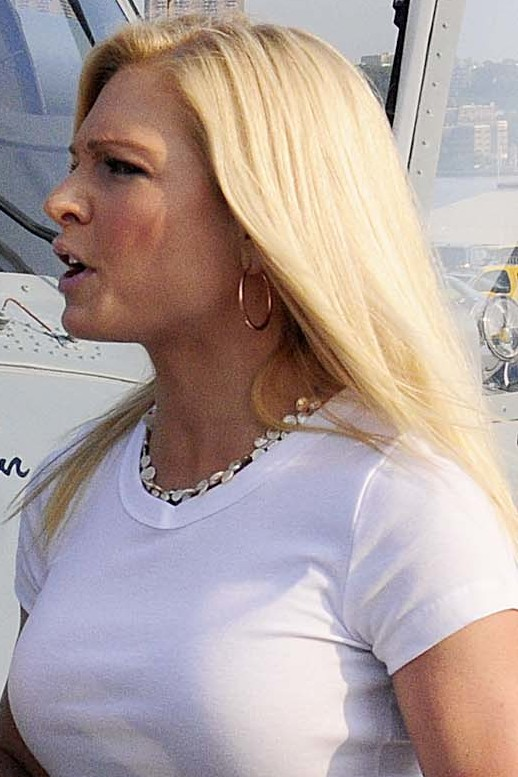
- Kooiman in 2012
- Born: Anna Brooks Kooiman; February 7, 1984 (age 42); Charlotte, North Carolina, US
- Education: University of North Carolina at Wilmington (2005)
- Occupation: News anchor
- Years active: 2004–present
- Television: NewsNation
- Spouse: Tim Stuckey (m. 2015)
- Children: 2

Anna Brooks Kooiman is an American news anchor and television panelist, working for NewsNation as a weekend anchor based in New York City since April, 2024. From 2011 to 2016, she was an anchor and reporter for Fox News based in New York City. From there, she moved to Australia, and was with News Corp's Australian division until 2022 as a substitute anchor and panelist on various news programs for Network Ten.

== Early life ==
Kooiman grew up in Charlotte, North Carolina, where her parents still live and own businesses. Of Dutch ancestry, she went to Myers Park High School (2002 graduate), where she played softball and also played with the SouthPark Youth Association.

== Career ==
Kooiman began her online fitness business for moms/mums, Strong Sexy Mammas, in 2019. The company is based in Sydney, Australia. Kooiman taught a half dozen live classes at boutique fitness studios in Bondi Beach and periodically teaches online classes via Strong Sexy Mammas. Strong Sexy Mammas is primarily a video on demand and education platform for women's fitness. Kooiman taught fitness classes in Charlotte, North Carolina from 2008 to 2011. Kooiman's early work in TV broadcast journalism began with her working as a sideline reporter for Fox Sports during her college years at UNC Wilmington in 2004. After graduation, she continued her work as a reporter, anchor and video journalist for WWAY in Wilmington, North Carolina in 2005. In January 2007 Kooiman moved to Toledo, Ohio, and began working for the local NBC affiliate, WNWO, as morning anchor and reporter. While there, she served as franchise reporter for a partnership with U.S. Marshals that helped catch over 100 fugitives. In May 2008, Kooiman moved back to Charlotte, North Carolina, to work as an anchor/reporter/host for Fox News Rising, a four-hour news and entertainment morning show on the then-FOX affiliate WCCB (as of 2013, WCCB became a CW-affiliated network). While at WCCB-TV, she reported on local news stories, entertainment, weather and traffic.

In December 2011, Kooiman became a New York-based correspondent covering health and fitness as well as general assignment reporting for FNC. She was also host on the weekend morning show.

Kooiman covered terror attacks in San Bernardino, California, and Orlando, Florida. She was also out in the elements during major weather events like Super Storm Sandy, tornadoes in Moore, Oklahoma, and the 2016 U.S. blizzard. Kooiman covered the debates for the GOP primary in Detroit. She has also hosted the All American New Year for FNC. Her franchise, "Roadtrip with Anna Kooiman" takes viewers around the United States, checking off bucket list items.

Kooiman left New York City to start a family in September 2016 and moved to Sydney, Australia, with her husband, who is originally from Australia. As part of corporate synergy of 21st Century Fox, Foxtel and Ten Network Holdings, she worked as a substitute anchor and panelist until 2022 on Network Ten news programs Studio 10 and The Project.

In April 2024, Kooiman moved back to New York City and began her stint as a weekend anchor at NewsNation.

== Personal life ==
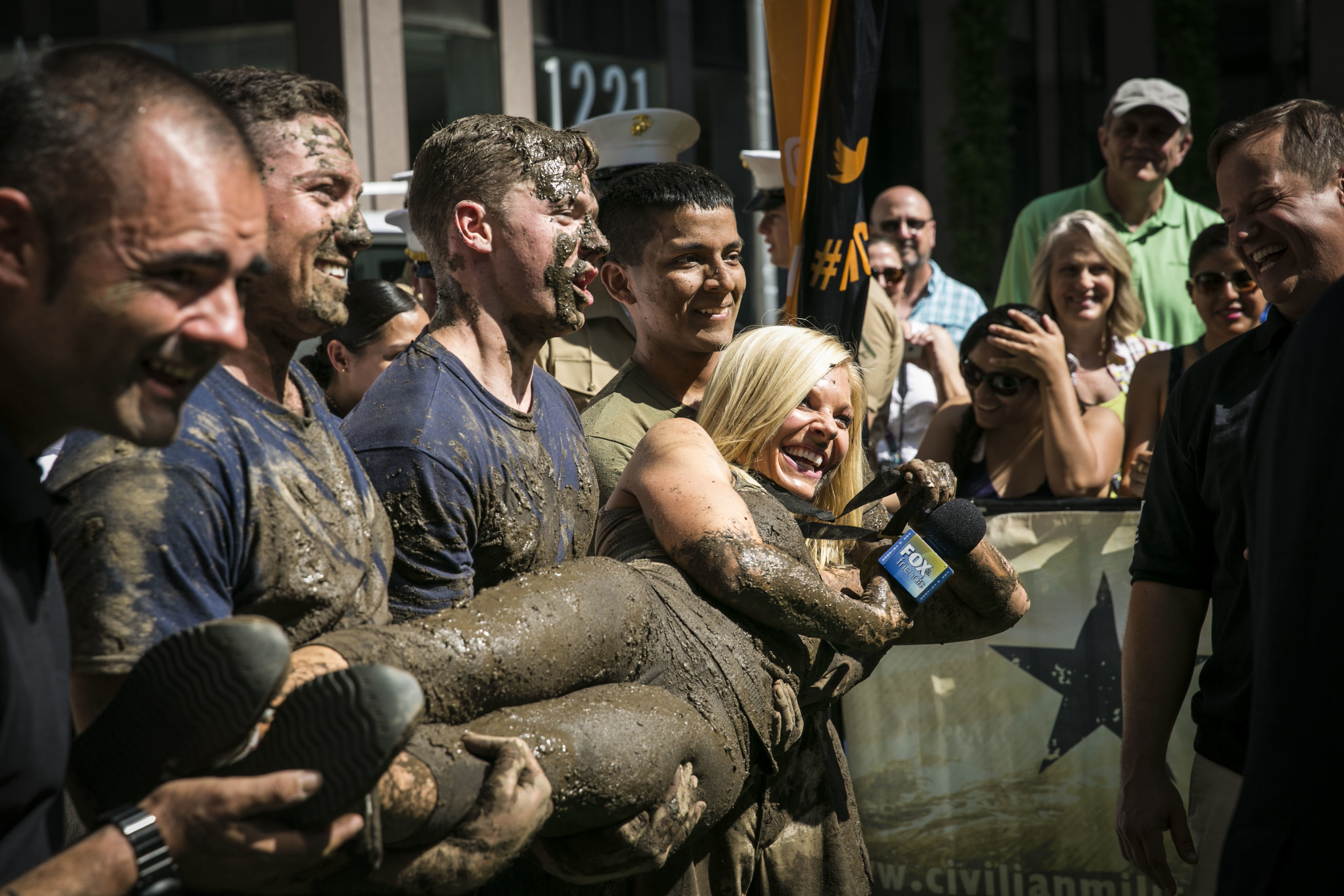
Members of the 24th Marine Expeditionary Unit hold up Kooiman after an obstacle course during Fleet Week New York in 2016

On February 8, 2015, Kooiman announced her engagement on her Facebook page. She became engaged to her Australian boyfriend Tim Stuckey while on a personal vacation to Australia; her boyfriend proposing to her while both were watching the sunrise over Sydney Harbour. The couple was married on July 31, 2015, at Manhattan's Central Park Loeb Boathouse. Anna's husband appeared in 2016 on FOX & Friends for a cooking segment, which received social media attention for using the signature Aussie condiment, Vegemite. Kooiman is known on social media for her international travel and adventures.

She had her first child in January 2018 and second in May 2020.

Kooiman has completed four marathons and numerous triathlons. While working for WNWO-TV in Toledo, she ran the 2008 Glass City Marathon in 3:27:22 and finished 3rd overall in the women's division. In April 2014, Kooiman completed the Boston Marathon while reporting on the race and conducting interviews for Fox News. The event, one of the World Marathon Majors and run annually since 1897, always attracts worldwide attention, but after the previous year's bombings, it drew extra media attention. In November 2014, Kooiman raised over $55,000 on Crowdrise and in direct donations to Folds of Honor while running the New York City Marathon in 3:54:15 with Major Dan Rooney. The organization provides scholarships and assistance to families of American troops who died or were injured in service to their country.

Kooiman was a Ronald McDonald House Ambassador in Sydney Australia. Back in college, Kooiman first got involved with the charity when she served as the philanthropy chair of her sorority, Alpha Delta Pi while at University of North Carolina at Wilmington. Beginning in August 2008, Kooiman was a fitness instructor in Charlotte. She is AFAA and Turbo Kick Certified. She taught up to ten classes each week. She also served as a fitness instructor to kids in an inner-city after-school program.

In April 2016, Kooiman was crowned Festival Queen for the North Carolina Azalea Festival.

== See also ==
- New Yorkers in journalism
