= Untold Stories (Heitor Pereira album) =

Studio album by Heitor Pereira
- Released: July 1, 2001
- Recorded: 2000
- Genre: Instrumental hybrid music
- Label: Backyard Records

Heitor Pereira chronology
Heitor TP (1994)	Untold Stories (2001)

Professional ratings
Review scores
Source	Rating
CD Baby	link

Untold Stories is the second studio solo album by the Brazilian musician Heitor Pereira, released in 2001 (see 2001 in music).

== Track listing ==
1. Spanish Blues
2. Indian Summer
3. When Spirits Dance
4. Xamego
5. Backyard on Sunday
6. Passion
7. Meu Primeiro Amor
8. China
9. Cafe
10. Afro
11. Blues Detour
12. Stewart's Vamp
13. Sunny Bridge
14. Mali
15. Two Kids
