= Heitor (album) =

Studio album by Heitor Pereira
- Released: 1994
- Recorded: 1993
- Genre: Instrumental hybrid music
- Label: EastWest

Heitor Pereira chronology
Heitor TP (1987)	Heitor (1994)	Untold Stories (2001)

Heitor is the first compact disc studio solo album by the Brazilian musician Heitor Pereira, released in 1994 (see 1994 in music).

== Track listing ==
No.	Title	Writer(s)	Length
1.	"Ligeirin"	Heitor T.P.	3:48
2.	"Infinity"	Heitor T.P.	3:47
3.	"River of Life (Mara's Theme)"	Simon Climie, Dee Fredrix, Heitor T.P.	3:47
4.	"Mal da Lua"	Heitor T.P.	4:39
5.	"Casa do Baião"	Heitor T.P.	3:25
6.	"Pulsar"	Heitor T.P.	4:48
7.	"Manchester" (special guest: Mick Hucknall)	Heitor T.P.	5:11
8.	"Unreal"	Heitor T.P.	4:20
9.	"Marcha do Tempo"	Heitor T.P.	4:38
10.	"João Pernambuco"	Heitor T.P.	3:32
11.	"Frevo (Pra Nitera)"	Heitor T.P.	5:33
12.	"Mara"	Heitor T.P.	4:42
Total length:			52:10

== Credits ==
- Heitor T.P. - Bass, Cavaquinho, Drum programming, Engineer, Guitar, Matches, MIDI Guitar, Percussion, Synthesizer Bass, Arranger, Producer, Mixing
- Paulinho Braga - Percussion
- Paulinho da Costa - Percussion
- Dee Fredrix - Vocals
- Mick Hucknall - Vocals
- Claudio Infante - Drums
- Ian Kirkham - Alto saxophone
- Daren Klein - Mixing
- Kevin Lamb - Synthesizer
- The London Session Orchestra - Strings
- Arthur Maia - Bass, Fretless bass
- Guy Pratt - Bass
- Simon Climie - Vocal Arrangement
- Edward Shearmur - String Arrangements
- Marcos Suzano - Pandeiro, Percussion
- Gota Yashiki - Cymbals, Drum programming, Drums, Percussion
- Stewart Levine - Executive Producer
- Julie Gardner - Assistant Engineer
- Henry Binns - Assistant Engineer
- Nigel Godrich - Engineer
- Bernie Grundman - Mastering
- Cindy Palmano - Art Direction, Photography
- Alan Reinl - Design
