= Gregg Sherwood =

American socialite and actress (1923-2011)

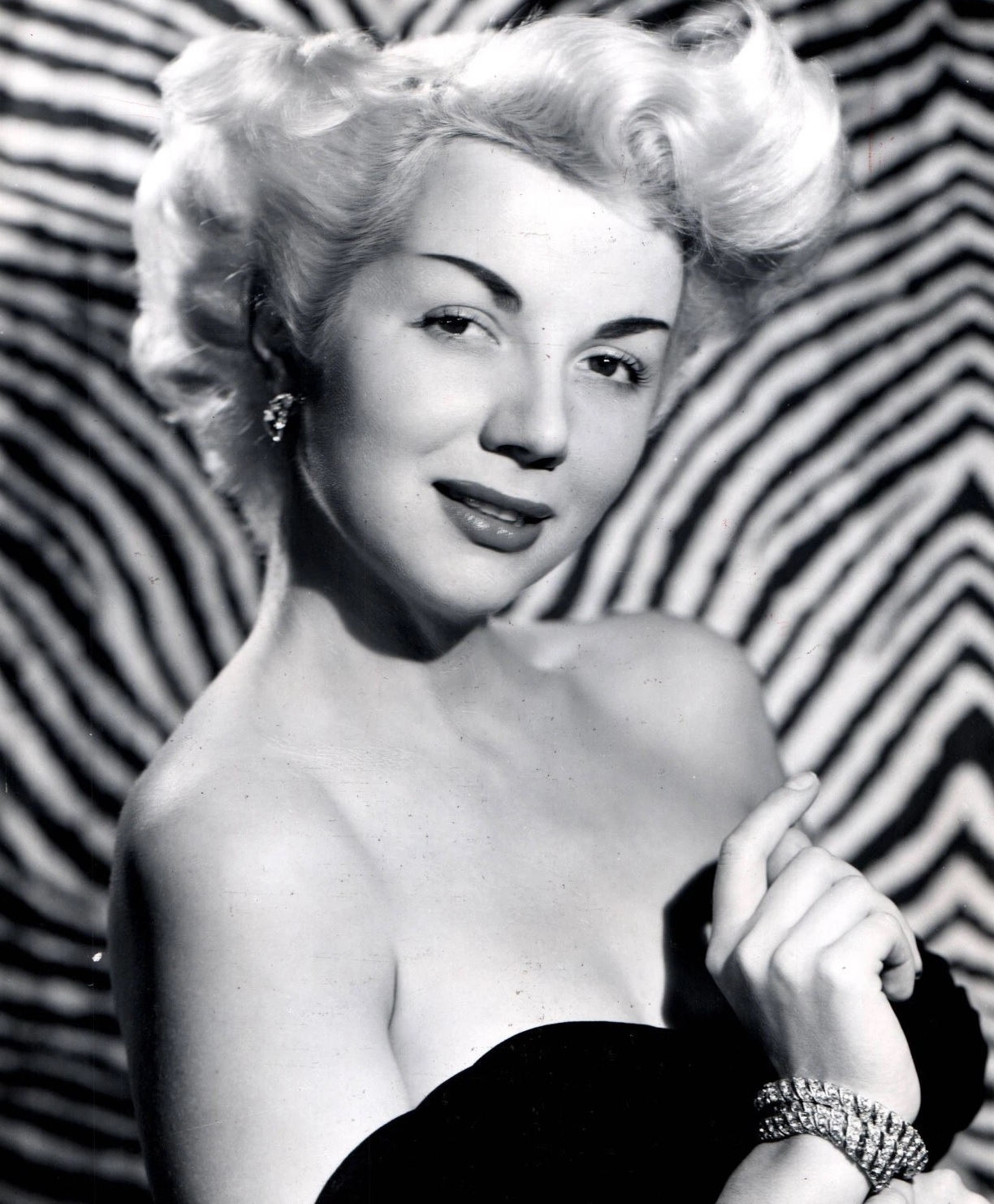
- Sherwood in 1955
- Born: October 21, 1923; New York City, United States
- Died: May 27, 2011 (aged 87); Palm Beach, Florida, United States
- Occupations: Actress and socialite
- Spouses: Willy Zebell; Walter Sherwin; Horace Dodge Jr.; Dennis Moran

Gregg Sherwood, born Dora Mae Fjelstad, (October 21, 1923 – May 27, 2011) was an American socialite and actress.

== Biography ==
Sherwood was born in New York City but moved to Beloit, Wisconsin with her mother when she was three. She enrolled in a modeling school in New York in the early 1940s, and participated in beauty pageants. In 1950, she was the Queen of the North Carolina Azalea Festival. During the later 1940s and the 1950s, Sherwood worked as a chorus girl and model, appearing in ads, the cover of TV Guide, and in Wink, a pinup magazine, which did a cover story on her. She also had some minor film roles between 1948 and 1953. She had been divorced twice when she married Horace Dodge Jr., an heir to the Dodge founder family fortune, in 1953. The couple led a very expensive lifestyle; Horace Dodge initiated divorce proceedings in 1961, saying "I can't afford the woman". However, the divorce wasn't final when Horace Dodge died in 1963, and Sherwood inherited $11 million. Sherwood subsequently sued her former mother-in-law and won another $9 million. Marrying a 27-year-old former policeman in 1965, Sherwood spent her millions and filed for bankruptcy in 1978. She was also charged with embezzling from her son's trust fund, to which she pleaded guilty.

She spent her last years living in Palm Beach, Florida, and was buried at the Our Lady Queen of Peace Cemetery in Royal Palm Beach, Florida.
