= Laura Sisk =

American audio engineer

Laura Sisk is an American audio engineer, mixing engineer, and vocal producer based in Los Angeles, California. She has received seven Grammy Awards from 18 nominations. Sisk frequently collaborates with record producer Jack Antonoff, engineering and mixing releases for artists such as Taylor Swift, Lana Del Rey, Lorde, St. Vincent, Kendrick Lamar, and Sabrina Carpenter.

== Early life and education ==
Sisk was raised in the United States. She attended Indiana University's Jacobs School of Music, where she graduated in 2010 with a degree in audio engineering.

== Career ==
Following her graduation, Sisk began working in recording studios as an engineer. She eventually established a working relationship with producer and musician Jack Antonoff, becoming a primary engineer and mixer for his band Bleachers, as well as for his production work with other artists.

In 2014, Sisk served as an engineer on Taylor Swift's fifth studio album, 1989, which won the Grammy Award for Album of the Year. Sisk subsequently engineered tracks on reputation (2017) and Lover (2019), and worked as an engineer on Swift's 2020 studio albums folklore and evermore. For her work on folklore, Sisk won her second Grammy Award for Album of the Year. She also engineered Midnights (2022), The Tortured Poets Department (2024), and portions of Swift's re-recorded albums series.

Sisk has also worked extensively with Lana Del Rey, beginning as an engineer on the 2019 album Norman Fucking Rockwell!. She continued to engineer and mix for Del Rey on subsequent releases, including Chemtrails over the Country Club (2021) and Did You Know That There's a Tunnel Under Ocean Blvd (2023).

In the alternative and pop genres, Sisk has engineered Lorde's studio albums Melodrama (2017) and Solar Power (2021), as well as St. Vincent's Masseduction (2017) and Daddy's Home (2021). She has also provided vocal production for Kali Uchis and Kelsey Lu, and mixing for Troye Sivan. Her engineering credits expanded further into hip-hop and contemporary pop, working on Kendrick Lamar's GNX (2024), Sabrina Carpenter's albums Short n' Sweet (2024) and Man's Best Friend (2025), and Phoebe Bridgers' Lost Weekend (2026).

== Selected discography ==
Sisk has engineering, mixing, and vocal production credits on numerous commercially released songs. Below is a selected list of full-length albums featuring her work.

Year	Artist	Album	Credited role
2026	Phoebe Bridgers	Lost Weekend	Engineer
2026	Troye Sivan	She's the Best	Mix
2026	Kelsey Lu	So Help Me God	Vocal Producer
2026	Kali Uchis	Sincerely	Vocal Producer
2025	Sabrina Carpenter	Man's Best Friend	Engineer
2024	Kendrick Lamar	GNX	Engineer
2024	Taylor Swift	The Tortured Poets Department	Engineer
2024	Sabrina Carpenter	Short n' Sweet	Engineer
2024	Bleachers	Bleachers	Engineer, Mix
2023	Lana Del Rey	Did You Know That There's a Tunnel Under Ocean Blvd	Engineer
2022	Taylor Swift	Midnights	Engineer
2022	Florence + The Machine	Dance Fever	Engineer, Mix
2021	Lorde	Solar Power	Engineer, Mix
2021	St. Vincent	Daddy's Home	Engineer
2021	Clairo	Sling	Engineer
2020	Taylor Swift	folklore & evermore	Engineer
2019	Lana Del Rey	Norman Fucking Rockwell!	Engineer
2017	Lorde	Melodrama	Engineer
2017	St. Vincent	Masseduction	Engineer
2014	Taylor Swift	1989	Engineer

== Awards and nominations ==
Sisk has received 18 Grammy Award nominations, resulting in 7 wins. Her nominations span categories including Album of the Year, Record of the Year, and Best Engineered Album.

Year	Ceremony	Nominated work	Artist	Category	Result
2027	69th Annual Grammy Awards	Lost Weekend	Phoebe Bridgers	Album of the Year	Nominated
2026	68th Annual Grammy Awards	"Luther"	Kendrick Lamar & SZA	Record of the Year	Won
2026	68th Annual Grammy Awards	GNX	Kendrick Lamar	Best Rap Album	Won
2026	68th Annual Grammy Awards	GNX	Kendrick Lamar	Album of the Year	Nominated
2026	68th Annual Grammy Awards	Man's Best Friend	Sabrina Carpenter	Album of the Year	Nominated
2025	67th Annual Grammy Awards	The Tortured Poets Department	Taylor Swift	Album of the Year	Nominated
2025	67th Annual Grammy Awards	Short n' Sweet	Sabrina Carpenter	Album of the Year	Nominated
2025	67th Annual Grammy Awards	"Fortnight"	Taylor Swift ft. Post Malone	Record of the Year	Nominated
2025	67th Annual Grammy Awards	Short n' Sweet	Sabrina Carpenter	Best Engineered Album, Non-Classical	Nominated
2024	66th Annual Grammy Awards	Midnights	Taylor Swift	Album of the Year	Won
2024	66th Annual Grammy Awards	Midnights	Taylor Swift	Best Pop Vocal Album	Won
2024	66th Annual Grammy Awards	Did You Know That There's a Tunnel Under Ocean Blvd	Lana Del Rey	Album of the Year	Nominated
2022	64th Annual Grammy Awards	evermore	Taylor Swift	Album of the Year	Nominated
2022	64th Annual Grammy Awards	Daddy's Home	St. Vincent	Best Engineered Album, Non-Classical	Nominated
2021	63rd Annual Grammy Awards	folklore	Taylor Swift	Album of the Year	Won
2020	62nd Annual Grammy Awards	Norman Fucking Rockwell!	Lana Del Rey	Album of the Year	Nominated
2018	60th Annual Grammy Awards	Melodrama	Lorde	Album of the Year	Nominated
2016	58th Annual Grammy Awards	1989	Taylor Swift	Album of the Year	Won

Note: Certain wins in genre-specific album categories are tied to the artist's overarching award, contributing to Sisk's total of 7 wins.
