= Heitor Pereira =

Brazilian composer (born 1960)

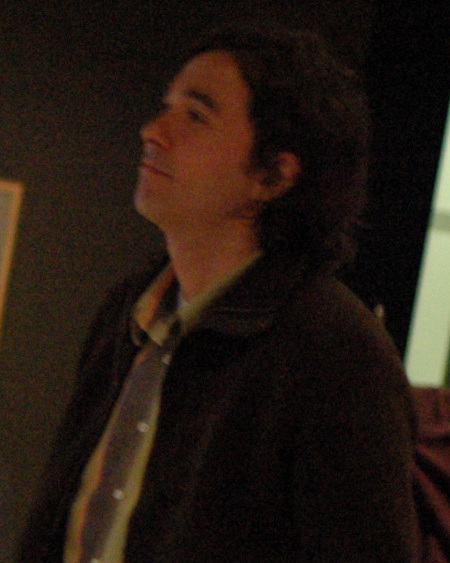
- Pereira in 2014

Background information
- Also known as: Heitor TP
- Born: Heitor Teixeira Pereira; 29 November 1960 (age 65); Rio Grande, Rio Grande do Sul, Brazil
- Genres: Film score, pop rock, electronic, soul
- Occupation: Composer
- Instruments: Vocals, guitar, keyboards, synthesizer
- Years active: 1980s–present
- Formerly of: Simply Red
- Website: www.heitorpereira.com

Heitor Teixeira Pereira (Portuguese pronunciation: [ejˈtoʁ tejˈʃejɾɐ peˈɾejɾɐ]; born 29 November 1960), or Heitor TP, is a Brazilian composer. In his career, Pereira has recorded with the band Simply Red and musicians, such as Elton John, Rod Stewart, k.d. lang, Milton Nascimento, and Jack Johnson, and currently works as a film score composer, as well as a musician at Hans Zimmer's studio, he is best known for being the composer of the Despicable Me franchise. Although primarily a guitarist, he also provided backing vocals live for the Simply Red song "Thrill Me". He also collaborates with film directors Chris Renaud, Pierre Coffin, Kyle Balda, Raja Gosnell, and Cal Brunker.

In 1994, he released a solo album in the United Kingdom called Heitor TP, which featured guest appearance from Mick Hucknall on the track "Manchester". Heitor left Simply Red to concentrate on his solo career. He played guitar and composed additional music for soundtracks like Gladiator, Mission: Impossible 2, The Road to El Dorado, Pearl Harbor, I Am Sam, Spirit: Stallion of the Cimarron, Madagascar, The Simpsons Movie, Madagascar: Escape 2 Africa, Rango, and Cowboys & Aliens.

In 2003, Pereira contributed the song "Remember Me" for the soundtrack for Something's Gotta Give.

In 2006, Heitor Pereira won a Grammy Award for 'Best Instrumental Arrangement Accompanying a Vocalist' on a version of the song "What Are You Doing the Rest of Your Life?" by Chris Botti and Sting.

== Albums ==
- Heitor TP (1987)
- Heitor (1994)
- Untold Stories (2001)

== Film scores ==
Year	Title	Director	Notes	Ref.
2001	Spy Kids	Robert Rodriguez	With John Debney, Danny Elfman, Robert Rodriguez, Los Lobos, Gavin Greenaway and Harry Gregson-Williams	
2001	Riding in Cars with Boys	Penny Marshall	With Hans Zimmer	
2002	11'09"01 September 11	Anthology film with 11 co-directors	With Michael Brook; One of the 11 composers collaborating in this film.	
2002	Dead in the Water	Gustavo Lipsztein	—N/a	
2002	Real Women Have Curves	Patricia Cardoso	—N/a	
2004	Dirty Dancing: Havana Nights	Guy Ferland	—N/a	
2004	Haven	Frank E. Flowers	—N/a	
2005	Madagascar	Eric Darnell; Tom McGrath	Additional music Score composed by Hans Zimmer	
2006	Curious George	Matthew O'Callaghan	Pereira's first score for an animated film	
2006	Ask the Dust	Robert Towne	With Ramin Djawadi	
2006	Blind Dating	James Keach	—N/a	
2006	Two Weeks	Steve Stockman	—N/a	
2007	Suburban Girl	Marc Klein	—N/a	
2007	Illegal Tender	Franc. Reyes	—N/a	
2008	Beverly Hills Chihuahua	Raja Gosnell	—N/a	
2009	The Canyon	Richard Harrah	—N/a	
2009	It's Complicated	Nancy Meyers	With Hans Zimmer	
2010	Curious George 2: Follow That Monkey!	Norton Virgien	Direct-to-video film	
2010	Despicable Me	Chris Renaud; Pierre Coffin	With Pharrell Williams	
2011	From Prada to Nada	Angel Garcia	—N/a	
2011	A Little Bit of Heaven	Nicole Kassell	—N/a	
2011	The Little Engine That Could	Elliot M. Bour	Direct-to-video film	
2011	The Smurfs	Raja Gosnell	—N/a	
2012	Beverly Hills Chihuahua 3: Viva la Fiesta!	Lev L. Spiro	Direct-to-video film	
2013	Despicable Me 2	Chris Renaud; Pierre Coffin	Original songs and themes by Pharrell Williams	
2013	The Smurfs 2	Raja Gosnell	—N/a	
2014	If I Stay	R. J. Cutler	—N/a	
2015	Curious George 3: Back to the Jungle	Phil Weinstein	Direct-to-video film	
2015	Minions	Pierre Coffin; Kyle Balda	—N/a	
2016	The Angry Birds Movie	Fergal Reilly; Clay Kaytis	—N/a	
2017	Despicable Me 3	Pierre Coffin; Kyle Balda	Original songs and themes by Pharrell Williams	
2017	The Nut Job 2: Nutty by Nature	Cal Brunker	—N/a	
2017	Please Stand By	Ben Lewin	—N/a	
2018	Show Dogs	Raja Gosnell	—N/a	
2018	Smallfoot	Karey Kirkpatrick	Original songs by Wayne Kirkpatrick and Karey Kirkpatrick	
2019	Playmobil: The Movie	Lino DiSalvo	Also songwriter with Anne Preven and Stephan Moccio	
2019	The Angry Birds Movie 2	Thurop Van Orman	—N/a	
2021	Paw Patrol: The Movie	Cal Brunker	—N/a	
2021	My Little Pony: A New Generation	Robert Cullen; José Ucha	Original songs by Alan Schmuckler and Michael Mahler	
2022	The Valet	Richard Wong	—N/a	
2022	Minions: The Rise of Gru	Kyle Balda	—N/a	
2022	Puss in Boots: The Last Wish	Joel Crawford	Replaced Henry Jackman; Also songwriter on Fearless Hero with Dan Navarro & Paul Fisher and Por Que Te Vas with Gaby Moreno	
2024	Despicable Me 4	Chris Renaud	Original songs and themes by Pharrell Williams	
2026	Animal Farm	Andy Serkis	Replaced Nitin Sawhney	
2026	The Angry Birds Movie 3	John Rice	—N/a	
