= BuzzFeed =

American internet media and news company

BuzzFeed, Inc.
- Logo used since 2019
- Formerly: BuzzFeed Laboratories (2006–2016)
- Type: Public
- Traded as: Nasdaq: BZFD (Class A)
- ISIN: US12430A1025
- Industry: Online media
- Founded: November 1, 2006; 20 years ago
- Founders: Jonah Peretti; John S. Johnson III
- Headquarters: New York City, New York, United States
- Key people: Byron Allen (chairman and CEO); Dao Nguyen (publisher); Jonah Peretti (head of BuzzFeed AI)
- Products: Entertainment; News
- Revenue: US$185.3 million (2025)
- Operating income: ▲−US$47.886 million (2025)
- Net income: ▲−US$57.3 million (2025)
- Total assets: ▼US$188.139 million (2025)
- Total equity: ▼US$50.1 million (2025)
- Owner: Byron Allen (51%)
- Number of employees: 507 (December 2025)
- Divisions: BuzzFeed Studios; BuzzFeed AI; Tasty
- Subsidiaries: HuffPost
- Website: buzzfeed.com

BuzzFeed, Inc. is an American Internet media, news, and entertainment company with a focus on digital media. Based in New York City, BuzzFeed was founded in 2006 by Jonah Peretti and John S. Johnson III to focus on tracking viral content.

Originally known for online quizzes, "listicles," and pop culture articles, the company has grown into a global media and technology company across several subsidiary publications, providing coverage on a variety of topics including politics, DIY, animals, and business. BuzzFeed generates revenue through native advertising, a strategy that helps increase the likelihood of viewers reading through the content of advertisements.

In late 2011, BuzzFeed hired Ben Smith of Politico as editor-in-chief, to expand the site into long-form journalism and reportage under the BuzzFeed News banner. After years of investment in investigative journalism, by 2021 BuzzFeed News had won the National Magazine Award, the George Polk Award, and the Pulitzer Prize, and was nominated for the Michael Kelly Award. BuzzFeed News later moved to its own domain rather than existing as a section of the main BuzzFeed website. On April 20, 2023, Peretti announced that BuzzFeed would be shuttering BuzzFeed News and focusing its news efforts into HuffPost, laying off about 180 workers.

After initially going public via a special-purpose acquisition company in 2021 with a valuation of $1.5 billion, its stock price and valuation sharply declined to only being worth $37 million by 2024, and the company entered financial difficulties. In 2026 it was announced that the company was set to be purchased by Byron Allen's family office for $120 million. The sale was completed on May 27, 2026.

== History ==
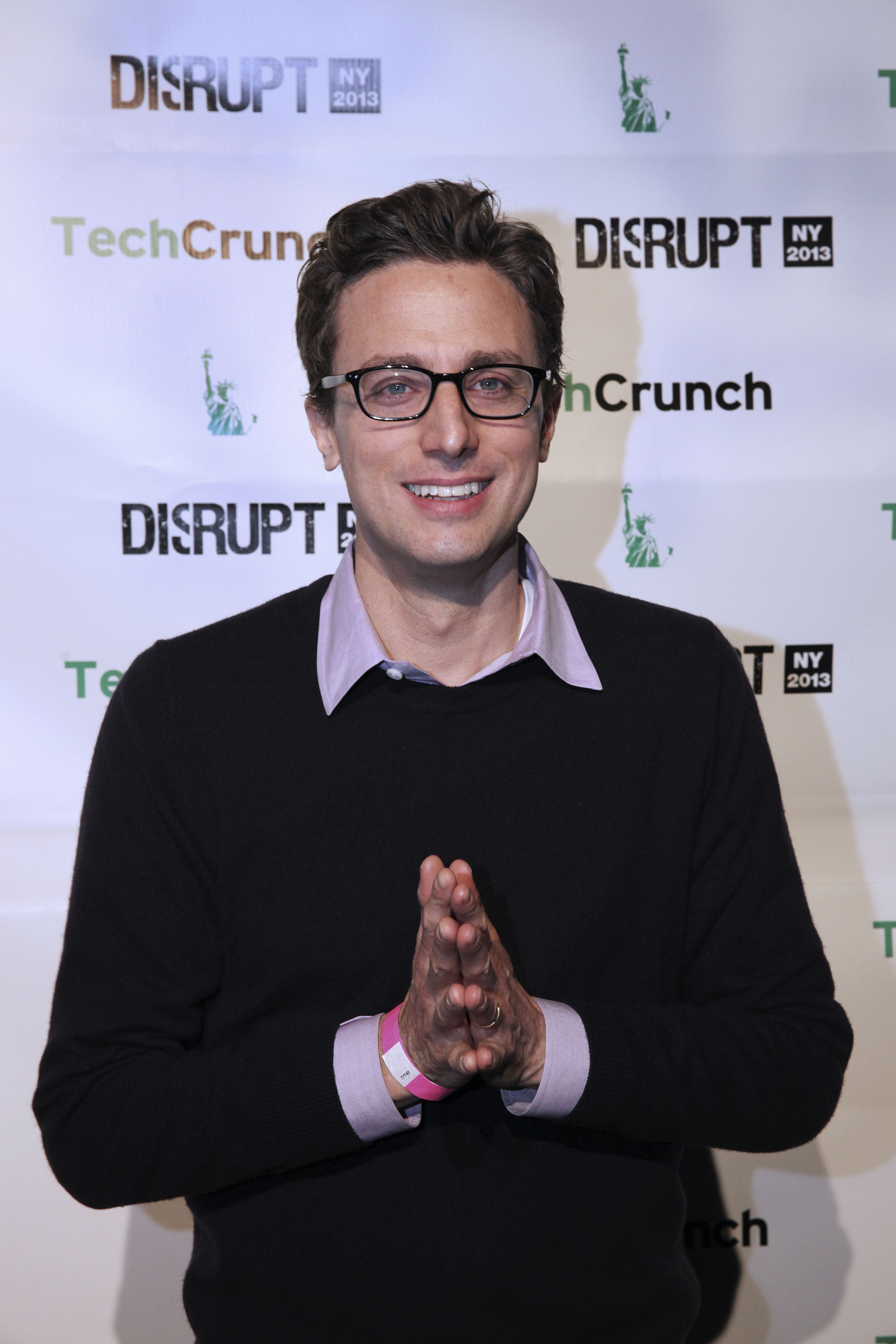
Jonah Peretti founded BuzzFeed in November 2006.

Prior to establishing BuzzFeed, Peretti was director of research and development for the OpenLab at Eyebeam, John Johnson's New York City-based art and technology nonprofit organization, where he experimented with other viral media.

In 2006, while working at the Huffington Post, Peretti started BuzzFeed (originally called BuzzFeed Laboratories) as a side project, in partnership with his former supervisor Johnson. In the beginning, BuzzFeed employed no writers or editors, just an "algorithm to cull stories from around the web that were showing stirrings of virality." The site initially launched an instant messaging client, BuzzBot, which sent users a link to popular content. The messages were sent based on algorithms which examined the links that were being quickly disseminated, scouring through the feeds of hundreds of blogs that were aggregating them. Later, the site began spotlighting the most popular links that BuzzBot found. Peretti hired curators to help describe the content that was popular around the web. In 2011, Peretti hired Politico's Ben Smith, who earlier had achieved much attention as a political blogger, to assemble a news operation in addition to the many aggregated "listicles".

In 2016, BuzzFeed formally separated its news and entertainment content into BuzzFeed News and the newly formed BuzzFeed Entertainment Group, which also includes BuzzFeed Motion Pictures. As of 2016, BuzzFeed had correspondents from 12 countries, and foreign editions in Australia, Brazil, France, Germany, India, Japan, Mexico, Spain, and the United Kingdom. By the end of 2017, BuzzFeed employed around 1,700 employees worldwide, although it announced plans in November of that year to lay off around 100 employees in the US, 45 in the UK, and 100 in France in June 2018.

On January 23, 2019, BuzzFeed notified all employees via memo that there would be an upcoming 15% reduction in workforce affecting the international, web content, and news divisions of the company. The layoffs would affect approximately 200 employees. In 2020, BuzzFeed signed a deal with Universal Television to produce content based on its stories.

Three top BuzzFeed News editors in March 2022 announced that they would be resigning and the newsroom would face voluntary layoffs or job cuts. The cuts came after BuzzFeed investors encouraged Peretti to shut down all of BuzzFeed News, but he refused, CNBC reported. In January 2023, Peretti announced that BuzzFeed would be making a "hard pivot" to AI generated content such as custom quizzes. In May 2023, Peretti announced that AI content would "replace the majority of static content" on the BuzzFeed website.

In March 2026, BuzzFeed revealed that it is still burdened by legacy commitments and it has engaged in "strategic conversations" about relieving its liquidity issues.

On May 27, 2026, BuzzFeed announced that Allen Family Digital had completed its acquisition of approximately 51% of the company's outstanding shares. Byron Allen assumed the roles of chairman and chief executive officer, while Jonah Peretti transitioned to the role of president of BuzzFeed AI.

Following the acquisition, BuzzFeed began a restructuring under Allen with the intention of the company competing with YouTube, 3 divisions were created with artificial intelligence assets being placed under BuzzFeed AI, shows and studio assets (such as Animation Lab) being placed under BuzzFeed Studios and food products being placed under Tasty. (Note: BuzzFeed Studios and Tasty previously operated as sub labels prior to the restructuring.)

Under the new ownership, BuzzFeed announced plans in July 2026 to eliminate approximately 180 staff and contract positions, representing about 35% of its workforce. The reductions affected BuzzFeed, HuffPost and Tasty. The company said the restructuring was intended to put the business on a path to profitable and sustainable growth.

=== Funding ===
Despite reaching annual revenues in the hundreds of million of dollars at its peak, BuzzFeed has been consistently loss-making since its inception.

BuzzFeed raised $3.5 million in 2008 through Hearst Ventures and SoftBank. In 2011, BuzzFeed ran more than 100 social media campaigns, resulting in their revenue tripling compared to 2010. In January 2012, BuzzFeed announced that it had earned $15.5 million in funding from New Enterprise Associates, Lerer Ventures, Hearst Interactive Media, SoftBank, and RRE Capital to expand the site's content. Later, in October 2012, BuzzFeed ran sponsored content for the Obama administration leading to an increase in ad revenue. By January 2013, BuzzFeed announced that New Enterprise Associates had raised $19.3 million. The company was reported to be profitable in 2013.

In 2014, it was reported that BuzzFeed had passed $100 million in revenue. In August 2014, BuzzFeed raised $50 million from the venture capital firm Andreessen Horowitz, more than doubling previous rounds of funding. The site was reportedly valued at around $850 million by Andreessen Horowitz. BuzzFeed generates its advertising revenue through native advertising that matches its editorial content, and does not rely on banner ads. BuzzFeed also uses its familiarity with social media to target conventional advertising through other channels, such as Facebook. In December 2014, growth equity firm General Atlantic acquired $50 million in secondary stock of the company.

In August 2015, NBCUniversal made a $200 million equity investment in BuzzFeed. Along with plans to hire more journalists to build a more prominent "investigative" unit, BuzzFeed planned on hiring journalists around the world and plans to open outposts in India, Germany, Mexico, and Japan. It planned on hiring staff for its UK bureau, its rapidly-expanding motion picture unit and its food-themed business, Tasty. NBCUniversal invested an additional $200 million in 2016 after the two companies had collaborated on many projects, namely the Rio Olympics. The companies planned to work together to market themselves to advertisers. Together, Comcast and its NBCUniversal subsidiary own about a third of BuzzFeed. BuzzFeed has said that it intends to stay independent.

After laying off 100 employees in 2017, BuzzFeed laid off 200 of its employees in 2019 to help facilitate growth despite raising revenue by 15% from 2017 to 2018. Facebook began funding two BuzzFeed News shows in 2019 for Watch. Because of the COVID-19 pandemic, on March 25, 2020, BuzzFeed announced in an internal memo that it would cut employee salaries on a sliding scale of 5% (lowest income bracket) up to 25% (highest income bracket). Peretti said he would not be taking a salary until the end of the pandemic. Many staffers expressed relief at this announcement as there were no layoffs. On May 13, 2020, the company shut down its divisions in the UK and Australia, furloughing 10 news staff in the UK as well as four in its Australian outpost.

According to a news from June 24, 2021 on Variety, BuzzFeed, valued at $1.5 billion through a SPAC deal, is to go public and acquire Complex Networks for $300 million.

BuzzFeed raised $16.2M in its latest funding round, which was Post IPO round held on Dec 03, 2021.

In 2025, BuzzFeed had a net loss of $57.3 million, noting that it did not have enough resources to fund its cash obligations for 2026, stating that "there is substantial doubt about the Company's ability to continue as a going concern."

For 2025, BuzzFeed reported revenue of $185.3 million, a 2.4% decrease from the previous year. Advertising revenue declined 2.8% to $91.7 million, while content revenue increased 9.4% to $37.0 million. Commerce and other revenue fell 8.3% to $56.5 million. Within these categories, programmatic advertising revenue increased 7.4% to $69.6 million, and studio revenue nearly tripled to $16.1 million.

=== Acquisitions and stock listing ===
BuzzFeed's first acquisition was in 2012 when the company purchased Kingfish Labs, a startup founded by Rob Fishman, initially focused on optimizing Facebook ads.

In October 2014, BuzzFeed announced its next acquisition, Torando Labs, which would become BuzzFeed's first data-engineering team.

On November 19, 2020, BuzzFeed announced that they would acquire HuffPost in a stock deal that made Verizon Media minority shareholder in BuzzFeed.

In June 2021, BuzzFeed announced its plans to go public via a special-purpose acquisition company (SPAC) and planned to acquire Complex Networks. After initially listing on Nasdaq at $10 a share, valuing the company at around $1.5 billion, the share price subsequently declined to under $1 by 2023, leading to a delisting notice by Nasdaq in May 2023, requiring them to raise the share price above $1 within 180 days or risk being removed from the exchange. Once the deadline for this notice passed in November 2023 with the stock price still below $1, they were given a further 180 days until May 2024. By January 2024, the stock price of the company had declined 98% since its initial listing, with the entire company now only worth around $37 million, and the company was significantly burdened with debt. In May 2024, BuzzFeed implemented a 4:1 reverse stock split, bringing them above the $1 a share threshold.

In May 2024, activist investor Vivek Ramaswamy acquired a 7.7% stake in BuzzFeed, making him the fourth-largest shareholder, which he later increased to 8.37%. Ramaswamy said that he thought the company was undervalued, and that he wanted to shift the company's political leanings such as by hiring right-wing media personalities. Elizabeth Lopatto, writing in The Verge, called his effort futile, as voting power in BuzzFeed is primarily in Class B shares, which have 50 times the voting power of the common Class A shares Ramaswamy had purchased. 90% of Class B shares are held by founder Peretti and close associates, meaning that Ramaswamy has little voting power despite his large shareholding.

By March 2026 the stock price had fallen under $1 again to around $0.66-0.75 a share, and Nasdaq again threatened to delist the stock.

=== Divestitures ===
In February 2024, BuzzFeed announced the sale of Complex to NTWRK, a livestream shopping platform, even as it would retain some popular franchises. At the same time, it reportedly considered selling Tasty, a social media food brand. The moves marked a retreat for the company after its December 2021 public listing done to finance acquisitions and came during a difficult period for media companies. It also announced layoffs. In July 2024, the company sold travel-brand Bring Me! to media publisher LOST iN. In December 2024, BuzzFeed sold First We Feast, which produces the show Hot Ones, for $82.5 million to a consortium of investors. According to Reuters, in early 2024 British media group The Independent reportedly discussed a multi-year agreement to acquire control of BuzzFeed and HuffPost's operations in the UK and Ireland.

== Film ==
In 2014, BuzzFeed launched a motion picture division, initially led by Ze Frank. Pulp Fiction producer Michael Shamberg and comedian-director Jordan Peele joined in advisory roles. In 2016, Jim Parsons was cast as BuzzFeed reporter Matt Stopera in what was to be BuzzFeed's first narrative film, Brother Orange. The movie, based on a viral BuzzFeed article, was eventually released as a documentary in 2025. BuzzFeed Motion Picture Group, later renamed BuzzFeed Studios, releases BuzzFeed's films. In 2024, Richard Alan Reid became president of BuzzFeed Studios.

=== Narrative films ===
Year	Title	Director(s)	Writer(s)	Distributor
2021	Stop and Go	Mallory Everton and Stephen Meek	Whitney Call and Mallory Everton	Decal Releasing
2021	The End of Us	Steven Kanter and Henry Loevner		Saban Films
2022	Book of Love	Analeine Cal y Mayor	David Quantick, Analeine Cal y Mayor	Amazon Prime Video
2022	My Fake Boyfriend	Rose Troche	Luke Albright, Greg Boaldin, Joe Wanjai Ross	Lionsgate
2022	1Up	Kyle Newman	Julia Yorks	Amazon Studios
2022	Fall	Scott Mann	Scott Mann, Jonathan Frank	Lionsgate
2023	The Black Demon	Adrian Grünberg	Boise Esquerra (screenplay); Carlos Cisco (story)	The Avenue
2023	One True Loves	Andy Fickman	Taylor Jenkins Reid, Alex Jenkins Reid (screenplay); Taylor Jenkins Reid (book)	The Avenue
2023	Puppy Love	Richard Alan Reid, Nick Fabiano	Greg Glienna, Peter Stass, Kirsten Guenther, Dan Scheinkman, Richard Alan Reid	Lionsgate
2023	Dear David	John McPhail	Mike Van Waes (screenplay); Mike Van Waes, Evan Turner (story); Adam Ellis (book)	Lionsgate
2023	EXmas	Dan Steele	Jonah Feingold	Amazon Freevee
2025	The Ritual	David Midell	Enrico Natalie, David Midell	XYZ Films
2025	F*** Marry Kill	Laura Murphy	Ivan Diaz, Dan Schinkman, Meghan Brown	Lionsgate
2026	K-Pops!	Anderson .Paak		Aura Entertainment
2026	Girls Like Girls	Hayley Kiyoko	Hayley Kiyoko, Stefanie Scott	Focus Features
TBD	Basic	Chelsea Devantez		TBD
TBD	Egg Baby	Natalia Anderson	Natalia Anderson, Allison Friedman	Amazon MGM Studios
TBD	The Girlfriend	Natalie Morales	Glenn Howerton, Richard Appel	TBD
TBD	Whodunnit	Nora Kirkpatrick	Nora Kirkpatrick, Jessica Kravitz, Chelsea Catalanotto	TBD

=== Documentary films ===
Year	Title	Director	Distributor
2025	Brother Orange	Abe Forman-Greenwald	Gravitas Ventures

== Content ==
BuzzFeed produces daily content, in which the work of staff reporters, contributors, syndicated cartoon artists, and its community are featured. Popular formats on the website include lists, videos, and quizzes. The style of such content inspired the parody website ClickHole. While BuzzFeed initially was focused exclusively on such viral content, according to The New York Times, "it added more traditional content, building a track record for delivering breaking news and deeply reported articles" in the years up to 2014. In that year, BuzzFeed deleted over 4000 early posts, "apparently because, as time passed, they looked stupider and stupider", as observed by The New Yorker.

BuzzFeed consistently ranked at the top of NewsWhip's "Facebook Publisher Rankings" from December 2013 to April 2014, until The Huffington Post entered the position.

=== News ===
BuzzFeed's news division began in December 2011 with the appointment of Ben Smith as editor-in-chief. In 2013, Pulitzer Prize winner Mark Schoofs of ProPublica was hired as head of investigative reporting. By 2016, BuzzFeed had 20 investigative journalists. Chief executive Jonah Peretti announced the BuzzFeed News division would close on April 20, 2023.

=== Video ===
BuzzFeed Video, BuzzFeed Motion Picture's flagship YouTube channel, produces original content. Its production studio and team are based in Los Angeles. Since hiring Ze Frank in 2012, BuzzFeed Video has produced several video series, including "The Try Guys". They also created You Do You and its spinoff Unfortunately Ashly. In August 2014, the company announced a new division, BuzzFeed Motion Pictures, which may produce feature-length films. As of September 1, 2021, BuzzFeed Video's YouTube channel had garnered more than 17.4 billion views and more than 20.3 million subscribers. BuzzFeed later announced that YouTube signed on for two feature-length series to be created by BuzzFeed Motion Pictures, entitled Broke and Squad Wars.

=== Podcasts ===
BuzzFeed started an in-house podcasting team in 2015, through which the podcasts Another Round and Internet Explorer were developed and launched. In September 2018, BuzzFeed shut down its podcast department and laid off the staff due to a lack of desired ad revenue. It cancelled most of its podcasts, including See Something, Say Something. In late January 2019, they fired 200 staff across the company and cancelled the remaining podcast, Thirst Aid Kit.

Former podcasts

- Another Round
- Internet Explorer
- The News
- See Something, Say Something
- Thirst Aid Kit
- Reporting To You
- Rerun
- The Tell Show
- Women of the Hour

=== Community ===
On July 17, 2012, humor website McSweeney's Internet Tendency published a satirical piece entitled "Suggested BuzzFeed Articles", prompting BuzzFeed to create many of the suggestions. BuzzFeed listed McSweeney's as a "Community Contributor". The post subsequently received more than 350,000 page views, prompted BuzzFeed to ask for user submissions, and received media attention. Subsequently, the website launched the "Community" section in May 2013 to enable users to submit content. Users initially are limited to publishing only one post per day, but may increase their submission capacity by raising their "Cat Power", described on the BuzzFeed website as "an official measure of your rank in BuzzFeed's Community." A user's Cat Power increases as they achieve greater prominence on the site.

In January 2017, BuzzFeed's user-generated community content accumulated 100 million views.

In February 2019, BuzzFeed News voted to unionize, following major layoffs. A dispute between BuzzFeed's upper executives and the union began when the executives failed to show up to a meeting.

=== Technology and social media ===
BuzzFeed receives the majority of its traffic by creating content that is shared on social media websites. BuzzFeed works by judging their content on how viral it will become, operating in a "continuous feedback loop" where all of its articles and videos are used as input for its sophisticated data operation. The site continues to test and track their custom content with an in-house team of data scientists and an external-facing "social dashboard". Using an algorithm dubbed "Viral Rank" created by Jonah Peretti and Duncan Watts, the company uses this formula to let editors, users, and advertisers try many different ideas, which maximizes distribution. Staff writers are ranked by views on an internal leaderboard. In 2014, BuzzFeed received 75% of its views from links on social media outlets such as Pinterest, Twitter, and Facebook.

=== Tasty ===
BuzzFeed's video series on comfort food, Tasty, is made for Facebook, where it has 100 million followers as of December 2019. The channel has substantially more views than BuzzFeed's dedicated food site. The channel included five spinoff segments: "Tasty Junior"—which eventually spun off into its own page, "Tasty Happy Hour" (alcoholic beverages), "Tasty Fresh", "Tasty Vegetarian", and "Tasty Story"—which has celebrities making and discussing their own recipes. Tasty has also released a cookbook.

The company also operates international versions of Tasty. Tasty has also released its own kitchenware, which includes several products such as spatulas, cooking sheets, and mixing bowls. These products are sold in collaboration with Walmart.Tasty also sells their "One Top", which is a smart induction cooktop, as well as "Tasty Kits", which are kits that contains cooking items for cooking at home.

In light of the COVID-19 pandemic in 2020, "Tasty" streamed the Saturday Night Seder, an online Passover Seder that featured many celebrities and benefited the CDC Foundation.

=== Worth It ===
Since 2016, Tasty also sponsors a show named Worth It starring Steven Lim, Andrew Ilnyckyj, and Adam Bianchi. In each episode, the trio visit three different food places with three drastically different price points in one food category. Steven Lim also stars in BuzzFeed Blue's "Worth It – Lifestyle" videos. The series is similar, in that three items or experiences are valued from different companies, each at their different price point, but focus on material items and experiences, such as plane seats, hotel rooms, and haircuts. Lim left BuzzFeed in 2019 to start his own production company Watcher.

=== BuzzFeed Unsolved ===
BuzzFeed Unsolved was the most successful web series on BuzzFeed's BuzzFeed Multiplayer. The show was created by Ryan Bergara and features both him and Shane Madej (who replaced original co-host Brent Bennett). The show covers some of history's most famous unsolved mysteries, presenting them and the theories that surround them in a comedic manner. In some episodes, they visit the places involved with the mystery. Many of these episodes focus on the supernatural or paranormal and often include the pair ghost hunting during the investigations. In late 2019, Bergara and Madej started their own digital production company, Watcher Entertainment, with Worth It's Steven Lim; however, the two continued collaborating with BuzzFeed to produce BuzzFeed Unsolved until November 2021. The spiritual successor to BuzzFeed Unsolved is Ghost Files, a documentary entertainment web series by Watcher Entertainment that was first released on September 23, 2022.

=== The Try Guys ===
The Try Guys are a trio of friends (Eugene Lee Yang, Zach Kornfeld, Keith Habersberger, and formerly Ned Fulmer) who put themselves in different, and at times, compromising situations and record the results. In June 2018, the four left BuzzFeed and created their own independent channel, also titled "The Try Guys".

=== Night In/Night Out ===
Night In/Night Out was a series run by Ned and Ariel Fulmer. This show features the couple on two different dates, one at home featuring a homemade meal (using a BuzzFeed Tasty Recipe) and one at a restaurant in the Los Angeles area. Each episode focuses on one particular meal, such as baked salmon or hamburgers. At the end of each episode, Ned and Ariel would decide whether they preferred the home-cooked meal (and the accompanying ambiance and price tag) or the meal at the restaurant. However, the couple left BuzzFeed with the Try Guys in 2018, and the series was subsequently canceled.

=== Short-form animation ===
Around 2017, BuzzFeed launched Animation Lab with a focus on short-form animation content that is posted on platforms such as Instagram, TikTok and later YouTube and Twitter. The studio has launched 30 projects during its existence, 4 of which have since been focused on due to finding success (Weird Helga, The Good Advice Cupcake, The Land of Boggs, and Chikn Nuggit), which as of 2021 had a combined total of over 17 million followers.

== Notable stories ==
=== "The dress" ===
The most interesting thing to me is that it traveled. It went from New York media circle-jerk Twitter to international. And you could see it in my Twitter notifications because people started having conversations in, like, Spanish and Portuguese and then Japanese and Chinese and Thai and Arabic. It was amazing to watch this move from a local thing to, like, a massive international phenomenon.

— Cates Holderness

In February 2015, a post resulting in a debate over the color of an item of clothing from BuzzFeed's Tumblr editor Cates Holderness garnered more than 28 million views in one day, setting a record for most concurrent visitors to a BuzzFeed post. Holderness had shown the picture to other members of the site's social media team, who immediately began arguing about the dress colors among themselves. After creating a simple poll for users of the site, she left work and took the subway back to her Brooklyn home. When she got off the train and checked her telephone, it was overwhelmed by the messages on various sites. "I couldn't open Twitter because it kept crashing. I thought somebody had died, maybe. I didn't know what was going on." Later in the evening the page set a new record at BuzzFeed for concurrent visitors, which reached 673,000 at its peak.

=== Watermelon stunt ===
On April 8, 2016, two BuzzFeed interns created a live stream on Facebook, during which rubber bands were wrapped one by one around a watermelon until the pressure caused it to explode. The Daily Dot compared it to something from America's Funniest Home Videos or by the comedian Gallagher, and "just as stupid-funny, but with incredible immediacy and zero production costs". The video is seen as part of Facebook's strategy to shift to live video, Facebook Live, to counter the rise of Snapchat and Periscope among a younger audience.

== Criticism ==
=== Plagiarism ===
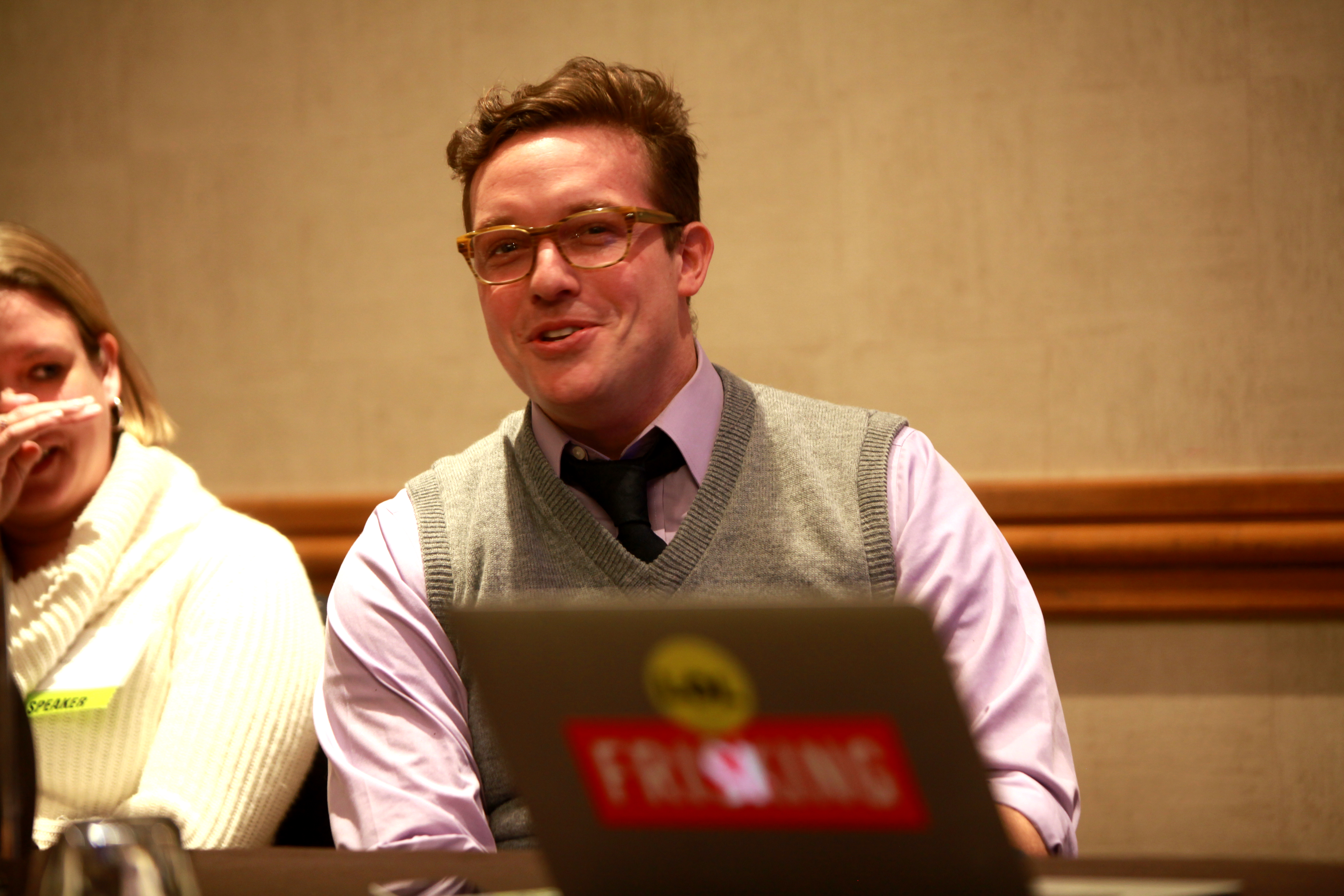
Benny Johnson was fired from BuzzFeed in July 2014 for plagiarism.

BuzzFeed has been accused of plagiarizing original content from competitors from the online and offline press. In June 2012, Gawker's Adrian Chen observed that one of BuzzFeed's most popular writers—Matt Stopera—frequently copied and pasted "chunks of text into lists without attribution." In March 2013, The Atlantic Wire also reported several "listicles" had apparently been copied from Reddit and other websites. In July 2014, BuzzFeed writer Benny Johnson was accused of multiple instances of plagiarism. Two anonymous Twitter users chronicled Johnson attributing work that was not his own, but "directly lift[ed] from other reporters, Wikipedia, and Yahoo! Answers", all without credit. BuzzFeed editor Ben Smith initially defended Johnson, calling him a "deeply original writer". Days later, Smith acknowledged that Johnson had plagiarized the work of others 40 times and announced that Johnson had been fired, apologizing to BuzzFeed readers. "Plagiarism, much less copying unchecked facts from Wikipedia or other sources, is an act of disrespect to the reader", Smith said. "We are deeply embarrassed and sorry to have misled you." In total, 41 instances of plagiarism were found and corrected. In 2016, claims surfaced of the YouTube channel BuzzFeedVideo stealing ideas and content from other creators.

BuzzFeed has been the subject of multiple copyright infringement lawsuits, for both using content it had no rights to and encouraging its proliferation without attributing its sources: one for an individual photographer's photograph, and another for nine celebrity photographs from a single photography company.

In June 2020, BuzzFeed News senior reporter Ryan Broderick was fired after it was revealed he had "plagiarized or misattributed information in at least 11 of his articles."

=== Reputation as a news site ===
In October 2014, a Pew Research Center survey found that in the United States, BuzzFeed was viewed as an unreliable source by the majority of people, regardless of political affiliation. Adweek noted that most respondents had not heard of BuzzFeed, and many users do not consider BuzzFeed a news site. In a subsequent Pew report based on 2014 surveys, BuzzFeed was among the least trusted sources by millennials. A 2016 study by the Columbia Journalism Review found readers less likely to trust a story (originally published in Mother Jones) that appeared to originate on BuzzFeed than the same article on The New Yorker website. In a 2017 survey among US readers, BuzzFeed was voted the second least trustworthy source among American readers, with Occupy Democrats being lower-ranked.

In January 2017, BuzzFeed again faced widespread criticism from many journalists and media officials, along with then-President elect Donald Trump, for publishing 35 pages of unverified memos in full, known as the Steele dossier. In a highly publicized press conference following the publication of the memos, Trump referred to BuzzFeed as a "failing pile of garbage". Among the unverified claims in the memos was one that stated Trump's attorney Michael Cohen had met in August 2016 with Russian officials in Prague, Czech Republic, a claim that Cohen has vehemently denied.

On January 18, 2019, Robert Mueller's office disputed a BuzzFeed report stating that Trump instructed Michael Cohen to lie to Congress. A spokesman for Mueller's office characterized the BuzzFeed report as "not accurate".

=== Unpaid contributors ===
Matthew Perpetua, BuzzFeed's director of quizzes, published a blog post in January 2019 after being laid off, revealing that many of the site's most popular quizzes were created by unpaid contributors. Perpetua identified one college student in Michigan in particular as "the second-highest traffic driver worldwide." The student, Rachel McMahon, said that until she saw Perpetua's blog post, she never knew that her quizzes were so significant for BuzzFeed's traffic. The quizzes made an estimated $3.8 million for the media company. According to the Detroit Free Press, she had never asked BuzzFeed about getting paid and the only material goods she received from them were four $30 Amazon gift certificates, a BuzzFeed sweatshirt and T-shirt and several water bottles.

=== Advertiser influence on editorial ===
In April 2015, BuzzFeed drew scrutiny after Gawker observed the publication had deleted two posts that criticized advertisers. One of the posts criticized Dove soap (manufactured by Unilever), while another criticized Hasbro. Both companies advertise with BuzzFeed. Ben Smith apologized in a memo to staff for his actions: "I blew it. Twice in the past couple of months, I've asked editors—over their better judgment and without any respect to our standards or process—to delete recently published posts from the site. Both involved the same thing: my overreaction to questions we've been wrestling with about the place of personal opinion pieces on our site. I reacted impulsively when I saw the posts and I was wrong to do that. We've reinstated both with a brief note". Days later, Arabelle Sicardi, one of the authors of the deleted posts, resigned. An internal review by the company found three additional posts deleted for being critical of products or advertisements (by Microsoft, Pepsi, and Unilever).

In 2016, the Advertising Standards Authority of the United Kingdom ruled that BuzzFeed broke the UK advertising rules for failing to make it clear that an article on "14 Laundry Fails We've All Experienced" that promoted Dylon was an online advertorial paid for by the brand. Although the ASA agreed with BuzzFeed's defense that links to the piece from its homepage and search results clearly labelled the article as "sponsored content", this failed to take into account that individuals might link to the story directly, ruling that the labeling "was not sufficient to make clear that the main content of the web page was an advertorial and that editorial content was therefore retained by the advertiser".

=== Hiring practices ===
In February 2016, Scaachi Koul, a Senior Writer for BuzzFeed Canada, tweeted a request for pitches stating that BuzzFeed was "...looking for mostly non-white non-men" followed by "If you are a white man upset that we are looking mostly for non-white non-men I don't care about you go write for Maclean's." When confronted, she followed with the tweet "White men are still permitted to pitch, I will read it, I will consider it. I'm just less interested because, ugh, men." In response to the tweets that were deemed racist and sexist, Koul began receiving a barrage of hate comments and threats of violence. Sarmishta Subramanian, a former colleague of Koul's, writing for Maclean's, condemned the reaction to the tweets, and stated that Koul's request for diversity was appropriate. Subramanian said that her provocative approach raised concerns of tokenism that might hamper BuzzFeed's stated goals. In January 2019, BuzzFeed announced that it would cut its workforce by 15%. In July 2019 BuzzFeed announced that it would voluntarily recognize an employee union.

=== Ideology ===
BuzzFeed states in its editorial guide that "we firmly believe that for a number of issues, including civil rights, women's rights, anti-racism, and LGBT equality, there are not two sides." The Week's correspondent Ryan Cooper and American Enterprise Institute's senior fellow Timothy P. Carney at the Washington Examiner raised questions about whether BuzzFeed undermines its credibility by taking sides on political issues. In June 2015, BuzzFeed and websites like the Huffington Post and Mashable temporarily changed the theme of their social media avatars to rainbow colors to celebrate same-sex marriage being ruled constitutional in the United States.

In June 2016, the left-leaning media watchdog Fairness and Accuracy in Reporting found that in 100 BuzzFeed stories about Barack Obama, 65 were positive, 34 were neutral, and one was critical. The report called BuzzFeed's coverage of Obama "creepy" and "almost uniformly uncritical and often sycophantic." BuzzFeed had partnered with Obama on a get-out-the-vote campaign. During the same month, BuzzFeed cancelled an advertising agreement with the Republican National Committee over what BuzzFeed founder Jonah Peretti called "offensive remarks" made by Donald Trump. Peretti said: "We certainly don't like to turn away revenue that funds all the important work we do across the company. However, in some cases we must make business exceptions: we don't run cigarette ads because they are hazardous to our health, and we won't accept Trump ads for the exact same reason."

In January 2017, BuzzFeed released what became known as the "Steele dossier", an uncorroborated private intelligence report that alleges several salacious accusations of Trump. Margaret Sullivan at The Washington Post wrote of the release: "It's a bad idea, and always has been, to publish unverified smears." David Graham at The Atlantic called it "an abdication of the basic responsibility of journalism." NBC's Chuck Todd called the release of the document "fake news". Ben Smith defended the decision to release the document from accusations that it was done out of partisanship, arguing that the dossier is of "obvious central public importance."

== Awards and recognition ==
In 2017, BuzzFeed won Webby Awards for Best News App and Best Interview/Talk Show (for Another Round), and president Greg Coleman was named Publishing Executive of the Year by Digiday.

In 2018, staff of BuzzFeed news was a finalist for a Pulitzer Prize in their international reporting category for their article that "proved that operatives with apparent ties to Vladimir Putin have engaged in a targeted killing campaign against his perceived enemies on British and American soil". BuzzFeed later won a Pulitzer Prize in 2021 in the international reporting category for an investigative series about the Xinjiang re-education camps.

== See also ==
- Mashable
- Mic
- The Take
- Upworthy
- Vice Media
- Vox Media
