= Stopera (surname) =

Stopera is a surname. Notable people with the surname include:

- Andrew Stopera (born 1997), American curler
- Bill Stopera (born 1968), American curler
- Matt Stopera, American journalist
