= Dear David =

2023 American film by John McPhail

- Theatrical release poster
- Directed by: John McPhail
- Screenplay by: Mike Van Waes
- Story by: Mike Van Waes; Evan Turner
- Based on: "Dear David" by Adam Ellis
- Produced by: Richard Alan Reid; Michael Philip; Jason Moring; Naysun Alae-Carew; Charlotte Walsh
- Starring: Augustus Prew; Andrea Bang; René Escobar Jr.; Cameron Nicoll; Justin Long
- Cinematography: Stephen Whitehead
- Edited by: Glenn Garland; David Arthur
- Music by: Tommy Reilly; Roddy Hart
- Production company: BuzzFeed Studios
- Distributed by: Lionsgate Films
- Release date: October 13, 2023
- Running time: 95 minutes
- Country: United States
- Language: English

Dear David (Note: Marketed with the subtitle The Haunting of Adam Ellis.) is a 2023 American supernatural horror film directed by John McPhail, based on Adam Ellis's Twitter thread of the same name. It stars Augustus Prew, with Andrea Bang, René Escobar Jr., Cameron Nicoll, and Justin Long in supporting roles. Produced by BuzzFeed Studios, the film follows BuzzFeed employee Ellis (Prew), as his attempt to retaliate against online trolls results in a haunting from a demon-possessed spirit.

Dear David was released in theaters and to streaming and digital formats on October 13, 2023, by Lionsgate Films. The film was critically panned by critics, who criticized the writing, pacing, lack of scares, and characters. Some even calling it an,"unintentional comedy".

== Plot ==
In 1996, David gets bullied over a crude drawing on instant messaging, and retaliates against them. In 2017, two teenagers enter the late David's chat room, trolling him. After asking a third question about their future cause of death, the teenager gets killed later that night.

At BuzzFeed, Adam heeds his boss Bryce's request to create "authentic original content". Adam retaliates against trolls; David calls him "mean", which Adam ignores. He hallucinates David on a rocking chair after seeing it move on its own, continuing with a vision of David and his past life. Evelyn encourages Adam to get sleep, but he instead researches "Dear David" and paranormal activity. Adam encounters David in a dream and asks who he is, with David answering he's "just a follower". In the next night, Adam moves to a unit upstairs in the same apartment complex, however his hallucinations persist.

Everyone at BuzzFeed celebrates the success of the Dear David thread. Bryce tells Adam to add multimedia. After hesitating, Adam makes the Dear David story interactive by adding a vote on what to do if David appears again; an exorcism was chosen. Trolls continue to berate Adam, who claps back. On an early morning, Adam asks what David wants with him, later waking up with a nosebleed after David slams a typewriter at his face last night. While hunting for David, he encounters Kyle, who comforts him. Adam recounts his situation to Kyle, who resents him for his unresponsiveness, eventually leaving him in disappointment. Adam later posts that David may want him dead. After initially ignoring the unknown caller, Adam answers—the caller has his voice. At night, he gets dragged to where David is shown disturbing photos. His father scolds him for this, after which David chokes him. Linda kills David.

A representation of David is drawn the next day with half a head. Bryce proposes a worldwide expansion of Dear David, which Adam reluctantly agrees to. He calls Kyle to help track the owner of David's handle; he agrees despite privacy concerns. A woman visits Adam recalling his experience with David, concluding that David may be connected to Adam. He visits Phyllis, who cites another connected case: that of "Loopy Linda". Adam watches her video, realizing her actions match what happened to David, who may be possessed. Adam goes to the hospital where David was admitted, finding he is already dead. He secretly searches for David's file, discovering his body went missing. Adam goes inside Dr. Landers' home to find her, but finds Linda hanging by the stairs.

Adam dozes off, calling Kyle in a dream while cutting himself. Evelyn chides Adam for his responses (which he did not send) and deserts him. Kyle tells Adam that David's handle doesn't exist, and to move on. A list sent by Norris angers Adam, not realizing it said "be yourself" instead of "kill yourself". Bryce recommends a break for Adam, whose reputation and credibility decline. At Adam's apartment, he has a mental breakdown, and accidentally asks a third question to David, losing control, instigating a fire; he sees a vision of people criticizing him. As the complex burns, Evelyn and Kyle visit him in worry after Adam fails to answer their calls. After their reassuring remarks, Adam successfully kills David while escaping the complex with them. They apologize for dismissing Adam's claims of being haunted—Adam promises to be more open.

Meanwhile, Chloe, one of the trolls, gets possessed and continuously smashes her head on the table.

== Cast ==
- Augustus Prew as Adam Ellis, A self-absorbed cartoonist, BuzzFeed employee, and writer living in an apartment in Astoria, Queens, who gets defensive with online trolls, and sometimes neglects his partner and friends in favor of chasing viral internet clout, and becomes haunted by the ghost of a child after rudely responding to an online troll.
- Andrea Bang as Evelyn, Adam’s supportive co-worker and loyal best friend.
- Justin Long as Bryce, Adam’s pushy, unscrupulous boss at BuzzFeed who pressures him to turn his real-life paranormal haunting into interactive multimedia content for clicks.
- René Escobar Jr. as Kyle, Adam’s estranged boyfriend who grows frustrated as Adam's behavior continues to spiral.
- Cameron Nicoll as Dear David, The ghost of a young boy who faced online cyberbullying in the 90's, and now haunts and targets people who engage in cyberbullying or leave malicious online comments.
- Rachel Wilson as Linda, David's mother
- David Tompa as Fred, David's father.
- Tricia Black as Norris, A skeptical BuzzFeed colleague reacting to the madness of the office viral craze.
- Aviva Mongillo as Chloe, an internet troll.

== Production ==
=== Development ===
Dear David was based on a Twitter thread created by former BuzzFeed writer Adam Ellis in which he describes his encounter with a ghost. The story was updated between August 7 and December 12, 2017, and went viral online, gaining Ellis over 1 million followers on Twitter. In February 2018, Ellis left BuzzFeed for independent ventures, leaving the story on hiatus. On June 6, 2018, BuzzFeed Studios announced its plan to adapt the story into a feature film, with Mike Van Waes writing the screenplay. In an interview, Ellis said his story was based on actual events and that he had "never been interested in convincing anyone that ghosts are real – I just wanted to tell my story." In November 2018, New Line Cinema acquired the rights to the story.

In July 2020, BuzzFeed Studios and Lionsgate Films announced a partnership to produce and distribute a number of feature films. In November 2021, BuzzFeed and Lionsgate acquired the rights to the story from New Line Cinema and hired John McPhail to direct.

=== Casting ===
In January 2022, Justin Long, Augustus Prew, and Andrea Bang were confirmed to star.

=== Filming ===
Production took place in Toronto, Canada, and wrapped in December 2021.

=== Post-production ===
McPhail, in an interview with Screen Rant, stated that practical effects were extensively used to "make everything feel just that little bit more real". One such example is the blood rig on the knife, so it's cutting across and blood would appear.

== Release ==
Originally, the film was set for a 2022 release, however Lionsgate pushed back the release date to October 13, 2023.

== Reception ==
On the review aggregator website Rotten Tomatoes, 10% of 29 critics' reviews are positive, with an average rating of 3.9/10. Metacritic, which uses a weighted average, assigned the film a score of 26 out of 100, based on 5 critics, indicating "generally unfavorable" reviews.

Meagan Navarro of Bloody Disgusting also gave a rating of two-and-a-half stars out of five, who disliked the pacing (calling it "a rather sleepy affair"), lack of scares in favor of internal character conflict, later telling readers to revisit the original Twitter thread "for genuine frights". Kristy Puchko, in her review for Mashable, stated that the film "plays like a bad nightmare", further criticizing the lack of coherence and shock value.

In more negative reviews, Tomris Laffly of TheWrap called Dear David "a dull horror film that's anything but scary." In a one out of four star review on RogerEbert.com, Monica Castillo stated that "something is lost in moving Dear David from its native digital platform," negatively comparing it against Zola, a 2020 movie also adapted from Twitter. David Ehrlich, on a review published by IndieWire gave a grade of D+ and wrote "Alas, this low-rent, no-energy, seen-it-all-before genre wank left me absolutely terrified of returning to an era when micro-blogged cries for help could last for half a year and run the length of a novella."
