= Coca-Cola Refreshing Filmmaker's Award =

Award

Debuted in 1998, the Coca-Cola Refreshing Films Red Ribbon Award is an award given out to the student filmmaker—or pair of student filmmakers as of 2026—who wins the annual Coca-Cola Refreshing Films contest. In the contest, current students or recent graduates from participating film schools across the United States submit entries of original scripts following specific themes provided each year by the contest organizers. However, all scripts are meant to highlight how Coca-Cola serves as an integral part of the movie-going experience. Eight semifinalist scripts are selected by a group of judges who then provide feedback, and the semifinalist teams rework their scripts and create storyboards. As of the 2026 edition of the contest, three finalist scripts are then chosen, and the student filmmakers receive $22,000 to produce their films along with behind-the-scenes footage. A panel of industry professionals known as the "Red Ribbon Panel" judge the films on the categories of creativity, entertainment value, and creative fit to theme and tone. The highest scoring film is declared the winner of the contest and is shown in select theater locations nationwide (specifically AMC, B&B and Cinemark locations as of the 2026 contest).

== Coca-Cola Refreshing Filmmaker's Award Winners ==
Since its inception in 1998, twenty-two student filmmakers or pairs of student filmmakers have won the Coca-Cola Refreshing Filmmaker's Award (the number of winners is lower than the number of years since the beginning of the contest due to the absence of the contest in 2015 and 2021). Notable finalists include bestselling author and director of Fanboys and Barely Lethal Kyle Newman and Emmy Award-winning director Josh Greenbaum, and award-winning writer and director Hikari Miyazaki. Many winners have gone on to write, direct and produce feature films or series for major brands or platforms.

Year	Student Filmmaker(s)	University	Film Title
1998	Kyle Newman	New York University	"Bitten by Love"
1999	Fredrick Johnson	University of Southern California	"Through Thick and Thin"
2000	Jason Doty	Florida State University	"Escape Back to the Movies"
2001	Peter Hunziker	University of California, Los Angeles	"You Too Could Be a Winner!"
2002	David Pastor-Vallejo	Columbia University	"Movie (Theater) Hero"
2003	Jordan Ross	New York University	"Mafia Movie Madness"
2004	Brett Levner & Steve Sole	Columbia University	"Being Reel"
2005	Matthew Pope	Florida State University	"The Line Starts Here"
2006	Rosemary Lambert	Chapman University	"The Reel Monkey"
2007	Josh Greenbaum & Raul Fernandez	University of Southern California	"The Morning Routine"
2008	Austin Formato	University of California, Los Angeles	"The Museum"
2009	Jerome Sable & Michael Montgomery	University of Southern California	"Meanwhile..."
2010	Alice Mathias & Andy Landen	University of Southern California	"Message in a Bottle"
2011	Philip Kimbrough	Elon University	"Cease and Deceased"
2012	Simon Savelyev & Steven Huffaker	University of California, Los Angeles	"Prom Night"
2013	Dean Coots	Elon University	"Break the Night"
2014	Merlin Camozzi	University of California, Los Angeles	"What we Need"
2016	Ameer Kazmi	School of Visual Arts	"Blindfold"
2017	Julian Conner & Tom Teller	Chapman University	"Crunch Time"
2018	Clara Montague & Eva Kirie	Ithaca College	"The Library"
2019	Devon Solwold & Shayain Lakhani	Savannah College of Art and Design	"Choose Happy"
2020	Elina Itugot & Henry Zhinin	Savannah College of Art and Design	"Let Loose"
2022	Anna McClanahan & Gabriel Ponte-Fleary	Rochester Institute of Technology	"Say Cheese"
2023	Gracie Hall & Bella Hall	Boise State University	"Expand"
2024	Adam Sheets & Destinee Neville	Brigham Young University	"Signs of Friendship"
2025	Aiko Lozar & Lexi Berganio	Chapman University	"Ticket to Everywhere"
2026	Angel Quinapallo & Kylie Shouse	Full Sail University	"Behind The Screens"

== Coca-Cola Refreshing Filmmaker's Award Winning Schools ==
Students from ten different schools have won the Coca-Cola Refreshing Filmmaker's Award out of the twenty-two contests that have been held. The schools that have produced the highest number of winning films are the University of California, Los Angeles and the University of Southern California. University of California, Los Angeles won in 2001 and 2008 in the Coca-Cola Refreshing Films competition and in 2012 and 2014 in the rebranded Sprite Films competition. University of Southern California won in 1999, 2007, 2009 and 2010. Two schools have managed to win the contest in two consecutive years: the University of Southern California in 2009 and 2010, and the Savannah College of Art and Design in 2019 and 2020. While Elon University won twice during the four-year period in which the program was renamed Sprite Films, it has not won during one of the contests labelled Coca-Cola Refreshing Films. The first ever winning school was the University of Southern California and the most recent winning school was Brigham Young University.

Wins	University	Location	Winning Year(s)
Four	University of California, Los Angeles	Los Angeles, California	2001, 2008, 2012, 2014
Four	University of Southern California	Los Angeles, California	1999, 2007, 2009, 2010
Three	Chapman University	Orange, California	2006, 2017, 2025
Two	Columbia University	New York City, New York	2002, 2004
Two	Elon University	Elon, North Carolina	2011, 2013
Two	Florida State University	Tallahassee, Florida	2000, 2005
Two	New York University	New York City, New York	1998, 2003
Two	Savannah College of Art and Design	Savannah, Georgia	2019, 2020
One	Boise State University	Boise, Idaho	2023
One	Brigham Young University	Provo, Utah	2024
One	Ithaca College	Ithaca, New York	2018
One	Rochester Institute of Technology	Rochester, New York	2022
One	School of Visual Arts	New York City, New York	2016
One	Full Sail University	Winter Park, Florida	2026

The years in italics indicate a win during the period in which the program was renamed "Sprite Films."

== Coca-Cola Refreshing Films Participating Schools ==
The 2022 edition of the contest features 40 total participating schools, including two schools (the New York Film Academy and Savannah College of Art and Design) which are participating with multiple different campuses. The initial application, including the first draft of the film's script and budget, was due on Friday, October 22, 2021, and participants were required to apply as a team of two students who were currently enrolled at one of the competing universities at the time of application or who graduated in December 2019 or later.

American Schools
University	Location
American Film Institute	Los Angeles, California
Arizona State University	Tempe, Arizona
Biola University	Mirada, California
Boise State University	Boise, Idaho
Bowie State University	Bowie, Maryland
California State University, Los Angeles	Los Angeles, California
Chapman University	Orange, California
Columbia College Chicago	Chicago, Illinois
Elon University	Elon, North Carolina
Florida State University	Tallahassee, Florida
Full Sail University	Winter Park, Florida
Georgia State University	Atlanta, Georgia
Hussian College Los Angeles	Los Angeles, California
Indiana University	Bloomington, Indiana
Iona College	New Rochelle, New York
Ithaca College	Ithaca, New York
Los Angeles Film School	Los Angeles, California
Loyola Marymount University	Los Angeles, California
Morehouse College	Atlanta, Georgia
New York Film Academy	Los Angeles, California
New York Film Academy	New York City, New York
New York Film Academy	South Beach, Florida
New York University	New York City, New York
Northwestern University	Evanston, Illinois
Pace University	New York City, New York
Ringling College of Art and Design	Sarasota, Florida
Rochester Institute of Technology	Rochester, New York
Savannah College of Art and Design	Atlanta, Georgia
Savannah College of Art and Design	Savannah, Georgia
School of Visual Arts	New York City, New York
Spelman College	Atlanta, Georgia
Temple University	Philadelphia, Pennsylvania
The New School	New York City, New York
The University of Texas at Austin	Austin, Texas
University of California, Los Angeles	Los Angeles, California
University of Central Florida	Orlando, Florida
University of Georgia	Athens, Georgia
University of Miami	Coral Gables, Florida
University of Nevada, Las Vegas	Las Vegas, Nevada
University of New Orleans	New Orleans, Louisiana
University of North Carolina School of the Arts	Winston-Salem, North Carolina
University of Notre Dame	Notre Dame, Indiana
University of West Georgia	Carrollton, Georgia
Western Kentucky University	Bowling Green, Kentucky
Woodbury University	Burbank, California

Canadian Schools
University	Location
Algonquin College	Ottawa, Ontario
British Columbia Institute of Technology	Burnaby, British Columbia
Capilano University	North Vancouver, British Columbia
Centennial College	Toronto, Ontario
George Brown College	Toronto, Ontario
Humber College	Toronto, Ontario
Mohawk College	Hamilton, Ontario
Mount Royal University	Calgary, Alberta
Toronto Metropolitan University	Toronto, Ontario
Seneca College	Toronto, Ontario

== Previously Participating Schools ==
These are the schools that have previously participated in the contest but are not participating in the current edition.

University	Location	Last Participation
American University	Washington D.C.	2022
Hofstra University	Nassau County, New York	2022
Santa Fe College	Gainesville, Florida	2022

== Coca-Cola Regal Films 2016 Contest ==
For the first time since 2010, when it was rebranded as Sprite Films, the Coca-Cola Refreshing Films contest took place in 2016, now marketed as Coca-Cola Regal Films due to its new collaboration with Regal Cinemas. The winner of the first contest after its relaunch was writer and director Ameer Kazmi from the School of Visual Arts in New York City, New York, giving the school its first-ever win in the competition. Three finalists were chosen from over one hundred submitted scripts. The finalists each received $15,000 to produce their 30-second films celebrating the movie-going experience. The deadline for the final film submission was September 12, 2016, and the completed films were then judged by the Red Ribbon Panel of industry experts. Kazmi's winning film, "Blindfold," tells the story of an overwhelmed woman who is led to a movie theater by her two roommates while wearing a blindfold, and then relaxing while enjoying Coca-Cola. After being declared the contest winner, the film began screening on October 28, 2016, in 567 Regal locations nationwide.

Student Filmmaker	University	Film Title
Noah Sterling	Savannah College of Art and Design	"24 Frames"
Eric Hernandez	Elon University	"A Life's Inspiration"
Ameer Kazmi	School of Visual Arts	"Blindfold"

== Coca-Cola Regal Films 2017 Contest ==
In the 2017 edition of the contest, students from 25 film schools across the country were eligible to submit their scripts focusing on the movie-going experience and Coca-Cola's role in it. Unlike the 2016 contest, students were required to submit their applications in teams of two. Additionally, five finalists were chosen in this edition, instead of three like in the previous year. Each of the finalist teams received $15,000 to produce their films, which ran for 30 seconds along for an additional 5-second bumper. The Red Ribbon Panel, consisting of industry professionals such as actor Clark Gregg, actor Giovanni Ribisi and director Richie Keen, selected the winning film, which was announced during CinemaCon in Las Vegas, Nevada on March 27, 2017. The grand prize winners were Julian Conner and Tom Teller from Chapman University, whose film was shown in Regal locations nationwide beginning in May 2017. This was Chapman University's first win in the contest since Rosemary Lambert's "The Reel Monkey" in 2006, and its second win overall. The winning film, "Crunch Time," is about a robot who comes to life in a theater lobby and joins the human movie-goers to watch a film. RED Digital Cinema, the provider of professional technology for the contest, also awarded Conner and Teller with a SCARLET-W 5K camera package and Chapman University with a RED EPIC-X 6K camera package. In addition to "Crunch Time," Coca-Cola Regal Films also chose to air the finalist films "Coca-Cola Gaze" and "Just in Time" in theaters beginning in September 2017 due to the quality of the work put in by the student filmmakers.

Student Filmmakers	University	Film Title
Jane Hollon & Mia Niebruegge	American Film Institute	"Coca-Cola Gaze"
Julian Conner & Tom Teller	Chapman University	"Crunch Time"
Stephen Heleker & Xinzhong "Golden" Zhao	University of California, Los Angeles	"Just in Time"
Brian Blum & Justin Scholar	New York University	"Regal Lights"
Azzurra Catucci & Lillian Engel	Elon University	"Wanderfull"

== Coca-Cola Regal Films 2018 Contest ==
In the 2018 edition of the contest, the number of participating schools was expanded from 25 to 29. Five finalist scripts that highlighted the movie-going experience and the significance of Coca-Cola Regal Cinemas popcorn in it were selected from the submitted applications. Each of the five finalists were given $15,000 to produce their 35-second films. Clara Montague and Eva Kirie from Ithaca College were announced as the winners of the contest at CinemaCon in Las Vegas, Nevada on April 25, 2018, marking Ithaca College's first ever win in the competition. First-year students Montague and Kirie, majoring in television and radio, originally entered the contest for a class assignment that required them to submit a script, budget and crew list. The duo ultimately worked with a crew from Park Productions and Park Media Lab director Carol Jennings to produce their film, which was filmed at Ithaca College and Regal Cinemas. The winning film, "The Library," showcases a group of students studying in a library who decide to take a trip to the movie theater together, and was screened in Regal Cinemas locations nationwide beginning in May 2018. Like in the previous contest, RED also awarded the winning filmmakers with a RED RAVEN camera kit worth a retail value $14,999.95 and Ithaca College with a RED EPIC-W 8K S35 worth $35,895.

Along with the main competition, this year the program partnered with Universal Pictures' film Blockers to introduce a brand new "Fan Favorite Award." Between March 9 and April 20, 2018, movie fans were able to vote for their favorite film out of the five finalists by sharing the film's personal hashtag on Twitter. Voters were also entered to win a year of free movies and concessions at Regal Cinemas in the Fan Favorite Sweepstakes. A controversy emerged during the voting period when professor Kathleen Stansberry from one of the finalist schools, Elon University, discovered an irregularity in the frequency of votes cast for the University of California, Los Angeles. Stansberry argued that bots were used to manipulate the voting in favor of Jessie Lee and Xinzhong "Golden" Zhao's film "Frozen in Time," which would be a violation of the contest's rules. The contest organizers were informed of the alleged vote manipulation and investigated the matter. Ultimately, the films of Elon University and University of California, Los Angeles were both shown in theaters nationwide. This marked Zhao's second contest in a row being a finalist, and also his second contest in a row having his film shown in theaters, despite not winning either contest.

Student Filmmakers	University	Film Title
Jessie Lee & Xinzhong "Golden" Zhao	University of California, Los Angeles	"Frozen in Time"
Amanda Alvich & Mika Orr	School of Visual Arts	"Just One Bite"
Hunter Strauch & Patrick Wei	Elon University	"Movie Life"
Clara Montague & Eva Kirie	Ithaca College	"The Library"
Max McGillivray & Ronald Brown	Columbia University	"The Premiere"

== Coca-Cola Regal Films 2019 Contest ==
In the 2019 contest, teams of student filmmakers from 30 different schools were required to submit scripts highlighting the entertaining and relaxing aspects of the movie-going experience, and the significance of Coca-Cola and popcorn in it, by October 5, 2018. The five selected finalist teams out of roughly 500 submissions were given $15,000 to produce their 35-second films (including the 5-second bumper). The finalists were given access to RED camera equipment and Zeiss lenses during the production process, and also worked with professional colorists at Deluxe's EFILM during the post-production process. This year, director and actress Olivia Wilde collaborated with Coca-Cola Regal Films to mentor the student filmmaker finalists, serve on the Red Ribbon Panel, and ultimately announce the winning film. Second-year director Devon Solwold and fourth-year producer Shayain Lakhani from the Savannah College of Art and Design were announced as the grand prize winners by Wilde on social media on April 4, 2019, and their film "Choose Happy" debuted at CinemaCon in Las Vegas, Nevada on the same day. Solwold and Lakhani were awarded a RED DSMC2 DRAGON-X camera kit and ZEISS cinema lenses, and their film began screening in Regal Cinemas locations nationwide in summer 2019, including during the opening weekend of Avengers: Endgame. This was the first win in the contest for Savannah College of Art and Design. "Choose Happy" was the only film of the five finalists to be led solely by students in each department during the production process. The winning film tells the story of a sad man with a rain cloud over his head who takes a trip to the movie theater. The rain cloud transforms into a miniature Sun and his spirits are lifted as he takes a sip of Coca-Cola before watching the movie.

This year also featured a new version of the Fan Favorite Award, now called the "Social Media Campaign Award." Finalist schools were required to submit a case study showcasing how they utilized social media to promote their film throughout the contest period. The winners of the award were Lily Campisi and Nicholle Peterson from the University of Nevada, Las Vegas. This was the school's first time being selected as a finalist in the competition. Campisi and Peterson's film, "The Big Wish," follows a girl who discovers a genie in a thrift shop and wishes to go to her happy place, which is Regal Cinemas. Campisi and Peterson used official accounts from departments at University of Nevada, Las Vegas and the hashtag #RebelsBigWish in order to spread their film across social media. The actor for the genie in the film, Danny Shepherd, also had a large following on social media. A local NBC affiliate filmed a live broadcast during the filming of "The Big Wish" at Regal Cinemas. Additionally, the Nevada Film Office, Fox 5 Morning Show, American Marketing Association's podcast, and the Review-Journal local newspaper showcased the film. "The Big Wish" was shown in Regal Cinemas locations nationwide from December 13, 2019, until February 1, 2020.

Student Filmmakers	University	Film Title
Devon Solwold & Shayain Lakhani	Savannah College of Art and Design	"Choose Happy"
Elon Zlotnik & Nathan Nguyen-Le	University of California, Los Angeles	"It Happened Like This"
Lily Campisi & Nicholle Peterson	University of Nevada, Las Vegas	"The Big Wish"
Jamie Rabinovitch & Thais Vitorelli	The New School	"The Exchange"
Cooper Peery & Tyler Sanchez	New York University	"You Didn't Know That"

== Coca-Cola Refreshing Films 2020 Contest ==
The 2020 edition of the contest marked the return of the title Coca-Cola Refreshing Films, after Coca-Cola's collaboration with Regal Cinemas ended after the theater chain created a new collaboration with PepsiCo, who became its sole non-alcoholic beverage provider. The number of participating schools in the contest was once again expanded, and students from 38 schools nationwide, including two different locations for the Savannah College of Art and Design, were eligible to enter in teams of two members. In this year's contest, at least one member of each team was required to be a student who identifies as female. Initial script applications were due October 10, 2019, and the assigned target audience was 18 to 19 year old movie-goers. From over 900 scripts, five finalists were chosen to produce their 35-second film (including the 5-second bumper) from January to April 2020 with $15,000 and additional resources from the program's partners RED Digital Cinema, ZEISS and Deluxe's EFILM. The winning filmmakers were Elina Itugot and Henry Zhinin from the Savannah College of Art and Design. This was the school's second consecutive win, making them the second school ever to do so after the University of Southern California's winning films in 2009 and 2010. Itugot and Zhinin received a RED DRAGON-X camera package, a ZEISS Milvus Superspeed lens kit and an additional $15,000 in prize money. Their film, "Let Loose," is about two college roommates who are looking for a break from their stress and boredom. The idea for the film came from Itugot's personal struggles with letting herself relax and let loose, and was written by her. Savannah College of Art and Design's entry was once again the only one to be produced with every department led only by students, and it was also the only entry this year to utilize both live-action and animation aspects.

Student Filmmakers	University	Film Title
Katy-May Hudson & Sakshi Gurnani	School of Visual Arts	"Just a Step Away"
Elina Itugot & Henry Zhinin	Savannah College of Art and Design	"Let Loose"
Mia Elliott & Miguel Garcia	Columbia College Chicago	"Magic"
Grace Lindblad & Forrest Clark	Biola University	"Neon Jungle"
Abby Hauptman & Desiree Tolchin	Ithaca College	"The Friday Film Five"

== Coca-Cola Refreshing Films 2022 Contest ==
The 2022 contest featured four finalist schools selected out of over 500 script submissions and 15 semifinalists.

The team for the Rochester Institute of Technology included the first deaf producer in the contest's history, Gabriel Ponte-Fleary. Rochester Institute of Technology got their first ever win in the contest on their debut with the film "Say Cheese" made by first-year grad student and producer Ponte-Fleary and second-year film production student and director Anna McClanahan. The pair wanted to create "something wholesome, nostalgic, and magical" for their film. The president of the National Technical Institute for the Deaf, Dr. Gerard Buckley, covered all interpreting costs for the film's production. The crew for "Say Cheese" consisted of both hearing and deaf members. It was filmed in February 2022 during two overnight shoots at the Pittsford Community Library and Cinemark Tinseltown theater.

"Say Cheese" was announced as the grand prize winner at CinemaCon in Las Vegas in April 2022. The judging panel included industry experts from Coca-Cola, AMC Theatres, and Cinemark Theatres. The film screened at AMC and Cinemark locations from July to September 2022. The prize for Ponte-Fleary and McClanahan also included ED KOMODO camera package and a ZEISS lens kit. The winning film tells a love story of cross-cultural communication, and Ponte-Fleary hopes that as a result viewers will "be inspired to learn American Sign Language and see Deaf people as equals."

Student Filmmakers	University	Film Title
Kaylen Ng & May-Lynn Le	Chapman University	"Movie Hopping"
Bryan Harris & Lynn Nguyen	California State University, Los Angeles	"Peace of Mind"
Anna McClanahan & Gabriel Ponte-Fleary	Rochester Institute of Technology	"Say Cheese"
Jenny Leigh Reed & Savana Vagueiro Da Fonseca	University of California, Los Angeles	"Synergy"

== Coca-Cola Refreshing Films 2023 Contest ==
The 2023 contest once again featured five finalist schools, including the first-ever Canadian finalist school in Capilano University.

Student Filmmakers	University	Film Title
Gracie Hall & Bella Hall	Boise State University	"Expand"
Mika Heiskanen & Matthew Carew	Capilano University	"The Cinematic Touch"
Sam Smith & Malaika Menezes	Ithaca College	"Phone Date"
Negan Fu & Will Fritz	Savannah College of Art and Design	"A Leg Up"
Christine Zivic & Gaby Spampinato	University of California, Los Angeles	"Airplane Mode"

== Coca-Cola Refreshing Films 2024 Contest ==
The 2024 contest was narrowed down to four finalist schools.

Student Filmmakers	University	Film Title
Adam Sheets & Destinee Neville	Brigham Young University	"Signs of Friendship"
Denzel Noylander & Naomi Baker	Humber College	"Auditorium 4"
Charlotte Bigotto & John Schell	Montclair State University	"Super Connections"
Lou Duchin & Maria Palmeri	Rochester Institute of Technology	"How's The View?"

== Coca-Cola Refreshing Films 2025 Contest ==
The 2025 contest was narrowed down to four finalist schools. "Ticket to Everywhere" won the Red Ribbon Award. The 2025 contest introduced a Best Music Composition Winner, which was won by composer Shao Jean for "A Cinema's Groove", which also received the Cinemark Fan Favorite

Student Filmmakers	University	Film Title
Aiko Lozar & Lexi Berganio	Chapman University	"Ticket to Everywhere"
Amirah Adem & Biola Olateru-Olagbegi	University of Southern California	"A Cinema's Groove"*
Madelyn Domnick & Jeminta Wangkietkajon	Savannah College of Art and Design	"JUMP!"
Grace Tompkins & K.L. Sanon	University of Central Florida	"Screening Love"

== Coca-Cola Refreshing Films 2026 Contest ==
The 2026 contest was narrowed down to three finalist schools and was selected from over 1,000 submissions. Filmmakers were encouraged to incorporate elements of Americana in celebration of the United States' 250th anniversary. Each team was provided in-kind access to a theater sponsor location for an overnight shoot, a RED production camera (RED DIGITAL CINEMA V-RAPTOR 8K VV), a Nikon camera for behind-the-scenes content (Nikon ZR), and a $22,000 production budget allocated directly to the team.

Behind The Screens aimed to celebrate the shared experience of moviegoing by blending multiple eras of cinema into a single, interconnected movie world. The production brought together a large student crew across multiple disciplines, including art direction, creature effects, and virtual production. Filming took place in February 2026 over two primary production days, including a shoot at Cinemark Orlando and the V1 Studio at Full Sail University. The project utilized a volumetric LED stage environment and practical effects, including a large-scale creature element operated by the effects team.

For the first time, two of the finalist teams were from Full Sail University. This year's program sponsors are AMC Theatres, B&B Theaters, Cinemark, Company 3 and RED\Nikon. Technical sponsors include Atlas Lens Co, Leitz Cine and CineVantage. The Red Ribbon Winner was announced at the 2026 CinemaCon in Las Vegas on April 16, 2026. The Director of Photography, Erik VanLenten, was provided with a RED KOMODO X camera as a prize. All six finalists attended CinemaCon 2026. "Behind the Screens" written and directed by Angel Quinapallo, won Best Music Composition, with Composer Kevin Kraus, as well as the grand prize Red Ribbon Award.

Student Filmmakers	University	Film Title
Angel Quinapallo & Kylie Shouse	Full Sail University	"Behind The Screens"*
Avery Harrell & Aditya Gupta	Howard University	"The Usual"
Brandon Bishop & Christina Almuina	Full Sail University	"What Makes Them Magic"
