= Puppy Love (2023 film) =

Film by Richard Alan Reid and Nick Fabiano

- Release poster
- Directed by: Richard Alan Reid; Nick Fabiano
- Written by: Greg Glienna; Peter Stass; Kirsten Guenther; Dan Scheinkman; Richard Alan Reid
- Produced by: Michael Philip; Jason Moring
- Starring: Lucy Hale; Grant Gustin; Nore Davis; Michael Hitchcock; Jane Seymour
- Cinematography: Stephen Chandler Whitehead
- Edited by: Suzanne Spangler; Lauren Stewart
- Music by: Ian Livingstone
- Production companies: Amazon Studios; Lionsgate; BuzzFeed Studios; CR8IV DNA; Garlin Pictures
- Distributed by: Amazon Freevee
- Release date: August 18, 2023
- Running time: 106 minutes
- Country: United States
- Language: English
- Box office: $66,178

Puppy Love is a 2023 American romantic comedy film directed by Nick Fabiano and Richard Alan Reid. The film stars Lucy Hale, Grant Gustin, Nore Davis, Michael Hitchcock, and Jane Seymour.

After a disastrous first date, polar opposites Nicole (Lucy Hale) and Max (Grant Gustin) vow to never speak again, until they learn that Nicole's dog has gotten Max's dog pregnant, and they are forced to co-parent the animals.

Puppy Love was released by Amazon Freevee on August 18, 2023.

== Plot ==
Max Stevenson is an introvert who suffers from social anxiety. Under threat of possibly losing his IT job for always working from home, his therapist suggests he get a dog as a way to interact with people. He adopts a quiet Cavalier King Charles Spaniel, naming her Chloe.

Nicole Matthews, a messy commitment-phobe, goes to her mom's and meets her sister's new fiancé Alistair. Her mother has given her younger daughter her engagement ring, having given up on Nicole settling down. Over dinner, when Nicole proudly announces she's been promoted to head stager for her real estate company, her mother belittles her job. Talking to Alistair like she's not there, she's openly critical about Nicole's life choices.

While Max goes to bed early, as he dislikes typical weekend nightlife, Nicole is out doing shots and clubbing. Arriving home late, she inadvertently adopts a homeless dog hanging around her building's dumpster after showing him kindness. After cleaning him, she names him Channing Tatum.

Both Nicole and Max go on Bumble, choosing each other because of their dog pics. Meeting up in the park, he tries a couple of lines that his friend suggested, badly. Max's OCD and Nicole's extroverted behavior result in a disastrous first date. She gives him ghost-pepper hot spicy chicken, meant to be a type of truth serum, which he hates. Then, when Max asks Nicole a question she deflects. Meanwhile, the dogs disappear and they find them fornicating. He is disgusted, telling her off, and the polar opposites vow to never speak again.

However, when Max and Nicole learn that Channing has gotten Chloe pregnant, they are forced to co-parent the animals. Meeting up in the park, they clearly see their dogs are fond of each other, so they agree to set up dog play dates in neither of their homes. Shortly after, Nicole's landlord threatens to evict her because of Channing, so Max agrees to let him stay. However, Nicole then has to stay as he's lonely. She temporarily brings in second-hand items for a house she's staging, which triggers Max's OCD.

Taking a walk calms Max's nerves, so when he returns he explains to Nicole that his COVID quarantine, caused by his fiancée's cheating, worsened his OCD. She shows empathy, prompting his spontaneous kiss. Nicole didn't reciprocate, so they agreed to stay neutral. As they spend more time together, Max is able to return to work. They do doggie Lamaze classes and bond more.

Nicole invites Max to go out for drinks, but he refuses, so she meets her girlfriend alone. One of her clients Hunter, whose house she successfully staged, shows up and they party.

Returning to Max's to walk the dogs, Hunter is with Nicole. They wake Max, who ends up punching Hunter as he keeps touching his things. He leaves, the dog owners fight and a frightened Chloe leaves through the door Hunter hadn't closed upon leaving. Max kicks them both out upon his return with Chloe.

A few days later Nicole returns with an apology. Together again, the humans and dogs do a road trip for her art school interview at University of Washington, but get waylaid due to Chloe going into labor. Unbeknownst to Nicole, Max submitted her portfolio virtually, so right after they spent the night together for the first time, she was surprised to be accepted into their art program.

Max invites Nicole and Channing to officially stay. Once the puppies are big enough, he suggests they have a party to introduce them. Now it can be seen Max is out of his shell, with no sign of his OCD or introversion although the apartment is crowded, thanks to their pack.

== Cast ==
- Lucy Hale as Nicole Matthews
- Grant Gustin as Max Stevenson
- Nore Davis as Sid
- Jenna Goulding as Layney Matthews
- Christine Lee as Shay
- Al Miro as Hunter Fosterini
- Rachel Risen as Lorraine
- Jane Seymour as Diane Matthews
- Corey Woods as Harper
- Michael Hitchcock as Dr. Hert

== Production ==
Puppy Love was inspired by BuzzFeed's 2015 series of short films for Purina Puppy Chow called Puppyhood, and produced by BuzzFeed Studios through Lionsgate. It was produced by Michael Philip and Jason Moring, and executive produced by Richard Alan Reid, Jonah Peretti, Brian Etting, and Josh Etting. It was directed by Reid and Nick Fabiano, and written by Greg Glienna, Peter Stass, Kirsten Guenther, Dan Scheinkman, and Reid. Lucy Hale, Grant Gustin, Jane Seymour, Michael Hitchcock and Nore Davis were cast in lead roles. Principal photography took place in the Canadian cities of Vancouver and Kelowna in mid-2022.

== Release ==
In June 2023, it was reported that Amazon Freevee had acquired the rights to the Lionsgate film. Puppy Love was released on August 18, 2023.

== Reception ==
On the review aggregator website Rotten Tomatoes, 46% of 13 critics' reviews are positive, with an average rating of 4.9/10.
