= Adam Ellis =

Adam Ellis may refer to:

- Adam Ellis (artist) (born 1986), American webcomic artist
- Adam Ellis (speedway rider) (born 1996), British grasstrack and motorcycle speedway rider
- Adam Gibb Ellis (died 1894), chief justice of Jamaica
