= Mika Orr =

American filmmaker

Mika Orr is a Brooklyn-based American filmmaker best known for the short films Professional Cuddler (2017), Duet (2020), and the documentary miniseries #AMiNORMAL in 2022.

== Biography ==
Orr earned a master's degree from the School of Visual Arts in New York City in May 2017. Her thesis project was the short film Professional Cuddler, starring Dana Ivey. She and fellow School of Visual Arts alumnus Amanda Alvich were finalists for the Coca-Cola Refreshing Filmmaker's Award in 2018 for their entry "Just One Bite."

In 2021, Orr announced work a feature-length documentary film, which is being shot concurrently in Germany, Uganda, and Colombia.

== Filmography ==
Year	Film	Credited Director	Credited Producer	Credited Writer	Credited Cinematographer	Notes
2007	Stray Soul	Yes				Short film
2008	The Player	Yes		Yes	Yes	Short film
2008	Chronicle of a Kidnap				Yes	Documentary
2017	Professional Cuddler	Yes	Yes	Yes		Short film
2020	Duet	Yes	Yes	Yes		Short film
2022	#AMiNORMAL	Yes	Yes	Yes	Yes	Documentary miniseries
