= 1Up (film) =

2022 comedy film

1UP
- Official release poster
- Directed by: Kyle Newman
- Written by: Julia Yorks
- Produced by: Jason Moring; Michael Philip; Richard Alan Reid
- Starring: Paris Berelc; Taylor Zakhar Perez; Hari Nef; Ruby Rose
- Cinematography: Kristofer Bonnell
- Edited by: Christine Kim; Mitch Martin
- Music by: Jessica Rose Weiss
- Production companies: Lionsgate; BuzzFeed Studios
- Distributed by: Amazon Studios
- Release date: July 15, 2022
- Running time: 100 minutes
- Country: United States
- Language: English

1Up is a 2022 American comedy film directed by Kyle Newman and written by Julia Yorks. It stars Paris Berelc, Taylor Zakhar Perez, Hari Nef, and Ruby Rose. It was released on July 15, 2022, by Amazon Studios. The film depicts an all-girls team competing in a gaming competition to earn prizes.

== Cast ==
- Paris Berelc as Vivian
- Taylor Zakhar Perez as Dustin
- Hari Nef as Sloane
- Ruby Rose as Parker
- Nicholas Coombe as Owen
- D.J. Mausner as Diane
- Madison Baines as Lilly
- Lolita Milena as Jenna
- Kevin Farley as Dean Davis
- Robert Levey II as Ace
- Rami Khan as Adi
- Stephen Joffe as Riccardo
- Aviva Mongillo as Indigo
- Kataem O'Connor as Lance
- Daniel Williston as Lewis
- Jean-Michel Le Gal as Announcer

== Production ==
In October 2020, it was announced Ellen Page and Paris Berelc had joined the cast of the film, with Kyle Newman set to direct from a screenplay by Julia Yorks, with BuzzFeed Studios set to produce the film. In January 2021, Ruby Rose, Taylor Zakhar Perez, Hari Nef and Nicholas Coombe joined the cast of the film, with Rose replacing Page, with Lionsgate set to distribute.

Principal photography took place from November 27, 2020 to February 21, 2021, in Toronto.

== Release ==
In May 2022, Amazon Studios acquired the distribution rights to the film. It was released on July 15, 2022, on Amazon Prime Video.
