= Ash Perez =

American comedian, writer, and actor

- Perez in 2026
- Born: Ashly Perez; 1989 or 1990 (age 35–36)
- Education: Pepperdine University
- Occupations: Comedian, actor, writer
- Organization: Buzzfeed
- Website: ashperez.com

Ash Perez, born Ashly Perez (born 1989 or 1990), is an American comedian, actor, and writer. He (Note: Perez uses he/him and they/them pronouns. For readability, this article will use he/him pronouns to discuss him.) first gained attention for his work on BuzzFeed as a comedian, writer, and actor. He is currently a member of The Try Guys, and has written two books, Read This for Inspiration and Speak Now.

== Biography ==
Perez has stated that he attended Pepperdine University and first intended to become a diplomat before working as a teacher in Daegu in 2012. He has also stated he has ADHD.

Perez began working at Buzzfeed in the 2010s, and came out as bisexual in 2015, while beginning work on the BuzzFeed web series You Do You, where he played himself. In 2016, he created his own series, Unfortunately Ashly, starring himself on BuzzFeed. It received a second season. He subsequently went on to become a writer on Good Trouble.

Perez's first book, Read This for Inspiration came out in 2020. It includes what PrideSource described as "sparks to ignite one's imagination" and tips for creativity. He stated that part of his goal was to make every chapter a quick read in the morning.

In 2022, he revealed that he had married his former Buzzfeed colleague Chantel Houston. They divorced in 2026.

Perez came out as transgender in October 2023, and stated that he uses use both he/him and they/them pronouns. He has since discussed the financial effects and the social changes that came with his transition.

In 2024, he became a member of The Try Guys, where he has headlined a series called New Guy Tries. The series is about him doing stereotypically masculine things he hadn't previously done and figuring out how to "figure out what manhood means". He has emphasized positive masculinity. The series was renewed for a second season: he stated that the first season was about manhood, but the second was about boyhood that he didn't get to experience.

His second book, Speak Now, described as a "queer My Best Friend's Wedding", was released as an audiobook on the International Transgender Day of Visibility 2026, with voice actors including Jena Malone and Arienne Mandi. He has stated that he is working on a screen adaptation of the work.
