= Art & Arcana: A Visual History =

2018 book

- Author: Michael Witwer, Sam Witwer, Kyle Newman, Jon Peterson
- Publication date: 2018
- ISBN: 978-0399580949

Art & Arcana: A Visual History is a book by Michael and Sam Witwer, Kyle Newman, and Jon Peterson published in 2018.

== Contents ==
Art & Arcana is a book focused on the artwork of Dungeons & Dragons throughout its history.

== Reception ==
Steven H Silver reviewed Art & Arcana for Black Gate, and stated that "Art and Arcana is not only a beautiful book looking at more than 50 years of gaming art, but it also provides the most complete public history of Dungeons and Dragons, its founders, and the culture which has grown up around it. Interspersed with the familiar iconography of the game are pictures of its founders, internal corporate memos, and rarely seen sketches that led to the more familiar final versions of the artwork. It is not only an essential work for current gamers, but also for those who have fond memories of playing AD&D when it caused one to be ostracized rather than celebrated."

Art & Arcana was a finalist for the 2019 Hugo Award for Best Art Book.

== Reviews ==
- Forbes
- The New York Times
