= The Try Guys =

American online comedy group

- Genre: Comedy
- Created by: Eugene Lee Yang; Keith Habersberger; Ned Fulmer; Zach Kornfeld
- Starring: Keith Habersberger; Zach Kornfeld; Ned Fulmer; Eugene Lee Yang; Miles Bonsignore; YB Chang Biste; Jared Popkin; Ryan Garcia; Kwesi James; Jonny Manganello; Marissa Rivera; Joyce Louis-Jean; Ash Perez
- Country of origin: United States
- Original language: English
- No. of seasons: 10
- No. of episodes: 956+ (list of episodes)

Production
- Executive producers: Keith Habersberger; Zach Kornfeld; Eugene Lee Yang; Rachel Ann Cole; Nick Rufca
- Producers: Erica Lynn Schmueck; Desiree Hurlbut; Emily Stikeman; Leslie Dueñas
- Editors: Devlin McCluskey; YB Chang; Will Witwer; Elliot Dickerhoof; Mishelle Martin; Skyler Klingenberg; Liam Sullivan; Moira Joy Smith; Chris Burke; Aiko Igasaki
- Camera setup: Multi-camera
- Production company: 2nd Try LLC

Original release
- Network: YouTube; 2nd Try (2024 – present)
- Release: September 12, 2014 – present

Related
- Squad Wars

The Try Guys is an American online entertainment group and media production company that produces content for their YouTube channel. The group was founded by Eugene Lee Yang, Keith Habersberger, Ned Fulmer, and Zach Kornfeld. The Try Guys are known for testing a wide range of activities, such as testing their sperm count, raising toddlers, shaving their legs, and wearing women's underwear. The four men created The Try Guys while working for BuzzFeed before forming their own company, 2nd Try LLC, in 2018.

They have since expanded their company to include more than twenty employees, starred in a Food Network show titled No Recipe Road Trip, and released a book titled The Hidden Power of F*cking Up. As of October 2022, the channel hosts eleven spinoff series starring employees of the company and other collaborators. Then in 2024, they launched a boutique subscription streaming service called 2ndTry TV.

Fulmer was removed from the company in September 2022 following an extramarital affair with an employee. In May 2024, Yang announced his departure from their flagship show; he will, however, retain co-ownership of the company. In the same month, the Try Guys announced 9 new cast members consisting of Jonny Manganello, Joyce Louis-Jean, Miles Bonsignore, Ryan Garcia, YB Chang Biste, Marissa Rivera, Jared Popkin, Ash Perez, and Kwesi James.

== History ==
=== BuzzFeed era (2014–2018) ===
The group was formed at the company BuzzFeed in 2014 by then-employees Eugene Lee Yang, Ned Fulmer, Keith Habersberger, and Zach Kornfeld with the creation of their first video "Guys Try Ladies' Underwear for the First Time". Elizabeth de Luna for MTV News emphasized the innovative character of the show:

"Back in 2014, BuzzFeed had not yet developed a show around a recurring cast. A series called “The Creepy Guy” starred a single producer and ran from 2013–2015, but The Try Guys was the first series to consistently feature the same group of talent. It was also the first to turn BuzzFeed producers into on-camera personalities, a motif that now anchors BuzzFeed’s original programming".

Their show Squad Wars premiered on YouTube Red in early 2017. Their most-watched video, "The Try Guys Try Labor Pain Simulation", has garnered over 35 million views as of March 2021. The group has accumulated over 100 million views among their videos on BuzzFeed's YouTube channel.

In 2017, the Try Guys were nominated for the Streamy Awards audience choice Show of the Year award. In 2018, the Try Guys hosted the 8th annual Streamy Awards and won the audience choice Show of the Year award, the same one for which they had been nominated in 2017.

=== Independent studio (2018–2023) ===
On June 16, 2018, The Try Guys announced that they had left BuzzFeed and started their own independent production company, 2nd Try LLC. 2nd Try LLC gained all rights to The Try Guys brand; BuzzFeed remained as the branded content and advertising sales representative for several months. On December 2, 2019, the Try Guys explained that they decided to leave Buzzfeed as their contracts were expiring, with Kornfeld and Fulmer contributing to the idea of developing their own independent production company.

On their own YouTube channel, the Try Guys have received over 2.5 billion views and over 8 million subscribers. Slate highlighted that nearly 80% of their subscribers are women and that their audience "skews young, particularly women in their late teens and early 20s".

On January 30, 2019, the Try Guys announced that they'd co-written a book, The Hidden Power of F*cking Up. It was released by HarperCollins on June 18, 2019. The book follows each of the four Try Guys as they challenge themselves to improve their lives, discussing how their failures have impacted them and helped them grow. The Hidden Power of F*cking Up reached the number one position on the New York Times Best Seller list in the self help, advice, and miscellaneous category soon after its release. One review described it as "completely approachable in the way it's written… an honest, open discussion about failure." The group also went on tour, titled "Legends of the Internet", and launched The TryPod podcast in 2019.

By 2021, the company had grown to almost 24 employees. In the same year, they produced an Olympic-themed original series, How To Olympics, an eight-episode series that gives viewers everything they need to know about select Olympic events. The series covers sport climbing, taekwondo, rhythmic gymnastics, hammer throw, artistic swimming, breaking, badminton, and fencing—telling viewers how each event is scored, how to win, and what it takes to master these athletic disciplines. The Try Guys host the Food Network show No Recipe Road Trip with the Try Guys, inspired by their YouTube series Without A Recipe. The show, initially a one-off special, was due to premiere on Discovery+ and Food Network in 2021, but was postponed when it was ordered for a six-episode season, which premiered on August 31, 2022.

==== Fulmer's removal (September 2022) ====
On September 27, 2022, the Try Guys announced that Fulmer would no longer be working with the group following an internal review regarding Fulmer having an extramarital affair with an employee. In their official statement on YouTube, the group stated they had been informed on Labor Day weekend of Fulmer having public displays of affection with someone who was not his wife. They stated they confronted Fulmer about the allegations, which he confirmed. After an HR investigation, Fulmer's removal was finalized.

On October 3, 2022, the Try Guys announced that Fulmer would be removed from upcoming videos except in several sponsored videos, "ostensibly due to contractual obligations". Zoë Aiko Sonnenberg, writing for Slate, analyzed that beyond the Try Guys' comedy "shtick", their brand promises the "performance of authenticity" with personas as "good guys". Sonnenberg wrote, "to this end, all four of the Try Guys are very publicly partnered, and those partners have become famous themselves. [...] The Try Guys had to act quickly when Ned's character as a devoted husband and father fell apart and breached an essential contract with the audience."

=== Streaming service (2024–present) ===
In May 2024, the Try Guys launched a boutique subscription streaming service called 2ndTry TV. The Hollywood Reporter commented that the group is not leaving "YouTube altogether" as they plan "to lean on it as a marketing tool for 2nd Try, to encourage viewers to give their own platform a chance" with hopes that their own platform will be more "sustainable". They also announced that it was Yang's final season on their flagship show as he was stepping away to focus on other creative endeavors. In September 2025, The Try Guys announced the creation of their new YouTube channel, Try Every Day, on which they would try something new every day Monday through Friday, inviting the viewers to try something new alongside them.

== Cast ==
The Try Guys
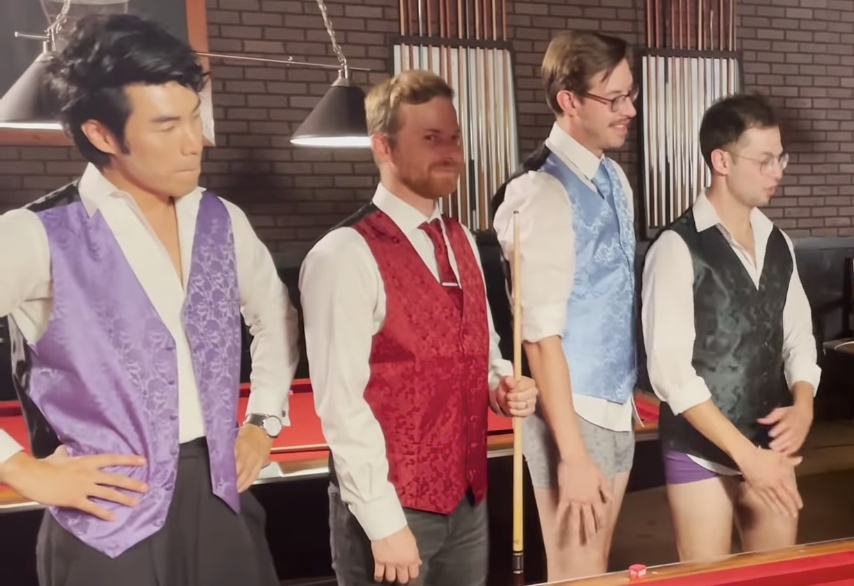
- (Left to right) Eugene Lee Yang, Ned Fulmer, Keith Habersberger, Zach Kornfeld

YouTube information
- Channel: The Try Guys
- Years active: 2014–present
- Genre: Comedy
- Subscribers: 7.91 million
- Views: 2.9 billion
- Last updated: September 28, 2025
- Website: tryguys.com

=== Current members ===
==== Original members ====
===== Keith =====
Keith Douglas Habersberger (born June 18, 1987; /ˈhæbərsbɜːrɡər/ HABB-ərz-bur-gər) was born to Donald and Patricia Habersberger in Carthage, Tennessee. He is the youngest of three brothers, including Brian Habersberger, the creator of Twitch channel Nothing, Forever. He is a graduate of Illinois State University with a Bachelor in Acting and French Horn. Habersberger is married to Rebecca "Becky" Habersberger (née Miller), with whom he has a son.

Habersberger is part of the comedy music group Lewberger with Hughie Stone Fish and Alex Lewis. The group has appeared on several television talent shows, including Bring the Funny in 2018 and America's Got Talent in 2021.

He is known for his love of fried chicken and has focused on food-related content over the years, the most prominent shows being Eat the Menu, Chicken Watch, and Gourmet Garbage. He is also one of the creators of the Try Guys' series Without A Recipe. On November 30, 2019, Habersberger announced the release of his signature hot sauce, Keith's Chicken Sauce, which sold out within two days and was well received by consumers. Habersberger now has a line of Burger and Taco sauces also available through Heatonist.

===== Zach =====
Zachary Andrew "Zach" Kornfeld (born July 26, 1990), was born to Jewish parents Adam and Margo Kornfeld in Scarsdale, New York. He became involved in filmmaking and editing after receiving a LEGO Steven Spielberg Movie Maker Kit as a child. He is Jewish but does not keep kosher and did not have a bar mitzvah, though he did choose the Hebrew name Rakedan (Hebrew: רַקְדָן), meaning dancer. As a child, he appeared on Saturday Night Live in an episode hosted by Elijah Wood that aired on December 13, 2003.Kornfeld attended Scarsdale High School before graduating from Emerson College with a Bachelor of Fine Arts. Kornfeld was diagnosed with ankylosing spondylitis in his late twenties. In 2019, he decided to undergo hair restoration, a combination of surgery and microblading, to combat pattern hair loss. On May 13, 2020, Kornfeld announced his intention to start a six-part series on the Try Guys YouTube Channel challenge of starting his own business, Zadiko Tea Co., for less than $500.

Kornfeld married his longtime partner, Margaret "Maggie" Bustamante, in February 2023. The two have a daughter, Lucia, born in 2025.

==== New members ====
===== Ash =====
Ash Perez is an American actor, writer, and producer. He rose to fame in the 2010s as a Buzzfeed Development Partner, starring in numerous videos, notably alongside fellow Buzzfeed stars Safiya Nygaard, Quinta Brunson, and The Try Guys. During his time there he co-created the channel Buzzfeed Violet.

In 2023, Ash announced he is transgender, and uses he/they pronouns. He has spoken more about being transgender on the 2nd Try show New Guy Tries.

===== Jared =====
Jared Popkin is an American actor, writer, and director. He is a founding member of an improv and sketch group and freelance actor, writer, and director for Buzzfeed. He had appeared in multiple Try Guys videos before becoming an official part of the cast in May 2024.

===== Jonny =====
Jonny Manganello, also known as JonnyCakes, is an American baker and influencer originally from Michigan. In 2022, he was a participant on the Netflix show Is It Cake?, after which he starred as a judge in multiple Without a Recipe episodes on the Try Guys YouTube channel. In May 2024, he was added to The Try Guys cast.

===== Joyce =====
Joyce Louis-Jean (born June 10, 1995) attended the Savannah College of Art and Design, where she earned a bachelor's degree in film, cinema, and video studies. Louis-Jean began her career at BuzzFeed as part of the company's Production Fellowship program. In May 2024, Louis-Jean became an official member of The Try Guys cast.

===== Kwesi =====
Kwesi James was raised in Brooklyn, New York, before moving with his family to Florida, where he attended high school. He was later expelled but still went on to pursue a career in film. James has dyslexia, which was not diagnosed until his college years.

In 2008, James relocated to Los Angeles, California, to pursue a career in film. He worked for DNA Media Group and then joined BuzzFeed. Following the founding of 2nd Try LLC, he began appearing as a guest star in several of their videos. He eventually became one of the nine new official members of The Try Guys in May 2024.

===== Marissa =====
Marissa Rivera was born in Seoul, South Korea to Puerto Rican parents. After a knee injury in high school she chose to pursue acting and performing, going onto get a BA in Theatre from Florida State University. She has multiple acting credits on television shows, including Lucifer and Good Trouble, as well as numerous commercials. She joined the Try Guys cast in May 2024.

===== Miles =====
Miles Bonsignore is a member of the Try Guys. In June 2022, Bonsignore launched his own podcast, Perfect Person. In September 2023, he left 2nd Try LLC to focus on independent creative projects. In May 2024, he returned to the company as an official member of The Try Guys cast.

===== Ryan =====
Ryan Garcia is a member of the Try Guys. On stage, Garcia has performed in several Los Angeles productions, including Ravenswood Manor, Lottie Platchett Took a Hatchet, and FOUND the Musical. A close friend of original Try Guy Keith Habersberger, he became one of nine new official members of The Try Guys in May 2024.

===== YB =====
YB Chang Biste was born in Seoul, South Korea. She moved to the United States at the age of 12. From an early age, she developed an interest in creative storytelling, writing, and drawing comics. Her passion for visual storytelling grew in high school, where she began studying filmmaking and video editing. She later attended the University of Southern California School of Cinematic Arts, where she earned a degree in Film and Television Production.

In July 2018, she launched a self-titled YouTube channel. In May 2024, she became one of nine new official members of The Try Guys, following the departures of Ned Fulmer and Eugene Lee Yang from the group.

=== Former members ===
==== Eugene ====
Eugene Lee Yang (born January 18, 1986; Korean: 양유진) was born to Korean immigrants Jae Yang and Min-young Lee in Pflugerville, Texas. Yang graduated from the University of Southern California with a B.A. in Cinema Production. He regularly participates in LGBT pride events and has worked with The Trevor Project. Yang came out on June 15, 2019, in a YouTube video, "I'm Gay". In 2019, he announced that he has been in a long-term relationship with Matthew McLean. Despite still being listed as an official member, he has made increasingly infrequent appearances on the channel. In 2024, it was announced that Yang would only be doing one more season as part of the cast before stepping away for other projects, though he will still retain his co-ownership of the company.

==== Ned ====
Edward Gallo "Ned" Fulmer (born June 11, 1987) was born in Jacksonville, Florida. He graduated from Yale University with a major in chemistry. He had a career working in a chemistry lab before he had a career change and started working at Buzzfeed, where Fulmer developed the video fellowship program. He previously lived in Chicago, working at a renewable energy lab by day and performing improv and sketch for Second City and iO Chicago house teams by night, where he was named a "Critic's Pick" by Time Out Chicago.

He has two sons with Ariel Marie Fulmer (née VandeVoorde), an interior designer. The Verge highlighted that much of Fulmer's public persona "revolves around being a husband," and that he "successfully built a fanbase and brand around this relationship specifically," calling him a "wife guy." Fulmer was removed from the group in September 2022, following an extramarital affair with an employee. In September 2025, it was reported that Fulmer was separated from his wife and was launching a new podcast, Rock Bottom, for which she would appear as its debut guest.

== Episodes ==
=== Main series ===
Season	Episodes	Originally released		
Season	Episodes	First released	Last released	Network
1	7	September 12, 2014	January 25, 2015	BuzzFeed Video
2	12	February 11, 2015	May 10, 2015	BuzzFeed Video
3	12	May 17, 2015	August 4, 2015	BuzzFeed Video
4	11	August 12, 2015	October 29, 2015	BuzzFeed Video
5	11	November 1, 2015	March 6, 2016	BuzzFeed Video
6	12	March 16, 2016	September 12, 2016	BuzzFeed Video
7	11	September 24, 2016	March 19, 2017	BuzzFeed Video
8	11	March 26, 2017	June 17, 2017	BuzzFeed Video
9	23	July 22, 2017	February 10, 2018	BuzzFeed Video
10	370	June 17, 2018	Present	2nd Try LLC

=== Spin-offs ===
Over the series of The Try Guys episodes, particular episodes have branched off as part of series of a specific topic or mini-series.

Series			Originally Aired		Status
Name	Starring	Episodes	Start Date	Latest Date	Status
Motherhood	All	5	May 6, 2015	May 10, 2015	Ended
Cosplay	All	4	August 1, 2015	August 4, 2015	Ended
K-Pop	All	4	September 23, 2015	September 26, 2015	Ended
Santa Spectacular	All	3	December 18, 2015	December 20, 2015	Ended
Ocean Survival	All	3	June 16, 2016	June 18, 2016	Ended
Fatherhood	All	5	June 13, 2017	June 17, 2017	Ended
Eat The Menu	Keith	31	September 23, 2017	present	Airing
Without A Recipe	All	19	November 11, 2017	present	Airing
Dirty Tour	All	3	January 27, 2018	February 10, 2018	Ended
Parenthood	All	5	June 17, 2018	July 7, 2018	Ended
The Barkchshler	Keith	5	July 11, 2018	December 24, 2018	Ended
Candid Competition	Zach	11	July 25, 2018	present	Airing
Ned & Ariel	Ned & Ariel	4	August 1, 2018	March 16, 2019	Ended
The Try Guys: Game Time	All	16	August 8, 2018	present	Airing
Rank King	Eugene	12	August 18, 2018	present	Airing
DUI	All	4	October 17, 2018	October 27, 2018	Ended
The Try Wives: Wine Time	Ariel, Becky & Maggie	8	December 19, 2018	present	Airing
Old Age	All	4	April 3, 2019	April 13, 2019	Ended
The TryPod	All & Miles	100+	May 4, 2019	present	Airing
The Food Babies	Alexandria & YB	7	July 3, 2019	December 13, 2021	Ended
Try DIY	Ned & Ariel	3	July 17, 2019	July 31, 2019	Ended
4 Vs. 1	All	10	October 28, 2019	present	Airing
Try Australia	All	5	November 2, 2019	November 20, 2019	Ended
Without Instructions	All	7	February 8, 2020	Present	Airing
Beauty Month	All	4	March 7, 2020	March 28, 2020	Ended
#StayHome	All	27	March 16, 2020	July 29, 2020	Ended
Tea Time	Zach	6	May 13, 2020	August 24, 2020	Ended
Date Night	Ned & Ariel	4	May 16, 2020	June 8, 2022	Ended
Retry	All	3	July 15, 2020	Present	Airing
Tailgate Debate	Keith	3	November 14, 2020	Present	Airing

== Tour ==
On May 4, 2019, The Try Guys announced via YouTube that they would be embarking on a 20 city, nationwide tour (called “Legends of the Internet”) as a part of their “Summer of Try”. Then on July 30, 2019, The Try Guys announced they would be bringing Legends of The Internet to Australia and, later Singapore. Finally, on September 3, 2019, the group announced the final leg of the Legends of the Internet tour, this time in the Pacific Northwest (which was missed on the original run of the tour). In total, The Try Guys performed 26 shows of Legends of the Internet worldwide. In April 2024, the Try Guys announced the Eat The Menu Tour, a tour based around the Eat The Menu series.

Title	Dates	# of Cities
Legends of the Internet	June 21, 2019 – July 28, 2019; October 15, 2019 – October 17, 2019	23
Legends of the Internet (International)	September 23, 2019, September 24, 2019, September 28, 2019	3
Eat The Menu Tour	August 8, 2024 – August 10, 2024; September 19, 2024 – September 21, 2024; October 2, 2024 – October 4, 2024	6

=== Legends of the Internet ===
Date	City	Country	Venue
June 21, 2019	Los Angeles, CA	United States	The Wiltern
June 22, 2019	Phoenix, AZ	United States	Comerica Theatre
June 24, 2019	Denver, CO	United States	Paramount Theatre
June 25, 2019	Kansas City, MO	United States	Uptown Theatre
June 26, 2019	Minneapolis, MN	United States	State Theatre
June 27, 2019	Chicago, IL	United States	Chicago Theatre
June 28, 2019	Milwaukee, WI	United States	Pabst Theatre
June 29, 2019	Detroit, MI	United States	The Fillmore Detroit
June 30, 2019	Cleveland, OH	United States	KeyBank State Theatre at Playhouse Square
July 10, 2019	San Jose, CA	United States	City National Civic
July 14, 2019	San Diego, CA	United States	Balboa Theatre
July 18, 2019	Irving, TX	United States	Toyota Music Factory
July 19, 2019	San Antonio, TX	United States	Majestic Theatre
July 20, 2019	Austin, TX	United States	Bass Concert Hall
July 21, 2019	Houston, TX	United States	Revention Music Center
July 23, 2019	Atlanta, GA	United States	Tabernacle
July 25, 2019	Washington, DC	United States	Warner Theatre
July 26, 2019	New York, NY	United States	Beacon Theatre
July 27, 2019	Boston, MA	United States	Shubert Theatre
July 28, 2019	Philadelphia, PA	United States	The Met
September 23, 2019	Melbourne	Australia	Athenaeum Theatre
September 24, 2019	Sydney	Australia	Big Top
September 28, 2019	Singapore	Singapore	The Star Theatre
October 15, 2019	Portland, OR	United States	Arlene Schnitzer Concert Hall
October 16, 2019	Vancouver, BC	Canada	The Centre
October 17, 2019	Seattle, WA	United States	Moore Theatre

=== Eat The Menu Tour ===
Date	City	Country	Venue
August 8, 2024	Atlanta, Georgia	United States	Buckhead Theatre
August 10, 2024	Brooklyn, New York	United States	Brooklyn Paramount
September 19, 2024	Philadelphia, Pennsylvania	United States	The Filmore Philadelphia
September 21, 2024	Washington, D.C.	United States	Warner Theatre
October 2, 2024	Los Angeles, California	United States	The Wiltern
October 4, 2024	El Cajon, California	United States	The Magnolia

== Awards ==
Year	Title	Nominated	Award	Result
2016	Streamy Awards	The Try Guys	Nonfiction Channel, Show, or Series	Won
2016	Streamy Awards	The Try Guys	Show of the Year	Nominated
2017	Streamy Awards	The Try Guys	Performance: Ensemble Cast	Nominated
2017	Streamy Awards	The Try Guys	Show of the Year	Nominated
2017	Webby Awards	The Try Guys	Comedy: Long Form or Series	Honoree
2017	Webby Awards	Try Guys // Sponsored by Sony's The Shallows	Unscripted (Branded)	Honoree
2018	Webby Awards	The Try Guys Shave Their Dads • Fatherhood: Part 4	Unscripted (Branded) – People's Voice	Won
2018	Streamy Awards	The Try Guys	Show of the Year	Won
2019	11th Shorty Awards	The Try Guys	Best YouTube Ensemble	Won
2020	Webby Awards	The Trypod (2nd Try)	Comedy, People's voice winner	Won
2021	Streamy Awards	Leftovers Roulette by The Try Guys, Kroger Zero Hunger, Zero Waste Foundation	Social Impact Campaign	Won
2026	Webby Awards	Try Guys Try Ghost Hunting	Creators - Best Creator-to-Creator Collaboration	Won
2026	Webby Awards	Drop Into City	Creators - Home & Travel	Won
2026	Webby Awards	Phoning It In	Creators - Best Editing	Nominated
