= Squad Wars =

American web comedy series on YouTube Premium

- Genre: Comedy
- Starring: Eugene Lee Yang; Ned Fulmer; Keith Habersberger; Zach Kornfeld
- Country of origin: United States
- Original language: English
- No. of seasons: 1
- No. of episodes: 9

Production
- Executive producers: Eugene Lee Yang; Ned Fulmer; Keith Habersberger; Zach Kornfeld; Mike Kurtz
- Producer: Kulali C. Epwell
- Camera setup: Single-camera
- Running time: 25 minutes

Original release
- Network: YouTube Red
- Release: January 26 – March 23, 2017

Squad Wars is an American comedy television series produced exclusively for YouTube Red, featuring The Try Guys and other Internet personalities. The series premiered on January 26, 2017. The season finale was released on March 23, 2017. The 9 episodes, 25-minute-long series is produced by Buzzfeed Motion Pictures.

The reality competition series features new teams and new challenges.

== Episodes ==
=== Season 1 ===
No.	Title	Release date
1	American Ninja Warrior Vs. Project Runway. Pirate Stunt Show	January 26, 2017
2	Dormtainment Vs. Harvard Sailing Team. Synchronized Swimming	February 2, 2017
3	"Girl Code Vs. Madd Chadd & Poppin John. NASCAR Pit Crew"	February 9, 2017
4	RuPaul's Drag Race Vs. UFC Fighters. Cowboy Up	February 16, 2017
5	"The Try Guys 90s Boyband Music Video Challenge"	February 26, 2017
6	" Big Time Rush Vs. DK4L. Pro Wrestling"	March 2, 2017
7	"The Dudesons Vs. Funhaus. Local Newscast"	March 9, 2017
8	" Rebecca Black & Vs. Million Dollar Listing"	March 16, 2017
9	"The Try Guys Vs. Dormtainment. Action Movie Stunts"	March 23, 2017
