= Barely Lethal =

2015 American action comedy film by Kyle Newman

- Theatrical release poster
- Directed by: Kyle Newman
- Written by: John D'Arco
- Produced by: John Cheng; Sukee Chew; Vanessa Coifman; Ted Hartley; Brett Ratner
- Starring: Hailee Steinfeld; Thomas Mann; Sophie Turner; Dove Cameron; Jessica Alba; Samuel L. Jackson
- Cinematography: Peter Lyons Collister
- Edited by: Lisa Zeno Churgin
- Music by: Mateo Messina
- Production companies: Main Street Films; RKO Pictures; RatPac Entertainment; Hopscotch Pictures; 120db Films; Highland Film Group; Windowseat Entertainment
- Distributed by: A24; DirecTV Cinema
- Release date: May 29, 2015 (United States)
- Running time: 98 minutes
- Country: United States
- Language: English
- Budget: $15 million
- Box office: $933,847

Barely Lethal is a 2015 American action comedy film directed by Kyle Newman, written by John D'Arco, starring Hailee Steinfeld, Thomas Mann, Sophie Turner, Dove Cameron, Jessica Alba, and Samuel L. Jackson. Steinfeld stars as Agent 83/Megan, a teenage intelligence agent yearning for a normal adolescence who disappears and enrolls as an exchange student in a suburban American high school.

Barely Lethal received a digital release through DirecTV Cinema on April 30, 2015, and a limited release in theaters by A24 and through video-on-demand on May 29, 2015. The film received mostly negative reviews from critics.

== Plot ==
The young female orphans in the government-run Prescott Academy are trained to become field operatives. Their number one rule taught by trainer Hardman is "no attachments". Agent 83's top skills are rivaled by Agent 84. 83 is curious about the world, learning teen culture through magazines and watching Mean Girls and Beverly Hills, 90210.

Hardman assigns the orphans to capture Victoria Knox, an arms dealer. Undercover in Chechnya, 83 poses as one of those captured and brought before her. She latches herself and Knox onto Hardman's passing jet but 83 drops into a river as Knox is apprehended, causing Hardman to declare her missing. 83 adopts the name Megan Walsh, poses as a Canadian student, and arrives in Newtown, Connecticut to live with her host family, the Larsons. Mrs. Larson and her son, Parker, welcome Megan, but Liz, her daughter, is cold and distant. Megan is mocked at school, leaving both her and Liz embarrassed. She soon makes friends with Roger Marcus, a classmate, and becomes attracted to Cash Fenton, a popular student, hacking the school's system to assign him as her biology lab partner.

Cindy and Donna, popular bullies, convince Megan to try out as the school mascot. When students from a rival school follow tradition and try to kidnap Newton High's mascot from a game, she fights them off, with a video of her actions going viral. It earns her some popularity while annoying Liz. Later, Megan is apprehended by a Prescott agent and brought to Hardman. He assumes she is working with their enemies, but she reveals she wanted to enjoy normal life outside the academy, leading to Hardman letting her go with a warning. Megan and Liz both attend a house party hosted by the school's class clown, Gooch. Megan hangs out with Cash, while Liz gets drunk and begins to bond with Gooch and learns that his real name is Bernard, as 84 arrives at the party, calling herself Heather. Megan assumes Hardman sent Heather to shadow her, but Heather denies this and tries to seduce Cash to irritate her. Megan eventually wins Cash's attention and gets asked by him to the homecoming dance.

The next morning, Hardman warns Megan that Knox has escaped from the academy. Liz drives her to school, but they are pursued by a masked assassin. Megan reveals her secret to her and crashes the two cars, but the assassin escapes. Megan recognizes the smell of perfume, identifying Heather. The two leave for the hospital, where Roger and Gooch visit the girls separately. At the homecoming dance, Megan becomes bored by Cash and leaves him before making amends with Roger. However, Heather reveals herself as Roger's date, provoking a fight between her and Megan. She further discloses she joined Knox's operation in order to get a chance to kill Megan. Liz sneaks up on Heather and stabs her in the leg and the two escape.

Megan and Liz return home to find that Knox and her mercenaries have seized Mrs. Larson and Parker as hostages. Knox reveals that she was Prescott Agent 1, but she left and turned against them for robbing her of her life. Hardman comes in with reinforcements and subdues Knox and her mercenaries. Megan uses a Prescott helicopter to stop Roger, who is driving home. She tells Roger her true feelings for him and the two kiss before joining Liz and Gooch in the helicopter.

In a mid-credits scene, Heather meets with a former henchman of Knox and orders him to find out where Megan is going to college.

== Cast ==
- Hailee Steinfeld as Megan Walsh/83
  - Madeleine Stack as Megan (age 8)
- Jessica Alba as Victoria Knox
- Samuel L. Jackson as Hardman
- Thomas Mann as Roger Marcus
- Sophie Turner as Heather/84
  - Eva Cooper as Heather (age 8)
- Dove Cameron as Liz Larson
- Toby Sebastian as Cash Fenton
- Gabriel Basso as Gooch
- Rob Huebel as Mr. Marcus
- Jaime King as Analyst Knight
- Rachael Harris as Mrs. Larson
- Jason Drucker as Parker Larson
- Alexandra Krosney as Cindy
- Emma Holzer as Donna
- Dan Fogler as Mr. Drumm
- Finesse Mitchell as Principal Weissman
- Christopher Nathan Miller as Fred the Freshman
- Steve-O as Pedro

== Production ==
=== Filming ===
Principal photography began in Atlanta, Georgia in November 2013 and ended in December.

=== Post-production ===
On July 7, 2014, it was announced that Mateo Messina would be scoring the music for the film. The film originally received an R rating by the Motion Picture Association of America (MPAA), but the filmmakers appealed for PG-13 rating without having to cut or edit any scenes. The film is now rated PG-13 on appeal for "sexual material, teen drinking, language, drug references, and some action violence".

The film debuts the original song "You Don't Know Me", performed by The Rumor Mill with Chetti, which plays over the opening title sequence.

== Release ==
On February 25, 2015, the film was acquired by A24 and DirecTV before being released in theaters and on-demand with a planned release in 2015 by A24. The film was released on DirecTV Cinema on April 30, 2015. The film was released in a limited release and through video on demand beginning on May 29, 2015. The film was released in the United Kingdom on August 28, 2015, in select cinemas and was released through video-on-demand and on DVD and Blu-ray on October 26, 2015, by Signature Entertainment.

=== Home media ===
The film was released on DVD and Blu-ray on August 4, 2015, by Lionsgate Home Entertainment. Both contained an UltraViolet digital copy of the film. Special features included deleted scenes, a behind-the-scenes featurette titled "Back to School: On Set with Barely Lethal" and an audio commentary with director Kyle Newman and actors Dove Cameron and Thomas Mann.

== Reception ==
On Rotten Tomatoes, the film holds an approval rating of 26% based on 35 reviews, and an average rating of 4.3/10. The website's critical consensus states: "Just like its underserved protagonist, Barely Lethal is in disguise -- it wants you to think it's smarter than it is but it fails by falling prey to all the clichés it mocks". On Metacritic, the film has a weighted average scored 44 out of 100, based on 10 critics, indicating "mixed or average" reviews.

Rebecca Keegan of the Los Angeles Times gave the film a poor review, commenting that: "Barely Lethal is clearly confused about its intended audience, starting with the icky title, a pun on the porn label that selects and photographs models to emphasize their youth." Justin Lowe of The Hollywood Reporter gave the film a more positive review, calling it a "fun-enough teen action comedy." Bill Goodykoontz of The Arizona Republic gave the film a mixed review saying that: Barely Lethal has some laughs, and will probably serve nicely as a movie you can land on for a few minutes when it shows up on cable. But it slides into the rote generic-teen-comedy mode too soon to be anything more.'

== Score ==
Barely Lethal (Original Motion Picture Soundtrack)

Film score by Mateo Messina
- Released: June 9, 2015
- Recorded: 2015
- Genre: Soundtrack
- Length: 33:07
- Label: Lakeshore Records

The original motion picture soundtrack for Barely Lethal was released on June 9, 2015, by Lakeshore Records. The album features the film's original music composed by Mateo Messina. The album does not contain "You Don't Know Me", performed by The Rumor Mill with Chetti, an original song for the film. The song does appear in the opening title sequence of the film.

Barely Lethal (Original Motion Picture Soundtrack)
| No. | Title | Length |
|---|---|---|
| 1. | "Prescott" | 0:46 |
| 2. | "Fight Club" | 1:43 |
| 3. | "Oh Canada" | 0:34 |
| 4. | "Battle Axe" | 0:50 |
| 5. | "Victoria Knox" | 2:30 |
| 6. | "Band Ass" | 0:26 |
| 7. | "Last Chance" | 1:01 |
| 8. | "Hs Transition" | 0:18 |
| 9. | "Truth Serum A" | 2:09 |
| 10. | "Truth Serum B" | 2:23 |
| 11. | "Car Chase" | 2:56 |
| 12. | "Number One" | 3:40 |
| 13. | "Douche Baguette" | 3:28 |
| 14. | "White Van" | 0:37 |
| 15. | "Newton Suite" | 1:15 |
| 16. | "Megan & Roger Suite" | 1:55 |
| 17. | "Bad Guys" | 0:47 |
| 18. | "True Liz" | 1:06 |
| 19. | "High School" | 0:18 |
| 20. | "Higher School" | 0:15 |
| 21. | "Holes" | 0:31 |
| 22. | "Nearly Chanced" | 1:05 |
| 23. | "Popcorn" | 0:51 |
| 24. | "Helichopper" | 0:57 |
| 25. | "Prescott Reprise" | 0:46 |
| Total length: | | 33:07 |

== See also ==
- Kill Me Baby
