= Matt Stopera =

Senior editor at BuzzFeed

Matt Stopera is an American journalist and senior editor at BuzzFeed. He is best known for an article he wrote in 2015 about a Chinese man who had received Stopera's stolen cell phone and posted dozens of photos of an orange tree which appeared on his iPhone's photo stream.

When he was 14, he appeared on an episode of MTV's Fanography to talk about his obsession with Britney Spears. Stopera attended college at NYU and majored in Communications. "I originally wanted to go to school for journalism because I thought it was cool or something. I took the intro class and HATED it, so I decided to do Comm because there were a bunch of classes about pop culture, which is what I really like. I quickly learned you didn’t have to go to school for journalism to write," he explained.

Stopera began his online media career as an intern at BuzzFeed in August 2008. The website was still in its infancy, with only two other editorial employees on staff. Stopera has since written thousands of listicles for the site, many of them 1990s nostalgia themed, which inspired former Gawker editor Max Read to call Stopera BuzzFeed's "chief 90s-rememberer." Many of his stories like “25 Extremely Upsetting Reactions to Chris Brown at the Grammys," “40 Things That Will Make You Feel Old," and “the 45 Most Powerful Images of 2011" garnered millions of page views, which led BusinessWeek to suggest he had "broken a code." However, a report by Gawker found that many of his posts were later taken down. Ben Smith said that the deleted posts were “corrected” after Gawker pointed out, in 2012, that they insufficiently credited other websites.

Stopera lives in Alphabet City with actress Ilana Glazer, whom he met in his first week of college and has lived with ever since.

== Brother Orange ==
In February 2014, Stopera lost his iPhone in a New York City bar. After buying a new one, he noticed bizarre images of a Chinese man posing next to a grove of orange trees, which were taken on his stolen phone. After writing a story about his experience on BuzzFeed, users on the Chinese social media site Weibo helped track down the man who took the photos. Stopera met the man in China, who was dubbed "Brother Orange" by Chinese social media.
