= The Take (YouTube channel) =

YouTube channel and media company

YouTube information
- Channel: The Take
- Years active: 2016–present
- Genre: Video essay
- Subscribers: 1.52 million
- Views: 465 million
- Last updated: 22 October 2025
- Website: the-take.com

The Take (previously named ScreenPrism) is a YouTube channel and media company. Co-founded and hosted by Yale University alumni Susannah McCullough and Debra Minoff, The Take produces video essays analyzing film, television and popular culture at large. As of July 2025, The Take's Youtube channel has over 1.5 million subscribers and over 457 million video views.

The Take is known for its "All the Tropes" series, a collection of video essays dissecting character tropes including the "cool girl", the "smart girl", the child prodigy, the white savior and the Manic Pixie Dream Girl. The Take has also created the video series The Takeaway with Amazon Prime Video, the series Take Two in collaboration with Netflix, and produced a series of Oscar videos for Entertainment Weekly.

The Take's video on Breaking Bad's Walter White was listed by Film School Rejects as one of 2018's best video essays. "Parasite, Ending Explained: Stairway to Nowhere" was named among the top video essays of 2020 by No Film School. The Take’s video essays have also received coverage from The Mary Sue, Bustle and The A.V. Club.
