= Jonah Peretti =

American businessman (born 1974)

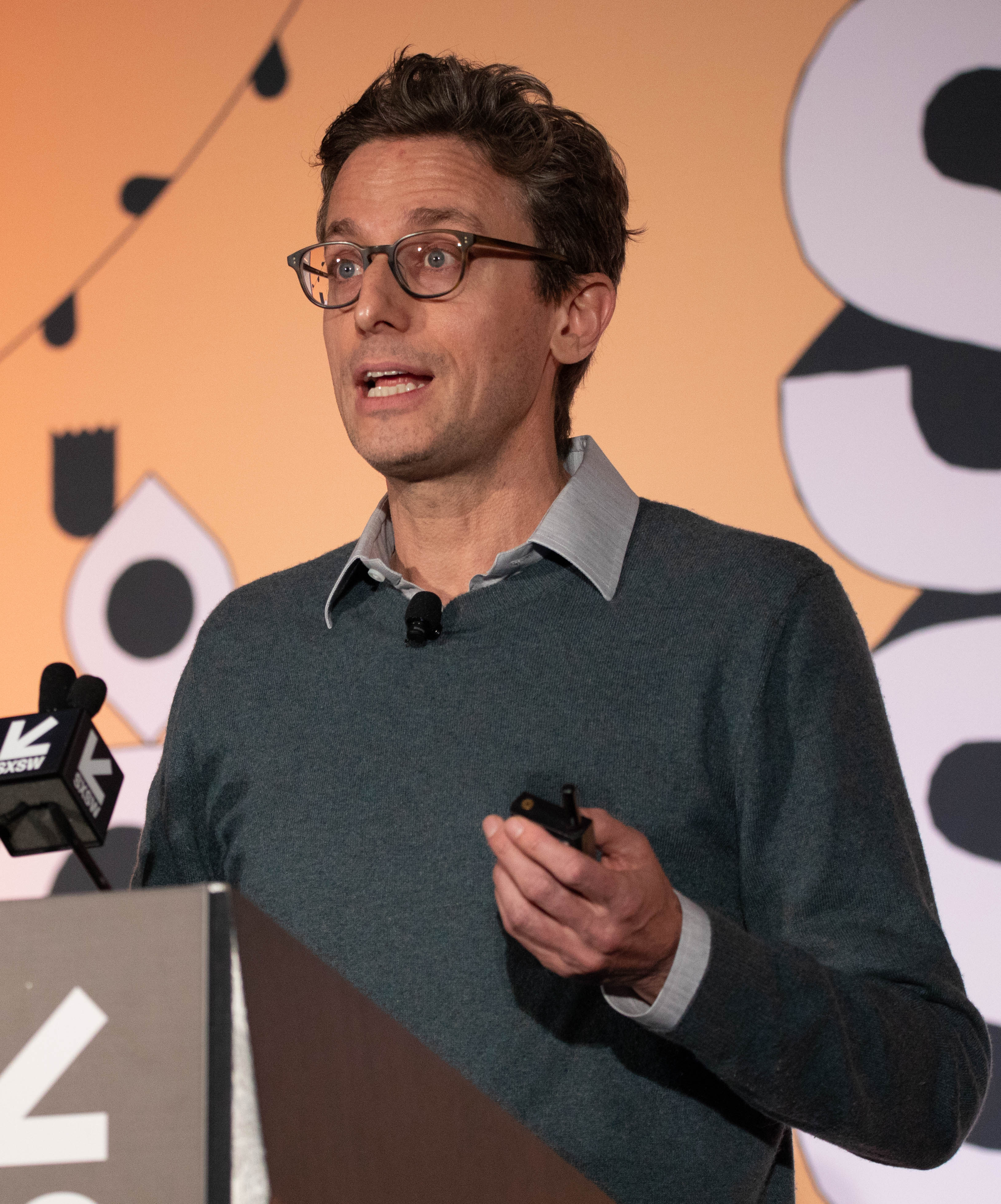
- Peretti in 2019
- Born: January 1, 1974 (age 52); Contra Costa County, California, U.S.
- Education: University of California, Santa Cruz (BS); Massachusetts Institute of Technology (MS)
- Employer(s): Contagious Media (2001–2006); The Huffington Post (2005–2011); BuzzFeed (2006–present)
- Known for: BuzzFeed, The Huffington Post
- Spouse: Andrea Harner
- Children: 2
- Relatives: Chelsea Peretti (sister); Jordan Peele (brother-in-law)
- Website: buzzfeed.com/jonah

Jonah H. Peretti (born January 1, 1974) is an American internet entrepreneur. He is a co-founder and former CEO of BuzzFeed, a co-founder of HuffPost, and a developer of reblogging under the project "Reblog".

== Early life ==
Peretti was born in California, and raised in Oakland. His father, a criminal defense lawyer and painter, is of Italian and English descent and his mother (née Cherkin), a schoolteacher, is Jewish. His stepmother was African-American. He attended The College Preparatory School in Oakland, followed by the University of California, Santa Cruz, where he graduated with a degree in environmental studies in 1996. He taught computer science classes at Isidore Newman School in New Orleans, in the mid-1990s. He received a master's degree from the MIT Media Lab in 2001.

While at MIT, his email exchange with Nike over a request to print "sweatshop" on custom order shoes went viral.

== Career ==
After graduating from the University of California, Santa Cruz in 1996, Peretti published an article titled "Capitalism and Schizophrenia" (Note: Note that this article discusses 'schizophrenia' in the sense used in cultural theory, where it refers to somebody with a weakly defined personal identity.) in Negations, a Texas-based journal of critical theory. The paper compares the text Postmodernism and Consumer Society, by Fredric Jameson, with Deleuze and Guattari's Anti-Oedipus (along with discussing works by Jacques Lacan, Roland Barthes and Jean Laplanche) to demonstrate the "psychological link between one-dimensionality and advertising". It explains Peretti's ideas around viral marketing, and offers examples of how anti-capitalist critique can be easily integrated into capitalism.

Peretti co-founded The Huffington Post along with Kenneth Lerer, Andrew Breitbart and Arianna Huffington in 2005. He left The Huffington Post in 2011 after it was bought by AOL for $315 million.

Peretti founded the "Internet popularity contest" site BuzzFeed in November 2006. After leaving The Huffington Post, Peretti began working at BuzzFeed full-time. While originally known for its mix of internet memes and listicles, the site was the first to break the news that John McCain would endorse Mitt Romney in the 2012 Republican primary. The site continued to grow afterward, raising over $35 million in funding from investors the next year. In August 2014, the site raised another $50 million from the venture capital firm Andreessen Horowitz, more than doubling its previous rounds of funding. The site was valued at $850 million by Andreessen Horowitz.

In 2019, Peretti announced that BuzzFeed would be cutting its overall workforce by 15 percent. Peretti said he wanted to reduce costs without resorting to additional fundraising. Its remaining workforce then officially unionized, their first successful fight being over laid-off staffers getting their earned paid time off.

In 2021 at a virtual company meeting, Peretti, as BuzzFeed's chief executive, fired 47 employees at HuffPost in a controversial manner, sending a virtual meeting password "spr!ngisH3r3" to laid-off employees. The HuffPost Union, which is affiliated with the Writers Guild of America East, said in a statement that the layoffs had affected 33 of its members, nearly a third of the local union.

In 2022, shareholders urged Peretti to shut down BuzzFeed News; two anonymous sources told CNBC that BuzzFeed News lost about $10 million annually. On April 20, 2023, BuzzFeed under Peretti laid off 15% of its staff and shut down the BuzzFeed News division. In an email to staff on April 20, Peretti stated that the company overinvested in BuzzFeed News "because I love their work and mission so much".

== Personal life ==
He is the elder brother of comedian, actress and writer Chelsea Peretti. He is married to blogger Andrea Harner, with whom he has twin sons.
