= Richard Alan Reid =

British producer and director

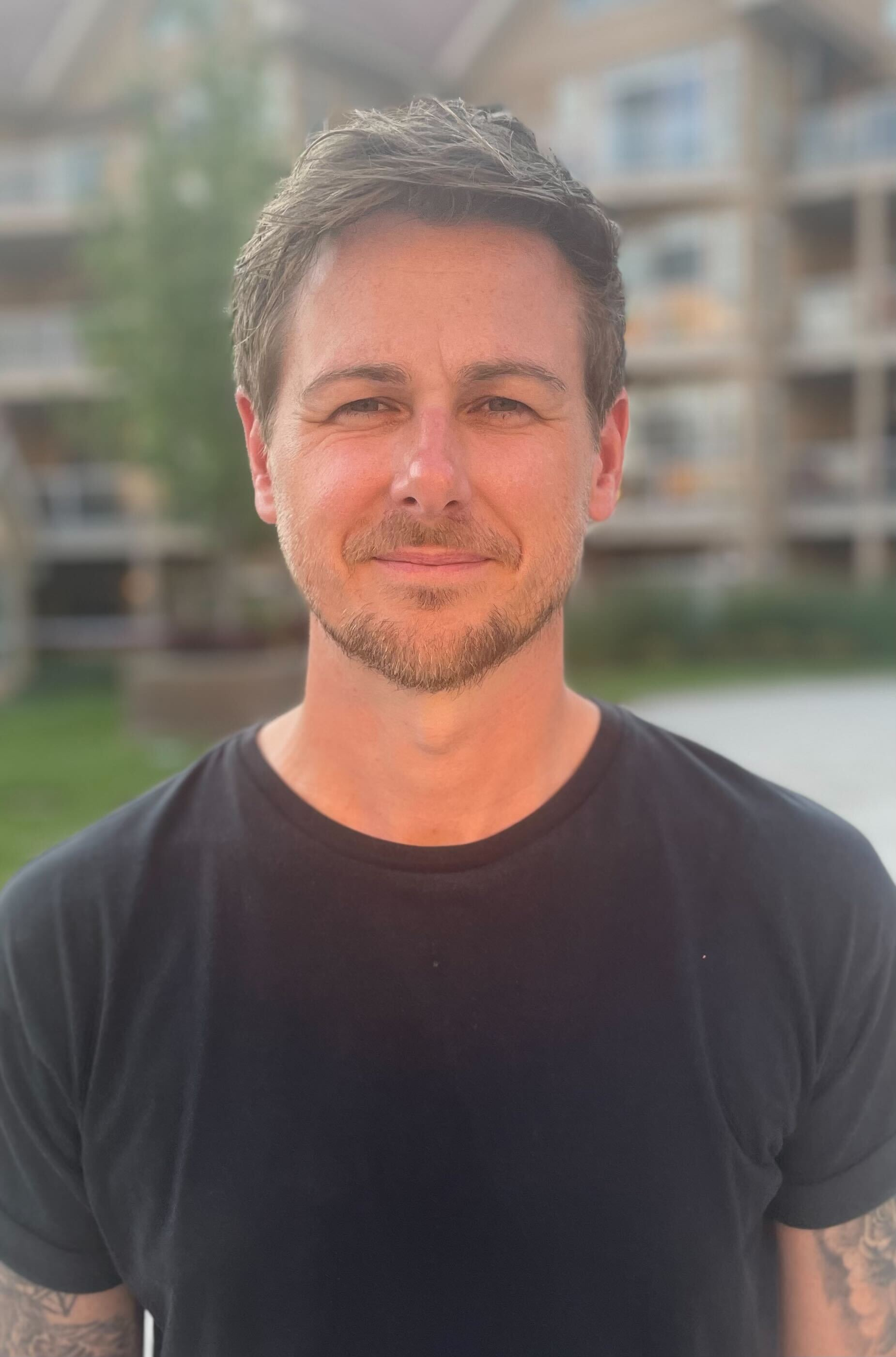
- Reid in 2024
- Born: 29 September 1984 (age 42)
- Education: University of Sussex; New York Film Academy; University of California, Santa Barbara
- Occupations: Producer, director, media executive
- Years active: 2001–present
- Website: www.richardreid.net

Richard Alan Reid (born 29 September 1984) is a British film and television producer, director and media executive. He currently serves as President of BuzzFeed Studios, overseeing digital video, social media, film, television, audio and distribution for BuzzFeed, Tasty, Complex Networks, HuffPost and more.

== Early life and education ==
Reid grew up in Berkshire, where he attended Reading Blue Coat School and Redroofs Theatre School. He joined the National Youth Theatre. He graduated from the University of Sussex, New York Film Academy, and the University of California, Santa Barbara.

== Career ==
Reid's feature film credits include Puppy Love which he co-directed, produced and co-wrote for Lionsgate, MGM and Amazon Studios, EXmas with Leighton Meester and Robbie Amell, F*** Marry Kill starring Lucy Hale, Book of Love with Sam Claflin and Veronica Echegui, 1Up with Ruby Rose for Lionsgate, Amazon's My Fake Boyfriend with Sarah Hyland and Dylan Sprouse, One True Loves with Phillipa Soo, Simu Liu and Luke Bracey, Paramount's The Black Demon with Josh Lucas, Lionsgate's Fall, the Renny Harlin-directed horror film Devil's Pass, Frat Pack, Accidental Love with Jake Gyllenhaal and Jessica Biel, Fear of Rain as well as The End of Us and Recovery, both of which premiered at the 2021 South By Southwest Film Festival.

Reid's television credits include NBC's Girls Gone Wild: The Untold Story, The Rise and Fall of Lularoe for Discovery+, the highly acclaimed Once Upon A Time A Londongrad for NBCUniversal, Worth It: UK which he also directed, and Snoop & Martha's Very Tasty Halloween on Peacock.

Formerly an actor, Reid's acting credits include Love, Wedding, Marriage, William & Kate: The Movie, Tulip Fever with Christoph Waltz, Criminal with Kevin Costner, Sony Pictures' Austenland, which was part of the 2013 Sundance Film Festival, The Legend of Hercules, There's Always Woodstock, The Brits Are Coming with Uma Thurman, and The Weinstein Company's Woman in Gold with Helen Mirren and Ryan Reynolds.

Reid served as Vice President of Film & TV at K.Jam Media (Lucky Number Slevin, Sin City: A Dame to Kill For, Lord of War) and Executive Vice President, Development at Sunrise Films (Father of Invention, The Whistleblower). He is currently Head of BuzzFeed Studios, which produces original content across broadcast, cable, SVOD, film, digital and social platforms. BuzzFeed Studios is the home of many brands such as BuzzFeed, Complex Networks, Hot Ones, BuzzFeed Unsolved, Tasty, Celeb, Animation Lab and HuffPost. He has led many thought leadership keynotes on the subjects of Creativity and content creation in the digital age. He has directed advertising campaigns for brands including GEICO, Coca-Cola, BMW, Citibank, and Amazon.
