= Kyle Newman =

American filmmaker and author (born 1976)

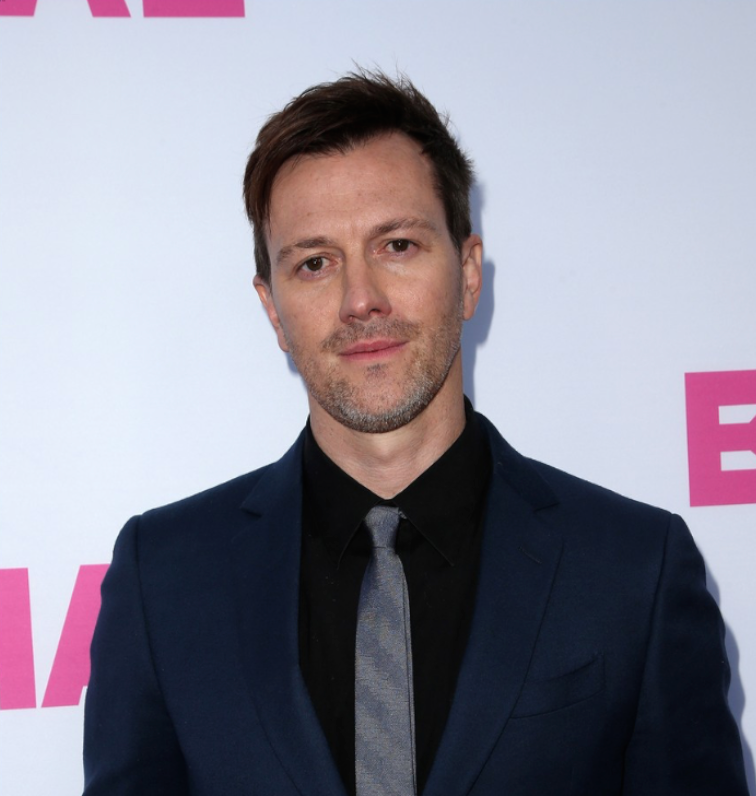
- Newman in 2015
- Born: March 16, 1976 (age 50); Morristown, New Jersey, U.S.
- Education: New York University Tisch School of the Arts
- Occupations: Film director, producer, screenwriter, author, editor, actor
- Spouse: Jaime King (m. 2007; div. 2023)
- Partner: Cyn (2020–present)
- Children: 4

Kyle Newman (born March 16, 1976) is an American filmmaker, actor and author. He is best known for directing Fanboys (2009), and has since directed Barely Lethal (2015), and 1Up (2022).

== Early life and education ==
Newman was born in 1976 in New Jersey. He has a brother named Kevin, who went on to work as a character designer for The Simpsons.

He is an honors graduate of New York University's School of Film/TV and the receipt of the Martin Scorsese Award for "Excellence in Directing". In 1998, Newman's short film Bitten by Love won the Coca-Cola Refreshing Filmmaker's Award while he was a student at New York University.

== Career ==
=== Film ===
In 2006, Newman began production on Fanboys, a Star Wars-themed comedy starring Jay Baruchel, Dan Fogler and Sam Huntington. Initially set for release in August 2007, it was pushed back to January 2008 as Newman was given more funding to shoot addition scenes. However, reuniting the cast would only be possible that September, so it was pushed back again to early 2008. By the end of the year, Newman was not involved in reshoots, and the scenes were directed by Steven Brill. The film was eventually released in February 2009 to poor reviews. Newman later directed Barely Lethal for A24, which starred Hailee Steinfeld and Samuel L. Jackson, as well as 1Up for Lionsgate and Prime Video, a comedy set in the world of competitive esports starring Ruby Rose. He is set to direct a documentary for Hasbro, exploring the fifty-year history of Dungeons & Dragons.

In 2016, Newman produced Raiders!: The Story of the Greatest Fan Film Ever Made, a documentary about three teenagers who set out to recreate Steven Spielberg's classic Raiders of the Lost Ark shot-for-shot in 1982, which was distributed by Drafthouse Films. He reteamed with director Jeremy Coon and Fanboys scribe Adam F. Goldberg to produce A Disturbance in the Force, a documentary about the making of The Star Wars Holiday Special. He is the co-creator, co-story writer of the Netflix Original animated feature film Gnome Alone. Newman also executive produced Happily, alongside Jack Black.

=== Other work ===
2018 saw the release of his first book Art & Arcana: A Visual History via Ten Speed Press/Penguin Random House in association with Wizards of the Coast. It received nominations for a Locus Award, a Diana Jones Award, and a Hugo Award. Newman's second book Heroes' Feast: The Official Dungeons & Dragons Cookbook published in October 2020 by Ten Speed Press/Penguin Random House in association with Wizards of the Coast, reunited the author team and became a New York Times bestseller and was adapted into a cooking show titled Heroes' Feast for Hasbro. In 2023, sequels to both books were published by Ten Speed Press/Penguin Random House. Dungeons & Dragons: Lore & Legends tells the story of D&D's 5th Edition and Heroes' Feast: Flavors of the Multiverse is the planet-hopping follow-up cookbook.

Newman has directed music videos for artists including Taylor Swift ("Style", "Clean"), Lana Del Rey ("Summertime Sadness") and Cyn ("House With A View", "Losing Sleep"), and created the video content for Swift's The 1989 World Tour.

== Personal life ==
In 2006, while working on the set of Fanboys, he met actress and former model Jaime King. Newman proposed in spring 2007, and the two married on November 23, 2007 in an "intimate and relaxed" ceremony in Los Angeles at Greystone Park and Manor, where Newman had proposed. Newman and King have two sons together; Taylor Swift is godmother to their second son.

In May 2020, King filed for divorce from Newman after 13 years of marriage. King also filed a domestic violence prevention petition and was granted a temporary restraining order against Newman, which was later withdrawn as Newman was eventually awarded sole physical custody of their sons and King was mandated to complete a 6-month substance rehabilitation program. The divorce was finalized in September 2023.

Newman has a son and daughter with his wife, singer-songwriter Cyn.

Newman is a supporter of Premier League club Arsenal.

== Filmography ==
=== Short film ===
| Year | Title | Director | Producer | Writer | Editor | Notes |
|---|---|---|---|---|---|---|
| 1999 | The Cyclist | Yes | Yes | Yes | Yes | |
| 1998 | Bitten by Love | Yes | Yes | Yes | Yes | |
| 2000 | Drone | Yes | Yes | Yes | No | |
| 2008 | The Cube | Yes | No | Yes | No | Made for Microsoft |
| 2012 | Latch Key | No | Yes | No | No | Role: Mr. Kyle |

=== Feature film ===
Director

| Year | Title | Notes |
|---|---|---|
| 2004 | The Hollow | Television film; Role: Cool High School Dude |
| 2009 | Fanboys | Also editor (Uncredited) |
| 2015 | Barely Lethal | |
| 2022 | 1Up | Role: Iggy, Kong Coach |
| TBA | Untitled Vigilante Project | Also writer and producer |

Story writer

- Gnome Alone (2017)

Executive producer

- Happily (2021)

=== Documentary works ===
Short film

| Year | Title | Director | Writer | Producer |
|---|---|---|---|---|
| 2004 | Artflick.001 | Yes | Yes | No |
| 2013 | The Return of Return of the Jedi: 30 Years and Counting | Yes | Yes | Yes |

Film

| Year | Title | Director | Producer | Himself |
|---|---|---|---|---|
| 2013 | Ralph McQuarrie: Tribute to a Master | No | Associate | Yes |
| 2015 | Raiders!: The Story of the Greatest Fan Film Ever Made | No | Executive | No |
| 2023 | A Disturbance in the Force | No | Yes | Yes |
| TBA | Untitled Dungeons & Dragons documentary | Yes | Executive | No |

=== Other works ===
Theatre

| Year | Title | Director | Producer | Writer |
|---|---|---|---|---|
| 2012 | Star Wars: Smuggler's Gambit – Live Stage Show | Yes | Yes | Yes |
| 2015 | Star Wars: Smuggler's Bounty – Live Stage Show | Yes | Yes | Yes |
| 2017 | Star Wars: Smuggler's Revenge – Live Stage Show | Yes | Yes | Yes |

Motion comic

| Year | Title | Notes |
|---|---|---|
| 2009–2010 | Spartacus: Blood and Sand | 2 episodes |
| 2010 | The Crazies | 4 episodes |

Music video

| Year | Title | Artist | Notes |
|---|---|---|---|
| 2010 | "Bury Me Alive" | We Are the Fallen | |
| 2012 | "Bel Air" | Lana Del Rey | |
| 2012 | "Summertime Sadness" | Lana Del Rey | Co-directed with Spencer Susser |
| 2015 | "31 Seconds" | Jaime King & J. Ralph | |
| 2015 | "Style" | Taylor Swift | |
| 2015 | "Clean" (for The 1989 World Tour) | Taylor Swift | |
| 2022 | "House With A View" | Cyn | |
| 2023 | "Losing Sleep" | Cyn | |
| 2023 | "Clean (Taylor's Version)" | Taylor Swift | |

== Bibliography ==
- Witwer, Michael; Witwer, Sam; Newman, Kyle; Peterson, Jon (2018). Dungeons & Dragons: Art & Arcana - A Visual History. Ten Speed Press. ISBN 978-0399580949.
- Witwer, Michael; Newman, Kyle; Peterson, Jon (2020). Heroes' Feast: The Official D&D Cookbook. Ten Speed Press. ISBN 978-1984858900.
- Witwer, Michael; Witwer, Sam; Newman, Kyle; Peterson, Jon (2023). Heroes' Feast Flavors of the Multiverse: An Official D&D Cookbook. Ten Speed Press. ISBN 978-1984861313.
- Witwer, Michael; Newman, Kyle (2023). Dungeons & Dragons: Lore & Legends - A Visual Celebration of the Fifth Edition of the World's Greatest Roleplaying Game. Ten Speed Press. ISBN 978-1984862464.
