= Adam Ellis (artist) =

American artist (born 1986)

- Born: Adam Ellis; October 1, 1986 (age 39); Montana, U.S.
- Education: Art Institute of Boston (BA in Illustration)
- Occupations: Artist, writer
- Years active: 2013–present
- Employer(s): Self Employed (2018-present) Buzzfeed (2013-2018)

Adam Ellis (born October 1, 1986) is an American artist, and writer best known for his Twitter multimedia series titled "Dear David" from 2017 to 2018; in which he would post drawings, photos, and recordings of a supposed child ghost haunting his home. His Twitter stories would lead to the 2023 film with the same title.

== Career ==
Adam worked at Buzzfeed from September 2013 until 2018, where he created or co-wrote 290 articles. His viral ghost story, "My Apartment Is Being Haunted By The Ghost Of A Dead Child And I'm Not Sure What To Do", was turned into a full-length film by Lionsgate in 2023. The film, Dear David, was released to poor reviews. On a Twitter post in October 2024, Adam revealed that he received no compensation from the film release since he had been a Buzzfeed employee when he wrote the story, which was technically legal due to BuzzFeed's contracts.

In January 2018 Adam became a self-employed comic artist and illustrator, using Instagram and Twitter (now X) for most of his works. Since becoming a self-employed artist he has published five books.

== Published works ==
Adam mostly creates comics, publishing multiple books that he created and illustrated.

Title	Date of Publication	ISBN-13	Notes
Sudoku Puzzle Book Vol 1: 200 Puzzles	October 25, 2012	978-1-4792-7936-4	
Sudoku Puzzle Book Vol 2: 200 Puzzles	January 18, 2013	978-1-4819-5829-5	
Sudoku Puzzle Book Vol 3: 200 Puzzles	January 24, 2013	978-1-4820-5574-0	
Books of Adam: The Blunder Years	July 9, 2013	978-1-4555-1698-8	First published comics book
Sudoku Puzzle Book Vol 4: 200 Puzzles	June 27, 2014	978-1-5002-4412-5	
Tiny Hats on Cats: Because Every Cat Deserves to Feel Fancy	October 20, 2015	978-1-4555-5813-1	
Super Chill: A Year of Living Anxiously	October 23, 2018	978-1-4494-9155-0	
Fever Knights: Official Fake Strategy Guide	May 3, 2022	978-1-5248-6286-2	Created to look like a real RPG video game strategy guide
Fever Knights Role-Playing Game: Powered by ZWEIHANDER RPG	November 7, 2023	978-1-5248-6760-7	Role-Playing Game Co-authored with Daniel D. Fox, Anna Goldberg, Gabriel Hicks, Kate Bullock, and ARTeapot
Bad Dreams in the Night (Horror Stories by Adam Ellis)	April 15, 2024	978-1-5248-8718-6	
Let Me in Your Window (Horror Stories by Adam Ellis)	September 9, 2025	979-8-8816-0324-3	

== Lawsuits ==
Since January 2023, Ellis has been involved in an ongoing copyright infringement lawsuit against Stability AI, over its text-to-image model, Stable Diffusion, being allegedly trained on his comics.
