= List of The Try Guys episodes =

The Try Guys is an American online comedy series currently available for streaming on YouTube starring comedians and filmmakers Keith Habersberger, Ned Fulmer, Zach Kornfeld, and Eugene Lee Yang. The group created the Try Guys while working for BuzzFeed and subsequently separated themselves from the internet media company in 2018.

As of 2022, Ned Fulmer is no longer with the group after a scandal broke involving another company member, resulting in Fulmer resigning from the company. As of 2025, Ash Perez is a member.

== Series overview ==
The series is divided up into two distinct parts. The first part took place since their inception in 2014 until they left Buzzfeed in 2018. The second phase began in mid-2018 when the four guys began an independent company, 2nd Try LLC.

Season	Episodes	Originally released		
Season	Episodes	First released	Last released	Network
1	9	September 12, 2014	January 25, 2015	BuzzFeed Video
2	12	February 11, 2015	May 10, 2015	BuzzFeed Video
3	12	May 17, 2015	August 4, 2015	BuzzFeed Video
4	11	August 12, 2015	October 29, 2015	BuzzFeed Video
5	11	November 1, 2015	March 6, 2016	BuzzFeed Video
6	12	March 16, 2016	September 12, 2016	BuzzFeed Video
7	11	September 24, 2016	March 19, 2017	BuzzFeed Video
8	11	March 26, 2017	June 17, 2017	BuzzFeed Video
9	23	July 22, 2017	February 10, 2018	BuzzFeed Video
10	496	June 17, 2018	Present	2nd Try LLC

=== List of episodes ===
Overall					Spin-off shows		Source
No. in series	No. in season	Title	Length	Release date	Series name	No. in series	Source
Keith, Ned, Zach & Eugene (2014-2022)
Buzzfeed Video – Season 1
1	1	"Guys Try On Ladies' Underwear For The First Time // Try Guys"	2:38	September 12, 2014			
2	2	"Men Try On Ladies' Sexy Halloween Costumes // Try Guys"	3:19	October 22, 2014			
3	3	"Guys Recreate Kim Kardashian’s Butt Photo // Try Guys"	3:47	November 13, 2014			
4	4	"American Guys Try European Swimwear // Try Guys"	4:23	November 19, 2014			
5	5	"The Try Guys Try Drag For The First Time"	8:48	December 7, 2014			
6	6	"The Try Guys Try Nude Modeling"	5:25	December 7, 2014			
7	7	"The Try Guys Test The Legal Alcohol Limit"	5:25	December 30, 2014			
8	8	"The Try Guys Shoot Guns For The First Time"	5:12	January 18, 2015			
9	9	"The Try Guys Try 'Fifty Shades' Style BDSM"	6:50	January 25, 2015			
Buzzfeed Video – Season 2
10	1	"The Try Guys Try Valentine's Day Lingerie"	3:39	February 11, 2015			
11	2	"The Try Guys Taste Test Jerky"	3:19	February 23, 2015			
12	3	"UFC Fighters Answer Adorable Questions"	2:55	February 28, 2015			
13	4	"The Try Guys Try Magic Mike Stripping"	7:02	March 6, 2015			
14	5	"The Try Guys Try Makeup Tutorials"	2:44	March 11, 2015			
15	6	"The Try Guys' Naked Sushi Prank"	6:42	April 1, 2015			
16	7	"The Try Guys Try UFC Fighting"	10:29	April 10, 2015			
17	8	"The Try Guys Try Pregnancy Bellies • Motherhood: Part 1"	5:08	May 6, 2015	Motherhood	1	
18	9	"The Try Guys Change Dirty Diapers • Motherhood: Part 2"	3:05	May 7, 2015	Motherhood	2	
19	10	"The Try Guys Raise Robot Babies • Motherhood: Part 3"	7:19	May 8, 2015	Motherhood	3	
20	11	"The Try Guys Try Labor Pain Simulation • Motherhood: Part 4"	8:02	May 9, 2015	Motherhood	4	
21	12	"The Try Guys Thank Their Moms • Motherhood: Part 5"	6:08	May 10, 2015	Motherhood	5	
Buzzfeed Video – Season 3
22	1	"The Try Guys Try American Ninja Warrior"	3:56	May 17, 2015			
23	2	"The Try Guys Try Boob Contouring"	3:32	May 24, 2015			
24	3	"Which Harry Potter House Do You Belong In?"	0:51	May 26, 2015			
25	4	"The Try Guys Hit 90 MPH Fastballs"	5:44	May 31, 2015			
26	5	"The Try Guys Try Wedding Dresses"	3:46	June 20, 2015			
27	6	"The Try Guys March In The Pride Parade"	3:29	June 26, 2015			
28	7	"The Try Guys Try Not To Die Alone"	14:07	June 29, 2015			
29	8	"The Try Guys Try Irish Step Dance"	3:30	July 12, 2015			
30	9	"The Try Guys Watch Anime For The First Time"	8:24	August 1, 2015	Cosplay	1	
31	10	"The Try Guys Make Sailor Moon Costumes"	8:24	August 2, 2015	Cosplay	2	
32	11	"The Try Guys Cosplay For The First Time"	8:24	August 3, 2015	Cosplay	3	
33	12	"The Try Guys Try Cosplay Fashion"	6:44	August 4, 2015	Cosplay	4	
Buzzfeed Video – Season 4
34	1	"If Guys Said What Donald Trump Says // The Try Guys"	2:23	August 12, 2015			
35	2	"The Try Guys Try Extreme Swimsuits"	5:19	August 29, 2015			
36	3	"1ST ANNIVERSARY: The Try Guys Imitate Each Other"	3:43	September 12, 2015			
37	4	"The Try Guys Watch K-pop For The First Time • K-pop: Part 1"	7:14	September 23, 2015	K-Pop	1	
38	5	"The Try Guys Try K-pop Idol Makeup • K-pop: Part 2"	5:15	September 24, 2015	K-Pop	2	
39	6	"The Try Guys Try Korean Cooking • K-pop: Part 3"	6:49	September 25, 2015	K-Pop	3	
40	7	"The Try Guys Recreate Korean Drama Scenes • K-pop: Part 4"	6:12	September 26, 2015	K-Pop	4	
41	8	"The Try Guys Try K-pop Dance Moves • K-pop: Finale"	5:50	September 27, 2015	K-Pop	5	
42	9	"The Try Guys Try Coding With Girls Who Code"	4:48	October 3, 2015			
43	10	"The Try Guys Try Perverted Halloween Costumes"	5:10	October 17, 2015			
44	11	"The Try Guys Try Childhood-Ruining Costumes"	5:15	October 29, 2015			
Buzzfeed Video – Season 5
45	1	"The Try Guys Get Prostate Exams"	5:22	November 1, 2015			
46	2	"The Try Guys Recreate Iconic Boy Band Album Covers feat. Doug The Pug"	5:35	November 29, 2015			
47	3	"The Try Guys Try Therapy"	7:32	December 13, 2015			
48	4	"The Try Guys Become Santa • Santa Spectacular: Part 1"	5:08	December 18, 2015	Santa Spectacular	1	
49	5	"The Try Guys Break Into A House • Santa Spectacular: Part 2"	7:18	December 19, 2015	Santa Spectacular	2	
50	6	"Kids Surprised With Dream Toys • The Try Guys Santa Spectacular: Part 3"	4:34	December 20, 2015	Santa Spectacular	3	
51	7	"The Try Guys Try The MS Mud Run"	2:45	January 2, 2016			
52	8	"The Try Guys Try To Find The Best Pizza • NY Vs. LA"	6:40	January 16, 2016			
53	9	"Sexy Edible Lingerie Taste Test • Try Guys"	7:04	February 7, 2016			
54	10	"The Try Guys Play F***, Marry, Kill: Ned's Wife Edition"	6:36	February 28, 2016			
55	11	"The Try Guys Test Their Sperm Count"	6:27	March 6, 2016			
Buzzfeed Video – Season 6
56	1	"Which Type Of Alcohol F*cks You Up The Most?"	9:49	March 16, 2016			
57	2	"Extreme Asian Food Challenge • Try Guys Feast Mode"	7:29	March 27, 2016			
58	3	"The Try Guys Try Stepping"	5:48	April 10, 2016			
59	4	"The Try Guys Get Style Makeovers"	12:43	April 19, 2016			
60	5	"The Try Guys Get Photoshopped With Men's Ideal Body Types"	11:00	May 15, 2016			
61	6	"The Try Guys Ocean Survival Food Taste Test"	2:42	June 16, 2016	Ocean Survival	1	
62	7	"The Try Guys Try Not To Die At Sea"	5:17	June 17, 2016	Ocean Survival	2	
63	8	"The Try Guys Swim With Sharks"	4:14	June 18, 2016	Ocean Survival	3	
64	9	"The Try Guys Get Photoshopped Like Women"	10:18	July 12, 2016			
65	10	"The Try Guys Try The Ancient Olympics"	19:06	August 5, 2016			
66	11	"The Try Guys Danish Food Taste Test"	4:36	August 27, 2016			
67	12	"The Try Guys React To Their First Videos • 2-Year Anniversary"	9:29	September 12, 2016			
Buzzfeed Video – Season 7
68	1	"The Try Guys Go Bald"	10:20	September 24, 2016			
69	2	"The Try Guys Transform Into Monsters To Scare People"	9:42	October 20, 2016			
70	3	"The Try Guys Try Distracted Driving // Presented By Kia Forte"	9:38	November 4, 2016			
71	4	"The Try Guys Crash Cars Into Each Other // Presented by The Grand Tour"	12:58	December 12, 2016			
72	5	"The Try Guys Try The Weirdest Beauty Trends Of 2016"	5:17	December 17, 2016			
73	6	"Trump Grill Taste Test • The Try Guys"	7:25	January 27, 2017			
74	7	"The Try Guys Wear Boob Weights For A Day"	10:06	February 5, 2017			
75	8	"The Try Guys Prank Each Other // Presented By Warner Bros. Pictures Fist Fight"	12:20	February 15, 2017			
76	9	"The Try Guys Take A Friendship DNA Test"	12:29	March 5, 2017			
77	10	"The Try Guys Sexy Alcohol Taste Test"	7:05	March 12, 2017			
78	11	"The Four Types Of Friends You Have • Try Guys"	5:28	March 19, 2017			
Buzzfeed Video – Season 8
79	1	"The Try Guys Wear High Heels For A Night"	9:51	March 26, 2017			
80	2	"The Try Guys Drunk Fast Food Taste Test"	5:35	April 1, 2017			
81	3	"The Try Guys Play Rocket League"	8:39	April 8, 2017			
82	4	"The Try Guys Take A Lie Detector Test"	10:35	April 15, 2017			
83	5	"The Try Guys Give Each Other Facials"	7:58	May 6, 2017			
84	6	"The Try Guys Take An Ancestry DNA Test"	9:59	May 20, 2017			
85	7	"The Try Guys Re-Create Photos Of Their Dads • Fatherhood: Part 1"	12:27	June 13, 2017	Fatherhood	1	
86	8	"The Try Guys And Their Dads Imitate Each Other • Fatherhood: Part 2"	7:38	June 14, 2017	Fatherhood	2	
87	9	"The Try Guys Raise Toddlers For A Day • Fatherhood: Part 3"	18:27	June 15, 2017	Fatherhood	3	
88	10	"The Try Guys Shave Their Dads • Fatherhood: Part 4"	13:13	June 16, 2017	Fatherhood	4	
89	11	"Fathers React To Extreme Try Guys Videos • Fatherhood: Part 5"	7:50	June 17, 2017	Fatherhood	5	
Buzzfeed Video – Season 9
90	1	"The Try Guys Try Ballet"	14:57	July 22, 2017			
91	2	"The Try Guys Try The Japanese Tablecloth Trick • The Try Vlog"	7:04	July 29, 2017			
92	3	"The Try Guys Try Cuban Miami"	16:04	August 5, 2017			
93	4	"The Try Guys Contact Deceased Family Members Featuring The Hollywood Medium"	21:09	August 19, 2017			
94	5	"The Try Guys Throw A $300,000 Bachelor Partys"	19:01	September 2, 2017			
95	6	"I Have An Autoimmune Disease • The Try Vlog"	9:51	September 9, 2017			
96	7	"The Try Guys Get Makeovers From High School Girls"	15:23	September 16, 2017			
97	8	"Keith Eats Everything At McDonald's • The Try Vlog"	10:23	September 23, 2017	Eat The Menu	1	
98	9	"The Try Guys Sleep In A Fan's Haunted Bedroom • The Try Vlog (feat. BuzzFeed Unsolved)"	12:13	September 30, 2017			
99	10	"The Try Guys Try Immigrating To America"	16:18	October 7, 2017			
100	11	"The Try Guys Try Roller Derby"	21:17	October 14, 2017			
101	12	"Ned Tries Famous Soccer Trick Shots • The Try Vlog"	10:12	October 21, 2017			
102	13	"The Try Guys Test Who Is The Most Attractive"	21:27	October 28, 2017			
103	14	"The Try Guys Become Groomsmen For Keith's Wedding • The Try Vlog"	14:21	November 4, 2017			
104	15	"The Try Guys Bake Bread Without A Recipe"	18:32	November 11, 2017	Without A Recipe	1	
105	16	"The Try Guys Feed Wild Animals In Alaska • The Try Vlog"	8:58	November 18, 2017			
106	17	"The Try Guys Make Tinder Profiles"	7:48	November 25, 2017			
107	18	"The Try Guys Make The Ultimate Holiday Calendar"	19:06	December 2, 2017			
108	19	"Eugene Drinks Every State's Most Iconic Alcohol • The Try Vlog"	25:32	December 9, 2017			
109	20	"Male Sex Symbols Throughout History • The Try Guys"	12:46	December 16, 2017			
110	21	"The Try Guys Race Dune Buggies • Dirty Tour: Part 1"	13:46	January 27, 2018	Dirty Tour	1	
111	22	"The Try Guys Race Swamp Boats • Dirty Tour: Part 2"	15:09	February 3, 2018	Dirty Tour	2	
112	23	"The Try Guys Race Dog Sleds • Dirty Tour: Part 3"	14:37	February 10, 2018	Dirty Tour	3	
2nd Try LLC. – Season 10
–	–	"THE TRY GUYS – Channel Trailer"	4:26	June 16, 2018			
113	1	"The Try Guys Throw A Baby Shower – Parenthood Part 1"	14:37	June 17, 2018	Parenthood	1	
114	2	"The Try Guys Deliver A Baby"	14:52	June 20, 2018	Parenthood	2	
115	3	"The Try Guys Diet Like Pregnant Women For A Week"	16:33	June 23, 2018	Parenthood	3	
116	4	"75 Things That Will Restore Your Faith In The Internet – Try Guys Live!"	20:00	June 27, 2018			
117	5	"The Try Guys Try 14 Hours Of Labor Pain Simulation"	23:51	June 30, 2018	Parenthood	4	
118	6	"Keith Eats Everything At Taco Bell"	10:51	July 4, 2018	Eat The Menu	2	
119	7	"The Try Guys Meet Ned's Baby"	9:35	July 7, 2018	Parenthood	5	
120	8	"Keith Puppysits The Try Guys Dogs"	16:34	July 11, 2018	The Barkchshler	1	
121	9	"Should The Try Guys Get Plastic Surgery?"	20:41	July 14, 2018			
122	10	"Why We Started Our Own Company"	12:15	July 18, 2018			
123	11	"The Try Guys Crash Test A New Roller Coaster"	14:17	July 21, 2018			
124	12	"Keith Reviews 101 Puppies"	17:29	July 23, 2018	The Barkchshler	2	
125	13	"Which Store Makes The Best Custom Cake?"	14:10	July 25, 2018	Candid Competition	1	
126	14	"The Try Guys Wear Corsets For 72 Hours"	17:07	July 28, 2018			
127	15	"My First Week As A Father *emotional*"	10:53	August 1, 2018	Ned & Ariel	1	
128	16	"Cat Lovers Try Dog Grooming – The Try Guys"	13:04	August 4, 2018			
129	17	"Which Try Guy Knows Keith The Best?"	10:25	August 8, 2018	TGGT	1	
130	18	"The Try Guys Recreate Fan Fiction"	13:10	August 11, 2018			
131	19	"Which Try Guy Knows Ned The Best?"	11:25	August 15, 2018	TGGT	2	
132	20	"Eugene Ranks Cheap American Beer"	14:43	August 18, 2018	Rank King	1	
133	21	"Which Try Guy Knows Zach The Best?"	11:35	August 22, 2018	TGGT	3	
134	22	"Which Store Has The Best Back To School Shopping?"	14:31	August 25, 2018	Candid Competition	2	
135	23	"Which Try Guy Knows Eugene The Best?"	12:56	August 29, 2018	TGGT	4	
136	24	"The Try Guys Get Kidnapped"	18:14	September 1, 2018			
137	25	"The Try Guys Roast Each Other's Instagrams"	11:39	September 5, 2018	TGGT	5	
138	26	"Can McDonald's Become Fine Dining? – The Happy Meal"	13:53	September 8, 2018			
139	27	"The Try Guys 4-Year Anniversary Challenge"	13:53	September 12, 2018			
140	28	"i'm getting worse (autoimmune update)"	8:20	September 15, 2018			
141	29	"Keith Challenges 25 Dogs To Recreate The Bachelor"	12:24	September 19, 2018	The Barkchshler	3	
142	30	"The Try Guys Get Makeovers From Little Girls"	19:18	September 22, 2018			
143	31	"Keith Eats Everything At KFC"	18:26	September 26, 2018	Eat The Menu	3	
144	32	"The Try Guys Reveal Their Favorite YouTubers"	10:16	September 29, 2018	TGGT	6	
145	33	"The Try Guys Get Nail Extensions"	15:55	October 3, 2018			
146	34	"The Try Guys' Surprise Office Makeover"	14:26	October 6, 2018			
147	35	"The Try Guys Try Cringey Couples Halloween Costumes"	10:02	October 10, 2018			
148	36	"The Try Guys Try The World's Grossest Alcohols"	10:26	October 13, 2018			
149	37	"The Try Guys Test Drunk Driving"	21:00	October 17, 2018	DUI	1	
150	38	"The Try Guys Test High Driving"	16:55	October 20, 2018	DUI	2	
151	39	If Clickbait Was A Movie	3:29	October 23, 2018			
152	40	"The Try Guys Test Sleep-Deprived Driving"	16:08	October 24, 2018	DUI	3	
153	41	"The Try Guys Test Texting While Driving"	13:46	October 27, 2018	DUI	4	
154	42	"My Dad’s First Drag Show (Featuring Kim Chi)"	12:14	October 31, 2018			
155	43	"Lewberger – Facebook Break Official Music Video"	4:12	November 2, 2018			
156	44	"The Try Guys Recreate Celebrity Makeup Looks Drunk"	10:25	November 3, 2018			
157	45	"Keith's First Wedding Anniversary – The Try Vlog"	11:02	November 7, 2018			
158	46	"The Try Guys Reveal New Merch! (Fashion Show)"	6:19	November 10, 2018			
159	47	"Eugene Babysits Ned's Baby"	17:29	November 14, 2018			
160	48	"The Try Guys Wear Women's Pants (feat. Safiya Nygaard)"	15:48	November 17, 2018			
161	49	"The Try Guys Try Not To Laugh Challenge"	13:43	November 21, 2018	TGGT	7	
162	50	"Eugene Ranks The World's Most Popular Fruit"	25:58	November 24, 2018	Rank King	2	
163	51	"The Try Guys React To College Kids React To The Try Guys"	7:38	November 26, 2018			
164	52	"Home-Cooked Vs. $1000 Gingerbread House"	13:13	November 28, 2018	Ned & Ariel	2	
165	53	"The Try Guys Get Their Bones Cracked"	10:06	December 1, 2018			
166	54	"Eugene Volunteers At The Trevor Project"	12:29	December 3, 2018			
167	55	"The Try Guys Try Naughty Christmas Costumes"	10:37	December 5, 2018			
168	56	"Ned & Ariel's New House Tour"	21:38	December 8, 2018	Ned & Ariel	3	
169	57	"Keith Judges 11 Dogs And Their Hometowns"	16:50	December 10, 2018	The Barkchshler	4	
170	58	"My Secret Girlfriend"	7:03	December 12, 2018			
171	59	"The Try Guys Bake Pie Without A Recipe"	25:31	December 15, 2018	Without A Recipe	2	
172	60	"Eugene Gets Surprised With His Worst Nightmare"	17:23	December 17, 2018			
173	61	"The Try Wives React To Iconic Try Guys Videos"	11:26	December 19, 2018	TWWT	1	
174	62	"The Try Guys Try Knitting"	22:19	December 22, 2018			
175	63	"Keith Crowns Instagram's Next Dog Superstar"	18:37	December 24, 2018	The Barkchshler	5	
176	64	"Who Were We Before The Try Guys?"	15:06	December 26, 2018	TGGT	8	
177	65	"The Try Guys Rewind 2018"	18:04	December 29, 2018			
178	66	"The Try Guys Take A Mental Health Vacation"	17:56	January 16, 2019			
179	67	"The Try Guys Try Instagram Editing Apps"	10:52	January 19, 2019			
180	68	"Ned Reacts To The Try Guys Bone Cracking Video"	8:49	January 23, 2019			
181	69	"The Try Guys Compete In A Pro Gaming Tournament"	23:49	January 26, 2019			
182	70	"We Have A Secret"	10:30	January 30, 2019			
183	71	"The Try Wives Reveal The Try Guys’ Best-Kept Secrets"	10:06	February 2, 2019	TWWT	2	
184	72	"The Try Guys 400 Dumpling Mukbang ft. Strictly Dumpling"	17:26	February 6, 2019	Eat The Menu	4	
185	73	"The Try Guys Wear Crop Tops For A Day"	11:32	February 9, 2019			
186	74	"Yale Graduate Takes The SAT As An Adult"	11:18	February 13, 2019			
187	75	"The Try Guys Try 90s Crafts ft. LaurDIY"	12:45	February 16, 2019			
188	76	"I'm On Vacation, Bitch (Official Music Video)"	2:42	February 18, 2019			
189	77	"Which Chain Makes The Best Custom Pizza?"	18:40	February 20, 2019	Candid Competition	3	
190	78	"The Try Guys Switch Pets For A Day"	18:01	February 23, 2019			
191	79	"The Try Guys Ruin ASMR ft. ASMR Darling"	16:09	February 27, 2019			
192	80	"The Try Guys Try Karate"	15:20	March 2, 2019			
193	81	"Keith Eats Everything At Burger King"	19:35	March 4, 2019	Eat The Menu	5	
194	82	"I Got Knee Surgery"	13:00	March 6, 2019			
195	83	"Try Guys Roleplay 118 ASMR Triggers To Help You ~Relax~ (UNCUT)"	54:34	March 7, 2019			
196	84	"Eugene Ranks Every Girl Scout Cookie"	17:07	March 9, 2019	Rank King	3	
197	85	"Keith Eats Everything At Panda Express"	18:59	March 11, 2019	Eat The Menu	6	
198	86	"The Try Guys Try Acupuncture"	13:18	March 13, 2019			
199	87	"Life Before Kids Vs. After Kids"	4:44	March 16, 2019	Ned & Ariel	4	
200	88	"Keith Eats Everything At Olive Garden"	29:23	March 18, 2019	Eat The Menu	7	
201	89	"Eugene Performs In His First Local Drag Show"	13:44	March 20, 2019			
202	90	"Eugene Ranks Every Astrological Sign From Best To Worst"	23:21	March 23, 2019	Rank King	4	
203	91	"Keith Eats $1200 Of Steak"	22:47	March 25, 2019	Eat The Menu	8	
204	92	"The Try Guys Play Boink, Marry, Kill"	19:08	March 27, 2019	TGGT	9	
205	93	"The Try Guys Try Pottery"	22:24	March 30, 2019			
206	94	"The Try Guys Test Old Age Body Simulators"	13:21	April 3, 2019	Old Age	1	
207	95	"When Will The Try Guys Die?"	15:32	April 6, 2019	Old Age	2	
208	96	"The Try Guys Live Like 80-Year-Olds For A Day"	24:10	April 10, 2019	Old Age	3	
209	97	"The Try Guys Old Age Makeovers"	18:18	April 13, 2019	Old Age	4	
210	98	"The Try Guys Pimp Eugene's Ride – Part 1"	14:47	April 17, 2019			
211	99	"The Try Guys 2000 Autograph Challenge"	16:23	April 20, 2019			
212	100	"The Try Guys Surprise Eugene With His Nightmare Car"	14:41	April 24, 2019			
213	101	"The Try Guys Make Sushi Rolls"	18:57	April 27, 2019			
214	102	"The Try Guys Play Beer Pong With Gross Drinks"	15:30	May 1, 2019	TGGT	10	
215	103	"WE HAVE A HUGE ANNOUNCEMENT"	8:47	May 4, 2019			
216	104	"The Try Wives Make Custom Wine"	15:00	May 8, 2019	TWWT	3	
217	105	"The Try Guys Try 13 Future Technologies At Google"	13:03	May 11, 2019			
218	106	"What Are The Try Guys Doing On Tour?"	2:22	May 14, 2019			
219	107	"Eugene's Guide To Every Hair Product"	17:35	May 15, 2019			
220	108	"Zach Binges Every Dolan Twins Video For 24 Hours"	20:51	May 18, 2019			
221	109	"Keith Eats Everything In New Orleans"	11:38	May 22, 2019	Eat The Menu	9	
222	110	"The Try Guys Visit Eugene's Hometown"	26:50	May 25, 2019			
223	111	"The Try Guys Fix Their Voices"	13:33	May 29, 2019			
224	112	"The Try Wives Makeup Mystery Box Makeover Challenge"	14:43	June 1, 2019	TWWT	4	
225	113	"The Try Guys $850 Indian Food Challenge ft. Lilly Singh"	24:41	June 5, 2019			
226	114	"The Try Guys Get Earwax Extractions"	13:41	June 8, 2019			
227	115	"The Try Guys Bake Gourmet Cookies (ft. Gabbie Hanna)"	19:25	June 12, 2019			
228	116	"I'm Gay – Eugene Lee Yang"	5:08	June 15, 2019			
229	117	"Why I'm Coming Out As Gay"	27:33	June 17, 2019			
230	118	"Try Guys Drunk Vegan Fast Food Taste Test"	13:12	June 19, 2019			
231	119	"Ned Faces His Fashion Fears For A Week"	15:30	June 22, 2019			
232	120	"The Try Guys CRAZIEST WEEK EVER"	11:59	June 26, 2019			
233	121	"The Try Guys Try CrossFit"	10:35	June 29, 2019			
234	122	"Keith's 400 Chicken McNugget Challenge ft. The Food Babies"	16:02	July 3, 2019	The Food Babies	1	
235	123	"The Try Guys Give Pedicures To Each Other"	11:48	July 6, 2019			
236	124	"Microblading My Scalp For Balding"	12:25	July 10, 2019			
237	125	"I Got Surgery For My Balding"	18:59	July 13, 2019			
238	126	"Keith & Becky's $3,000 Junk Room Makeover * Try DIY"	16:34	July 17, 2019	Try DIY	1	
239	127	"Try Wives Redecorate Keith’s Room • TWWT"	10:13	July 20, 2019	TWWT	5	
240	128	"Zach's Surprise $2,500 Home Office Makeover * Try DIY"	16:07	July 24, 2019	Try DIY	2	
241	129	"Keith Eats Everything At Arby's"	26:49	July 27, 2019	Eat The Menu	10	
242	130	"Surprise $2,800 Studio Apartment Makeover * Try DIY"	15:15	July 31, 2019	Try DIY	3	
243	131	"Keith Eats Everything At Pizza Hut"	33:29	August 3, 2019	Eat The Menu	11	
244	132	"How A Puppy Changed My Life"	15:51	August 7, 2019			
245	133	"Keith Eats $500 Of Gourmet Cheese"	26:43	August 10, 2019	Eat The Menu	12	
246	134	"Which Store Makes The Best Custom Sandwich?"	20:54	August 14, 2019	Candid Competition	4	
247	135	"The Try Guys Play Giant Jenga Truth Or Dare"	17:42	August 17, 2019	TGGT	11	
248	136	"The Try Guys Lip Sync Battle Drag Queens"	28:24	August 19, 2019			
249	137	"Which Makeup Counter Gives The Best Custom Makeover?"	20:23	August 21, 2019	Candid Competition	5	
250	138	"Try Wives Tarot Read Our Love Futures"	17:37	August 24, 2019	TWWT	6	
251	139	"Who Throws The Best Free Birthday Party?"	19:57	August 28, 2019	Candid Competition	6	
252	140	"48 Amazing Gifts We Got On Tour"	12:05	August 31, 2019			
253	141	"Whose Fried Chicken Sandwich Is The Best?"	21:10	September 4, 2019			
254	142	"The Try Guys Try Drawing Male Models"	17:56	September 7, 2019			
255	143	"We Ate 20,000 Calories At Taco Bell"	20:59	September 11, 2019	The Food Babies	2	
256	144	"The Try Guys Draw Their Favorite YouTubers"	21:42	September 14, 2019	TGGT	12	
257	145	"The Try Guys EXTREME Tie-Dye Challenge"	15:23	September 18, 2019			
258	146	"The Try Guys Try Professional Bartending"	19:41	September 21, 2019			
259	147	"The Try Guys Spray Tan Each Other"	14:24	September 25, 2019			
260	148	"The Try Guys Play Truth Or Dare Roulette"	19:01	September 28, 2019	TGGT	13	
261	149	"Someone Is Trying To Kill Us..."	6:31	October 1, 2019			
262	150	"Eugene Ranks Every Disney Princess"	24:47	October 2, 2019	Rank King	5	
263	151	"The Try Guys Ultimate Japanese Candy Taste Test"	17:53	October 5, 2019			
264	152	"Eugene Ranks The Most Popular Cereals"	34:20	October 9, 2019	Rank King	6	
265	153	"Keith Eats Everything At Wendy's"	39:25	October 12, 2019	Eat The Menu	13	
266	154	"Who Is The Most Iconic Diva Of All Time?"	31:34	October 16, 2019	Rank King	7	
267	155	"Try Guys Try Sexy Vs Traditional Halloween Costumes"	13:39	October 19, 2019			
268	156	"Eugene Ranks Popular Cocktails Around The World"	28:40	October 23, 2019	Rank King	8	
269	157	"The Try Guys Plant 20 Million Trees (PSA Music Video)"	5:48	October 25, 2019			
270	158	"Can 4 Guys Beat A Blindfolded Chess Master? • The Try Guys: 4 Vs. 1"	18:49	October 28, 2019	4 Vs. 1	1	
271	159	"Carving Each Other's Faces On To Pumpkins 🎃"	21:39	October 30, 2019			
272	160	"The Try Guys Become Zookeepers For A Day • Try Australia"	18:35	November 2, 2019	Try Australia	1	
273	161	"The Try Guys Eat $1,200 Of Gourmet Seafood • Try Australia"	21:00	November 6, 2019	Try Australia	2	
274	162	"The Try Guys Coffee Art Competition • Try Australia"	23:00	November 9, 2019	Try Australia	3	
275	163	"We Made Meat Pies & Ate Gourmet Australian BBQ • Try Australia"	23:55	November 13, 2019	Try Australia	4	
276	164	"Keith Eats Everything At McDonald's Australia"	29:20	November 16, 2019	Eat The Menu	14	
277	165	"The Try Guys Try Rugby League • Try Australia"	15:34	November 20, 2019	Try Australia	5	
278	166	"The Try Guys Try Baby Photography"	11:26	November 23, 2019			
279	167	"The Try Guys Play With Dolls"	22:20	November 27, 2019			
280	168	"Keith Makes A Hot Sauce For Chicken"	18:28	November 30, 2019			
281	169	"How We Left BuzzFeed, from 4 Different Perspectives"	12:54	December 2, 2019			
282	170	"The Try Guys Try To Survive A Major Earthquake"	16:51	December 4, 2019			
283	171	"The Try Guys Bake Cookies Without A Recipe"	30:49	December 7, 2019	Without A Recipe	3	
284	172	"The Try Guys Rewind 2019, from 4 Different Perspectives"	11:41	December 9, 2019			
285	173	"Last To Leave Handcuffs Wins $10,000 ft. MrBeast"	16:00	December 11, 2019			
286	174	"The Try Guys Cook Bagels Without A Recipe"	33:04	December 14, 2019	Without A Recipe	4	
287	175	"Eugene Interviews the CEO of YouTube"	46:15	December 16, 2019			
288	176	"Keith Eats Every Pie"	26:10	December 18, 2019	Eat The Menu	15	
289	177	"The Try Guys Make Ice Cream Without A Recipe"	31:37	December 21, 2019	Without A Recipe	5	
290	178	"Eugene Babysits Twins For A Day"	16:49	December 23, 2019			
291	179	"Keith Transforms Into Eugene's Worst Nightmare (A Chair)"	26:17	December 25, 2019			
292	180	"The Try Guys Bake Cakes Without A Recipe"	35:40	December 28, 2019	Without A Recipe	6	
293	181	"The Try Guys Eat EVERY Singapore Street Food"	14:05	December 30, 2019			
294	182	"The 19 Best Songs Made Up By The Try Guys"	10:40	January 1, 2020			
295	183	"The Try Guys NEVER BEFORE SEEN Footage!"	25:50	January 4, 2020			
296	184	"The Try Guys Try Not To Get Scared Challenge"	12:42	January 8, 2020			
297	185	"The Try Guys Make Waffle Cones Without A Recipe"	23:03	January 11, 2020	Without A Recipe	7	
298	186	"The Try Guys Watch Animal Births For The First Time"	12:14	January 15, 2020			
299	187	"The Try Guys Try Dungeons And Dragons"	19:32	January 18, 2020			
300	188	"Keith Eats Everything At Shake Shack"	30:13	January 22, 2020	Eat The Menu	16	
301	189	"Try Guys 300 Sushi pc. Mukbang ft. The Food Babies"	22:11	January 25, 2020	The Food Babies	3	
302	190	"Which Try Guy Is The Best Boss?"	15:01	January 29, 2020			
303	191	"10,000 Squats In 24 Hours Challenge ft. Blogilates"	20:39	February 1, 2020			
304	192	"The Try Guys Try Debate Club"	20:26	February 5, 2020	TGGT	14	
305	193	"The Try Guys Build Ikea Furniture Without Instructions"	20:30	February 8, 2020	Without Instructions	1	
306	194	"The Try Guys Make Surprise DIY Valentines"	20:13	February 12, 2020			
307	195	"The Try Guys Take Lie Detector Tests (Again)"	16:34	February 15, 2020			
308	196	"Keith Eats Everything At Whataburger"	29:21	February 19, 2020	Eat The Menu	17	
309	197	"Can 4 Guys Beat A Poker Champion? • The Try Guys: 4 Vs. 1"	23:23	February 22, 2020	4 Vs. 1	2	
310	198	"The Try Guys Become TikTokers For A Week ft. Noen Eubanks"	34:44	February 26, 2020			
311	199	"The Try Guys Recreate Awkward Middle School Photos"	15:16	February 29, 2020			
312	200	"The Try Guys Read Mean & Thirsty YouTube Comments"	18:58	March 2, 2020			
313	201	"Eugene Ranks Every Popular Soda"	32:05	March 4, 2020	Rank King	9	
314	202	"The Try Guys Transform Into Beauty YouTubers"	25:11	March 7, 2020	Beauty Month	1	
315	203	"The Try Guys EXTREME Spicy Noodle Challenge"	20:03	March 9, 2020			
316	204	"The Try Guys Siblings Lie Detector Test"	20:36	March 11, 2020			
317	205	"The Try Guys Get $775 Red Carpet Facials"	16:12	March 14, 2020	Beauty Month	2	
318	206	"The Try Guys Coronavirus Channel Update"	18:17	March 16, 2020	#StayHome	1	
319	207	"The Try Guys Play Boink, Marry, Kill With Eugene's Mom"	25:31	March 18, 2020			
320	208	"The Try Guys Try Extreme Korean Skincare Products"	20:09	March 21, 2020	Beauty Month	3	
321	209	"The Try Guys Work From Home For 168 Hours"	25:44	March 23, 2020	#StayHome	2	
322	210	"The Try Guys Learn Tai Chi"	14:57	March 25, 2020			
323	211	"The Try Guys Shave Each Other's Faces"	20:00	March 28, 2020	Beauty Month	4	
324	212	"The Try Guys Quarantine Update Day 14"	15:32	March 30, 2020	#StayHome	3	
325	213	"The Try Guys Mystery Box Home-Cooking Challenge"	31:02	April 1, 2020	Mystery Dish	1	
326	214	"Oops, My Penis Was On The Internet"	18:18	April 4, 2020			
327	215	"The Try Guys Get New Hobbies At Home • Quarantine Vlog Day 21"	24:23	April 6, 2020	#StayHome	4	
328	216	"I’m At Risk for Covid-19"	12:25	April 8, 2020	#StayHome	5	
329	217	"Keith Reviews Every Trending Video On YouTube"	25:58	April 10, 2020	#StayHome	6	
330	218	"The Try Guys Drunk Vs. High Easter Egg Hunt"	14:51	April 11, 2020			
331	219	"The Try Guys Build A Mini Golf Course At Home"	25:38	April 13, 2020	#StayHome	7	
332	220	"The Try Guys Recreate Their Wives' Makeup Looks"	21:22	April 15, 2020	#StayHome	8	
333	221	"The Try Guys Try Crocheting"	25:24	April 18, 2020			
334	222	"The Try Guys Korean FIRE Noodle Challenge"	21:35	April 20, 2020	#StayHome	9	
335	223	"The Try Guys Replace Each Other"	19:57	April 22, 2020	#StayHome	10	
336	224	"Keith Eats Everything At Nando's PERi-PERi Chicken"	30:21	April 25, 2020	Eat The Menu	18	
337	225	"Ned Bakes Sourdough Bread For 14 Days"	16:57	April 27, 2020	#StayHome	11	
338	226	"The Try Guys Try Boxing"	26:38	April 29, 2020			
339	227	"Eugene Vs. Ned // Keith Vs. Zach FULL FIGHT"	27:38	April 30, 2020			
340	228	"The Try Guys Recreate Met Gala Fashion"	24:55	May 2, 2020	#StayHome	12	
341	229	"Eugene Ranks Every Spice In His Kitchen Cabinet"	32:21	May 4, 2020	Rank King	10	
342	230	"The Try Guys Try Fitness YouTuber Workouts"	22:55	May 6, 2020	#StayHome	13	
343	231	"The Try Guys Photoshop Prank Battle"	29:43	May 9, 2020	#StayHome	14	
344	232	"The Try Guys Try FIRE Cupping"	15:01	May 11, 2020			
345	233	"Why I'm Starting A New Company for $500 (and need your help) • Zach's Tea ep1"	13:46	May 13, 2020	Tea Time	1	
346	234	"Home-Cooked Vs. $55 Fancy Burger Meal"	27:02	May 16, 2020	Date Night	1	
347	235	"Keith Eats Everything At Popeye's & Raising Cane's"	31:25	May 18, 2020	Eat The Menu	19	
348	236	"Keith Gives The Try Guys A Sims Spa Day"	12:59	May 20, 2020	#StayHome	15	
349	237	"Our Girlfriends & Wives CUT Our Hair"	14:09	May 23, 2020	#StayHome	16	
350	238	"The Try Guys EXTREME Caffeine Taste Test • Zach's Tea ep2"	16:05	May 25, 2020	Tea Time	2	
351	239	"The Try Partners Mystery Box Cooking Challenge"	16:44	May 27, 2020	Mystery Dish	2	
352	240	"I Got A Six Pack In Six Weeks"	17:11	May 30, 2020	#StayHome	17	
353	241	"Keith’s 100 SPICY Wing Challenge ft. The Food Babies"	18:45	June 1, 2020	The Food Babies	4	
354	242	"The Try Guys Try Sexy Future Job Costumes"	10:44	June 6, 2020			
355	243	"The Try Guys High Bob Ross Paint Challenge"	14:50	June 8, 2020	#StayHome	18	
356	244	"Try Guys Try The Ghost Pepper Challenge"	13:19	June 10, 2020			
357	245	"The Try Guys Find Out Their REAL Harry Potter Houses"	25:48	June 13, 2020	TGGT	15	
358	246	"The Try Guys Photoshop Pranks Pt. 2 Worst Nightmares"	22:26	June 15, 2020	#StayHome	19	
359	247	"New Logo Reveal! • The Tea"	15:35	June 17, 2020	Tea Time	3	
360	248	"The Try Guys Surprise Ned With Mystery Gifts For Daddy"	16:21	June 20, 2020	#StayHome	20	
361	249	"Keith Eats & Drinks Everything At Dunkin Donuts"	46:21	June 22, 2020	Eat The Menu	20	
362	250	"The Try Guys Ultimate Spicy Snacks Taste Test"	16:09	June 24, 2020	#StayHome	21	
363	251	"Eugene Answers 36 Extremely Personal Questions"	17:04	June 27, 2020	#StayHome	22	
364	252	"The Try Guys Find Their Harry Potter Patronus"	15:54	June 29, 2020	TGGT	16	
365	253	"The Try Guys Drunk Vs. High Math Test"	20:41	July 1, 2020			
366	254	"The Try Wives Take Over The Company For A Day"	14:03	July 6, 2020			
367	255	"Surprising Our Partners With A Spa Day At Home"	20:43	July 8, 2020	#StayHome	23	
368	256	"The Try Guys Make Star Wars Legos Without Instructions"	33:26	July 11, 2020	Without Instructions	2	
369	257	"The Try Guys RETRY Baking Pies Without A Recipe"	26:35	July 15, 2020	Retry	1	
370	258	"The Try Wives ULTIMATE Trader Joe's Taste Test"	23:51	July 18, 2020			
371	259	"Keith Eats Everything At Gus' Fried Chicken"	22:00	July 22, 2020	Eat The Menu	21	
372	260	"Try Guys Pancake Art Challenge ft. Collins Key"	22:20	July 25, 2020	#StayHome	24	
373	261	"The Try Guys Tiny Face Makeup Challenge"	22:20	July 29, 2020	#StayHome	25	
374	262	"The Try Guys Recreate Dramatic Twilight Scenes"	19:05	August 1, 2020	TGGT	17	
375	263	"Try Guys $10,000 Death Nut Challenge"	24:09	August 5, 2020			
376	264	"We Tried Making Rainbow Sushi Donuts"	24:23	August 8, 2020	Date Night	2	
377	265	"I Spent $750 Advertising On Instagram & oops (ft. Danny Gonzalez) – The Tea"	16:32	August 10, 2020	Tea Time	4	
378	266	"Try Guys Try EXTREME Women's Swimsuits"	15:09	August 12, 2020			
379	267	"The Try Guys Vs. World's Smelliest Foods!"	14:41	August 15, 2020			
380	268	"Zach Makes The Perfect Cup of Tea • The Launch!"	14:40	August 17, 2020	Tea Time	5	
381	269	"Try Guys Roast Each Other's TikToks (before they're gone)"	31:36	August 19, 2020	TGGT	18	
382	270	"Try Guys Try Not To Laugh Challenge Pt. 2"	14:23	August 22, 2020	TGGT	19	
383	271	"Zach Surprises Fans With $1000 • Zach's Tea"	16:22	August 24, 2020	Tea Time	6	
384	272	"The Try Guys $3 Food Truck Challenge"	22:02	August 26, 2020			
385	273	"Last Sandcastle Standing Wins $10,000 ● Try Guys & Friends"	13:48	August 29, 2020			
386	274	"The Try Guys Wear Women's Leggings For A Day"	15:49	September 2, 2020			
387	275	"The Try Guys Shave Their Legs For The First Time"	14:32	September 5, 2020			
388	276	"The Try Guys Recreate Awkward Elementary School Photos"	18:17	September 9, 2020			
389	277	"Keith Eats Every Kind Of BBQ!"	23:59	September 12, 2020	Eat The Menu	22	
390	278	"Keith Eats Everything At Sonic"	28:56	September 16, 2020	Eat The Menu	23	
391	279	"The Try Guys Try To Make Pants Without Instructions"	31:27	September 19, 2020	Without Instructions	3	
392	280	"The Try Guys RETRY Baking Cookies Without A Recipe"	20:40	July 23, 2020	Retry	2	
393	281	"Try Guys Watch BTS Music Videos For The First Time"	18:17	September 26, 2020			
394	282	"The Try Guys Try Korean Snacks For The First Time"	20:11	September 30, 2020			
395	283	"Eugene Becomes A K-Pop Dancer ft. Jessi"	10:54	October 3, 2020			
396	284	"Guys Try Sexy Video Game Halloween Costumes"	14:24	October 7, 2020			
397	285	"Try Guys 5 lb. Spicy Seafood Mukbang ft. The Food Babies"	16:13	October 10, 2020	The Food Babies	5	
398	286	"The Try Guys Register 1000 Voters In 24 Hours"	20:25	October 13, 2020			
399	287	"The Try Guys Endorse Joe Biden For President"	9:41	October 17, 2020			
400	288	"Keith Eats Everything At Jack In The Box"	40:41	October 21, 2020	Eat The Menu	24	
401	289	"Can 4 Guys Beat A Puzzle Master?!"	14:02	October 24, 2020	4 Vs. 1	3	
402	290	"Keith Finds The Best Breakfast Burrito – Tailgate Debate"	13:50	October 28, 2020	Tailgate Debate	1	
403	291	"Try Guys & Friends Plays Among Us"	15:14	October 31, 2020			
404	292	"The Try Guys Make Dresses Without Instructions"	31:52	November 4, 2020	Without Instructions	4	
405	293	"Can 4 Guys Beat A Professional Bowler?"	19:49	November 7, 2020	4 Vs. 1	4	
406	294	"Try Guys Try On Women's Thongs"	14:59	November 11, 2020			
407	295	"Keith Finds The Best Burger EVER"	16:02	November 14, 2020	Tailgate Debate	2	
408	296	"How I Fixed My Balding (One Year After Surgery)"	12:39	November 18, 2020			
409	297	"Keith Eats Every Kind Of Dumpling"	22:25	November 21, 2020	Eat The Menu	25	
410	298	"The Try Guys Make Plushies Without Instructions"	31:50	November 25, 2020	Without Instructions	5	
411	299	"Home-Cooked Vs. Chef's Japanese Jiggly Souffle Pancake"	33:17	November 28, 2020	Date Night	3	
412	300	"OFFICIAL TRAILER – Behind The Try, A Try Guys Documentary"	2:45	November 30, 2020			
413	301	"Try Guys Surprise Billboard Reveal (We Made A Movie!)"	10:12	December 2, 2020			
414	302	"The Try Guys Cook Dumplings Without A Recipe"	50:36	December 5, 2020	Without A Recipe	8	
415	303	"The Try Guys 2,000 Autographed DVD Challenge"	22:37	December 7, 2020			
416	304	"Can 4 Guys Beat A Professional Golf Champion?"	19:49	December 9, 2020	4 Vs. 1	5	
417	305	"The Try Guys Bake Brownies Without A Recipe"	40:42	December 12, 2020	Without A Recipe	9	
418	306	"Keith & Eugene EXPOSE Toxic Masculinity With Relationship Advice"	17:13	December 14, 2020			
419	307	"The Try Guys Try Archery"	20:46	December 16, 2020			
420	308	"The Try Guys Bake Pizza Without A Recipe"	39:39	December 19, 2020	Without A Recipe	10	
421	309	"Can 4 Average People Beat A Pro Crossword Puzzler?"	20:29	December 21, 2020	4 Vs. 1	6	
422	310	"Keith Eats & Drinks Everything At Starbucks"	45:13	December 23, 2020	Eat The Menu	26	
423	311	"The Try Guys Bake Cheesecake Without A Recipe"	39:22	December 26, 2020	Without A Recipe	11	
424	312	"Try Guys & Friends Try Tennis"	18:09	December 28, 2020			
425	313	"Try Guys Try Hang Gliding For The First Time"	18:09	December 30, 2020			
426	314	"Keith Reviews Everything From 2020"	13:53	January 2, 2021			
427	315	"Try Guys Debunk COVID Vaccine Conspiracies With Dr. Fauci"	14:16	January 9, 2021			
428	316	"Eugene Ranks The Cheapest Wines"	28:33	January 16, 2021	Rank King	11	
429	317	"EXTREME Carolina Reaper Chicken Challenge"	17:02	January 23, 2021	The Food Babies	6	
430	318	"Keith Eats Everything At Jollibee"	30:03	January 30, 2021	Eat The Menu	27	
431	319	"The Try Guys Wear 1800s Bridgerton Dresses"	14:26	February 3, 2021			
432	320	"Eugene Babysits Keith's Cat For A Day"	17:42	February 6, 2021			
433	321	"Keith Finds The Best Pizza"	17:02	February 10, 2021	Tailgate Debate	3	
434	322	"The Try Guys Draw Nude Self Portraits"	21:32	February 13, 2021			
435	323	"Try Guys Try Drunk Vs. High Trivia"	27:02	February 17, 2021			
436	324	"Try Guys Photoshop Prank Battle Pt. 3 Wildest Dreams"	29:00	February 20, 2021			
437	325	"Keith Eats Everything At In-N-Out *SECRET MENU*"	33:19	February 24, 2021	Eat The Menu	28	
438	326	"Try Guys Try Being Left-Handed For A Day"	21:23	February 27, 2021			
439	327	"Eugene Ranks The Most Popular Reality TV Shows"	30:39	March 3, 2021	Rank King	12	
440	328	"Try Guys Extreme Ice Bath Challenge"	11:04	March 6, 2021			
441	329	"Korean Corn Dogs Challenge • The Food Babies"	20:17	March 10, 2021	The Food Babies	7	
442	330	"The Try Guys Try DIY Soap Art ft. Royalty Soaps"	22:23	March 13, 2021			
443	331	"Try Guys RETRY Cooking Bagels Without A Recipe"	14:20	March 17, 2021	Retry	3	
444	332	"Try Guys Test Popular TikTok Hacks"	15:03	March 20, 2021			
445	333	"We Need To Talk About Anti-Asian Hate"	1:10:08	March 24, 2021			
446	334	"Keith Eats Everything At Subway"	38:51	March 27, 2021	Eat The Menu	29	
447	335	"Try Guys Test Craziest 5-Minute Crafts"	18:15	March 31, 2021			
448	336	"Try Guys Try Pickling Gross Food Combos"	31:12	April 3, 2021			
449	337	"Reacting To Your Meanest Comments (Part 2)"	20:40	April 7, 2021			
450	338	"Try Guys Swap Mystery Cooking Boxes"	30:30	April 10, 2021			
451	339	"Husband Vs. Best Friend Recreate Iconic Drag Makeup"	22:32	April 14, 2021			
452	340	"Try Guys Test The Craziest Food Hacks On TikTok"	23:10	April 17, 2021			
453	341	"Keith Finds The Best Barbecue • Tailgate Debate"	18:50	April 21, 2021	Tailgate Debate	4	
454	342	"Ned & Ariel Write A Cookbook"	16:42	April 24, 2021			
455	343	"The Try Guys Try Drag For The First Time (Re-tucked)"	42:03	April 28, 2021			
456	344	"Try Guys Bake Pavlova WITH A Recipe"	35:55	May 1, 2021			
457	345	"Keith Pranks His Mother-In-Law"	10:15	May 5, 2021			
458	346	"Chicken Fajita Cook-Off: Mom Vs. Spouse"	19:51	May 8, 2021			
459	347	"Surprising ZHC With $4200 Custom iPhone 12s"	18:08	May 12, 2021			
460	348	"Keith Eats Everything At Chipotle"	41:52	May 15, 2021	Eat The Menu	30	
461	349	"Home-Cooked Vs. $15 Vegan Fried Chicken"	30:28	May 19, 2021	Date Night	4	
462	350	"Trying Amazon 5-Star Products For Chronic Pain"	22:06	May 22, 2021			
463	351	"Try Guys Transform Into Iconic Toys"	13:02	May 26, 2021			
464	352	"Try Guys Take A 5th Grade Fitness Test"	23:27	May 29, 2021			
465	353	"We Spent 24 Hrs. Locked In Our Office (No Internet)"	18:04	June 2, 2021			
466	354	"Why Are Pokémon Cards So Expensive?!"	25:53	June 5, 2021			
467	355	"Try Team Gets Their Bones Cracked"	11:51	June 9, 2021			
468	356	"Keith Eats Everything At A Theme Park"	37:17	June 12, 2021	Eat The Menu	31	
469	357	"Trying Cryotherapy (-220 Degrees) For Chronic Pain"	18:18	June 16, 2021			
470	358	"Try Guys Make $1,000 Flower Bouquets (ft. Kat McNamara)"	19:09	June 19, 2021			
471	359	"Try Guys Try Avant Garde Makeup Transformation (ft. Kalen Allen)"	21:40	June 23, 2021			
472	360	"The Fry Guys EXTREME Deep Frying Challenge"	14:56	June 26, 2021			
473	361	"Keith Learns Trombone In 30 Days"	18:17	June 30, 2021			
474	362	"Eating $2000 Of Gourmet Seafood • The Food Babies"	22:37	July 3, 2021	The Food Babies	8	
475	363	"Try Guys EXTREME Pokémon GO Fest Challenge"	3:37	July 7, 2021			
476	364	"Try Guys Bake Muffins Without A Recipe"	36:15	July 10, 2021	Without A Recipe	12	
477	365	"100 Years Of Gay Icons • Eugene Lee Yang (Live Performance)"	15:00	July 14, 2021			
478	366	"The Try Guys Bake Macarons Without A Recipe"	51:36	July 17, 2021	Without A Recipe	13	
479	367	"We Tried Hugging Cows For Stress Relief"	13:27	July 21, 2021			
480	368	"The Try Guys Make Donuts Without A Recipe"	45:09	July 24, 2021	Without A Recipe	14	
481	369	"The Try Guys Mystery Wheel Cooking Challenge"	17:43	July 28, 2021	Mystery Dish	3	
482	370	"The Try Guys Make Ice Cream Cake Without A Recipe"	56:41	July 31, 2021	Without A Recipe	15	
483	371	"Pranking Our Staff With Extreme Bugs"	14:35	August 4, 2021			
484	372	"Guys Try Pole Dancing For The First Time"	22:51	August 7, 2021			
485	373	"Try Guys Parallel Park Semi-Trucks • BIG TRY"	18:58	August 11, 2021			
486	374	"Try Guys Get Pregnant In Sims 4 (ft. Kelsey Dangerous)"	24:34	August 14, 2021			
487	375	"Trying Virtual Reality For Chronic Pain and Anxiety"	11:57	August 18, 2021			
488	376	"Keith Eats Everything At Outback Steakhouse"	1:00:02	August 21, 2021	Eat The Menu	32	
489	377	"Try Guys Volunteer With Rescue Dogs"	19:18	August 25, 2021			
490	378	"The Try Partners Get Their Bones Cracked"	11:35	August 28, 2021			
491	379	"Candy Cook-Off: Keith Vs. Matt"	18:07	September 1, 2021	Family Recipe Battle	1	
492	380	"Can 4 Guys Beat A Professional Pool Player?"	22:34	September 4, 2021	4 Vs. 1	7	
493	381	"The Try Guys Cut Off Their Employee's Hair"	17:50	September 8, 2021			
494	382	"Can 4 Guys Beat A Soccer Olympian?"	15:37	September 11, 2021	4 Vs. 1	8	
495	383	"Try Guys Ultimate Japanese Street Food Taste Test (ft. The Food Babies)"	24:22	September 15, 2021			
496	384	"Can 4 Amateurs Beat A Pro Darts Player?"	18:00	September 18, 2021	4 Vs. 1	9	
497	385	"Try Guys $1,000,000 Office Competition In Sims 4"	22:32	September 22, 2021			
498	386	"My First Met Gala (And How I Almost Didn't Make It)"	39:57	September 25, 2021			
499	387	"Creamy Soup Cook-Off: Keith Vs. Becky’s Mom"	16:33	September 27, 2021	Family Recipe Battle	2	
500	388	"Try Guys Extreme Coffee Trivia Challenge"	28:27	September 29, 2021	TGGT	20	
501	389	"Try Guys Get Gen Z Makeovers"	19:05	October 2, 2021			
502	390	"Can 4 Guys Beat A Competitive Hot Dog Eater? (ft. Matt Stonie)"	25:15	October 6, 2021	4 Vs. 1	10	
503	391	"Moms Post Thirst Traps For A Week"	18:33	October 9, 2021			
504	392	"Which Chain Has The Best Chicken Wings?"	23:33	October 13, 2021			
505	393	"We Learn How To Do Professional Facials (ft. Hyram)"	15:03	October 16, 2021			
506	394	"Try Guys Ultimate Filipino Food Taste Test"	18:50	October 20, 2021			
507	395	"What’s The Best Place To Propose? CANDID COMPETITION"	34:00	October 23, 2021	Candid Competition	7	
508	396	"Who Makes The Best Wedding Cake? • Candid Competition"	20:09	October 27, 2021	Candid Competition	8	
509	397	"Where’s The Best Honeymoon Suite? • Candid Competition"	27:44	October 30, 2021	Candid Competition	9	
510	398	"Keith Eats Every Wendy's Breakfast Item • Complete The Menu"	16:23	November 3, 2021	Eat The Menu	33	
511	399	"The Try Wives Build Chairs Without Instructions"	19:04	November 6, 2021	Without Instructions	6	
512	400	"Try Guys Mystery Dish Challenge • Cooking Telephone"	23:26	November 10, 2021	Mystery Dish	4	
513	401	"Which Chain has The Best Crunchy Taco?"	24:22	November 13, 2021			
514	402	"Try Guys Extreme Exercise Trivia"	20:01	November 17, 2021	TGGT	21	
515	403	"Try Guys Play $3,800 Squid Game IRL • Red Light Green Light"	10:21	November 20, 2021			
516	404	"Try Guys Make Toys Without Instructions"	27:12	November 24, 2021	Without Instructions	7	
517	405	"Try Guys Bake Cinnamon Rolls Without A Recipe"	47:56	November 27, 2021	Without A Recipe	16	
518	406	"Try Guys Ultimate Thai Food Taste Test"	20:52	December 1, 2021			
519	407	"Try Guys Bake Mac & Cheese Without A Recipe"	49:29	December 4, 2021	Without A Recipe	17	
520	408	"Try Guys Extreme Drunk Trivia"	27:17	December 6, 2021	TGGT	22	
521	409	"Keith Eats Everything At A Vegan Restaurant"	30:01	December 8, 2021	Eat The Menu	34	
522	410	"Try Guys Make Sausage Without A Recipe"	48:27	December 11, 2021	Without A Recipe	18	
523	411	"Try Guys Extreme Fast Food Trivia (ft. The Food Babies)"	32:45	December 13, 2021	TGGT	23	
524	412	"Moms Recreate Iconic Magazine Covers"	36:12	December 15, 2021			
525	413	"Try Guys Bake Gingerbread Houses Without A Recipe"	52:13	December 18, 2021	Without A Recipe	19	
526	414	"Try Guys Extreme Puppy Trivia"	26:49	December 20, 2021	TGGT	24	
527	415	"Try Guys Mystery Wheel Cooking Challenge: Partner Swap"	20:05	November 22, 2021	Mystery Dish	5	
528	416	"Try Guys Giant Spaghetti Pool (1,000 LBS) ft. Mark Rober"	18:24	December 25, 2021			
529	417	"Try Guys Strip Trivia (-130 degrees)"	24:43	December 27, 2021	TGGT	25	
530	418	"Try Guys Try Tattoos"	23:28	December 29, 2021			
531	419	"Keith Eats Everything At Chili's"	1:04:46	January 1, 2022	Eat The Menu	35	
532	420	"Try Guys Extreme Sex Trivia"	22:36	January 8, 2022	TGGT	26	
533	421	"Try Guys Try Tap Dance"	23:28	January 15, 2022			
534	422	"Try Guys Extremely Stoned Trivia"	25:27	January 22, 2022	TGGT	27	
535	423	"Keith & Eugene Rank McDonald's Most Popular Foods"	34:05	January 29, 2022	Rank The Menu	1	
536	424	"Try Guys Drunk Vs. High Spelling Bee"	25:37	February 2, 2022	TGGT	28	
537	425	"Women Wear Wedding Dresses For The First Time"	26:53	February 5, 2022			
538	426	"Home-Cooked Vs. $300 Mac & Cheese"	22:49	February 9, 2022	Date Night	5	
539	427	"Try Guys Blow Sh*t Up"	17:54	February 12, 2022			
540	428	"Eugene Gets Surprised By A Zebra 🦓"	10:31	February 16, 2022	Zoogene	1	
541	429	"Try Guys Try Bridesmaids Dresses"	36:13	February 19, 2022			
542	430	"Try Guys Test The Craziest Recipes On TikTok"	19:41	February 23, 2022			
543	431	"Keith Eats Everything At Carl's Jr."	46:59	February 26, 2022	Eat The Menu	36	
544	432	"Try Guys Drunk Vs. High Pictionary"	15:43	March 2, 2022	TGGT	29	
545	433	"We Got Our Closets Professionally Organized"	17:41	March 5, 2022			
546	434	"Drunk Parents Explain Paw Patrol"	15:06	March 9, 2022			
547	435	"The Try Guys Dress Like Zach • Closet Swap Challenge"	16:47	March 12, 2022	Closet Swap	1	
548	436	"Eugene Gets Surprised By A Baby Deer 🦌"	10:27	March 16, 2022	Zoogene	2	
549	437	"The Try Guys Get Brazilian Waxes"	20:22	March 19, 2022			
550	438	"Try Guys Test Crazy 5 Min Fashion Crafts"	20:41	March 23, 2022			
551	439	"Keith Eats Everything At Red Lobster"	58:50	March 26, 2022	Eat The Menu	37	
552	440	"The Try Guys Dress Like Ned • Closet Swap Challenge"	16:31	March 30, 2022	Closet Swap	2	
553	441	"Try Moms Get Luxury Spa Treatments"	17:41	April 2, 2022			
554	442	"Try Guys Drunk Vs. High Operation"	15:54	April 6, 2022	TGGT	30	
555	443	"The Try Team Gets Celebrity Hair Makeovers"	19:50	April 9, 2022			
556	444	"Eugene Gets Surprised By An Owl 🦉"	11:01	April 13, 2022	Zoogene	3	
557	445	"Try Wives Test Viral TikTok Makeup"	13:27	April 16, 2022			
558	446	"Home-Cooked Vs. $200 Ice Cream Cake"	34:15	April 20, 2022	Date Night	6	
559	447	"Try Wives Try Horseback Riding"	18:04	April 23, 2022			
560	448	"Drunk Gays Explain RuPaul’s Drag Race To Straights"	31:42	April 27, 2022			
561	449	"Keith Eats Everything At Applebee's"	1:01:56	April 30, 2022	Eat The Menu	38	
562	450	"Try Guys Drunk Vs. High Charades"	25:09	May 4, 2022	TGGT	31	
563	451	"Moms Try Skydiving (13,000 FT)"	18:19	May 7, 2022			
564	452	"Keith & Eugene Rank The Taco Bell Menu"	34:08	May 11, 2022	Rank The Menu	2	
565	453	"Try Guys Try Prom Dresses"	19:21	May 14, 2022			
566	454	"The Try Guys Dress Like Keith • Closet Swap Challenge"	15:44	May 18, 2022	Closet Swap	3	
567	455	"Eugene Ranks The Most Popular Chips"	22:53	May 21, 2022	Rank King	13	
568	456	"Living In A $22 Million Mansion For A Day"	12:12	May 25, 2022			
569	457	"Keith Eats Everything At Baskin Robbins"	46:58	May 28, 2022	Eat The Menu	39	
570	458	"The Try Guys Dress Like Eugene • Closet Swap Challenge"	15:38	June 1, 2022	Closet Swap	4	
571	459	"Why Don't We Care About Disabled People?"	34:12	June 4, 2022			
572	460	"Eugene Gets Surprised By A Monkey 🐵"	10:15	June 8, 2022	Zoogene	4	
573	461	"Behind The Try: A Try Guys Documentary (FULL MOVIE)"	1:42:28	June 11, 2022			
574	462	"Keith Eats Everything At Domino’s"	55:05	June 15, 2022	Eat The Menu	40	
575	463	"Gay People Get Their Dream Fashion Makeovers"	29:42	June 18, 2022			
576	464	"Try Guys Mystery Wheel Blender Challenge"	23:59	June 22, 2022	Mystery Dish	6	
577	465	"Food Babies 60 oz Tomahawk Steak Challenge"	25:43	June 25, 2022	The Food Babies	9	
578	466	"Try Guys 3D-Print Cursed Facemasks"	18:05	June 29, 2022			
579	467	"Eugene Ranks the Most Popular Hard Seltzers"	29:17	July 2, 2022	Rank King	14	
580	468	"Try Guys Ultimate Indian Snack Taste Test"	22:18	July 6, 2022			
581	469	"Try Guys Make Wigs Without Instructions"	36:13	July 9, 2022	Without Instructions	8	
582	470	"Try Guys Try Celebrity Lingerie"	20:49	July 13, 2022			
583	471	"Try Guys Make Puppets Without Instructions"	33:49	July 16, 2022	Without Instructions	9	
584	472	"Keith Eats Everything at Panera"	1:01:33	July 20, 2022	Eat The Menu	41	
585	473	"Try Guys Design Nails Without Instructions"	33:12	July 23, 2022	Without Instructions	10	
586	474	"Women Get Mammograms For The First Time"	21:07	July 27, 2022			
587	475	"Try Guys Design Wedding Dresses Without Instructions"	35:59	July 30, 2022	Without Instructions	11	
588	476	"Ultimate Gay Trivia Game Challenge"	19:27	August 3, 2022			
589	477	"Keith Eats Every Pizza in NYC"	19:12	August 6, 2022	Eat The Menu	42	
590	478	"Trying Amazon 5-Star Beauty Products"	22:55	August 10, 2022			
591	479	"The Try Guys Get Hypnotized"	17:22	August 13, 2022			
592	480	"I Gained 20 Lbs of Muscle In a Year (for chronic pain)"	21:43	August 17, 2022			
593	481	"Keith Eats Everything At Yankee Stadium"	54:02	August 20, 2022	Eat The Menu	43	
594	482	"Try Guys Try Colonics"	13:31	August 24, 2022			
595	483	"Pro Chefs Control The Try Guys • Mystery Dish Challenge"	35:31	August 27, 2022	Phoning It In	1	
596	484	"Try Guys Make Hand Pulled Noodles with No Recipe"	43:11	August 31, 2022	Without A Recipe	20	
597	485	"Try Guys Try High Diving"	24:16	September 3, 2022			
598	486	"We Need To Talk About Texas featuring Beto O'Rourke"	1:22:22	September 7, 2022			
599	487	"Keith Eats Everything at Pizza Hut • Complete The Menu"	12:59	September 10, 2022	Eat The Menu	44	
600	488	"Try Guys Ruin Chocolate Eclairs w/ Pro Chefs • Phoning It In"	30:57	September 14, 2022	Phoning It In	2	
601	489	"Keith Eats Everything at a Vegas Buffet"	50:39	September 17, 2022	Eat The Menu	45	
602	490	"Try Guys Try Stand-Up Comedy"	23:23	September 24, 2022			
Keith, Zach & Eugene (2022–present)
603	491	"what happened."	5:31	October 4, 2022			
604	492	"the try guys audition for a broadway musical"	25:52	October 8, 2022			
605	493	"the try guys perform on broadway for the first time"	18:30	October 15, 2022			
606	494	"try guys 60-minute thanksgiving challenge"	26:45	October 22, 2022			
607	495	"Try Guys Mystery Wheel Clam & Cheese Challenge"	16:50	October 29, 2022	Mystery Dish	7	
608	496	"Try Guys Train Guide Dogs For A Day (feat. Molly Burke)"	13:00	November 2, 2022			
609	497	"Try Guys: Tokyo Drift"	13:30	November 5, 2022			
610	498	"Try Guys 30-Day Meditation Challenge"	14:50	November 10, 2022			
611	499	"Try Guys Hibachi Cook-Off"	11:11	November 13, 2022			
612	500	"Keith Eats Everything At Del Taco"	1:02:27	November 17, 2022	Eat The Menu	46	
613	501	"The Try Guys Make Pop-Tarts Without A Recipe"	39:57	November 20, 2022	Without A Recipe	21	
614	502	"Try Guys Giant Robot Spider (No really)"	8:23	November 24, 2022			
615	503	"The Try Guys Make Burgers Without A Recipe"	41:01	November 26, 2022	Without A Recipe	22	
616	504	"Keith Eats Everything At Katz's Deli"	42:28	November 30, 2022	Eat The Menu	47	
617	505	"The Try Guys Make Tacos Without A Recipe"	35:26	December 3, 2022	Without A Recipe	23	
618	506	"Try Guys Throw Zach's Dream Bachelor Party"	23:26	December 7, 2022			
619	507	"The Try Guys Make Boba Without A Recipe"	34:36	December 10, 2022	Without A Recipe	24	
620	508	"The Try Guys Make Illusion Cakes Without A Recipe"	47:17	December 14, 2022	Without A Recipe	25	
621	509	"what happens next!"	6:27	December 17, 2022			
622	510	"Try Guys Rank The Best Pets • Rank Court"	47:17	December 21, 2022	Rank Court	1	
623	511	"Try Guys Eat A Fine-Dining Cannabis Feast"	22:54	December 24, 2022			
624	512	"Keith Makes A Broadway Musical"	16:26	January 21, 2023			
625	513	"Keith Lets Fans Control His Day"	16:31	January 28, 2023			
626	514	"Try Guys Rank McDonald's Favorite • Rank Court"	21:38	February 4, 2023	Rank Court	2	
627	515	"I Survived 24 Hours in Times Square NYC"	15:01	February 11, 2023			
628	516	"Keith Eats Everything At Costco"	47:28	February 18, 2023	Eat The Menu	48	
629	517	"Try Guys Ruin Disney Cakes w/ Pro Chefs • Phoning It In"	35:34	February 25, 2023	Phoning It In	3	
630	518	"Try Guys Ruin French Macarons w/ Pro Chefs • Phoning It In"	33:04	March 4, 2023	Phoning It In	4	
631	519	"Try Guys Ruin Glazed Donuts w/ Pro Chefs • Phoning It In"	33:04	March 11, 2023	Phoning It In	5	
632	520	"Try Guys Rank Pizza Toppings • Rank Court"	19:23	March 15, 2023	Rank Court	3	
633	521	"Try Guys Ruin Fire Skull Cakes w/ Pro Chefs • Phoning It In"	40:57	March 18, 2023	Phoning It In	6	
634	522	"Mystery Opera Challenge • Surprise Talent Show"	26:30	March 22, 2023			
635	523	"Keith Eats Everything At IKEA"	54:07	March 25, 2023	Eat The Menu	49	
636	524	"Try Guys Find Every Japanese Snack in Little Tokyo"	54:07	March 29, 2023			
637	525	"3 Weeks Before My Wedding (the glass story)"	25:50	April 5, 2023	Zaggie Wedding	1	
638	526	"Try Guys Become Groomsmen for Zach’s Wedding"	15:18	April 8, 2023	Zaggie Wedding	2	

Notes

- ^Note 1: The ""Try Guys Ultimate Japanese Street Food Taste Test (ft. The Food Babies)", "Women Wear Wedding Dresses For The First Time", and "Food Babies 60 oz Tomahawk Steak Challenge" videos were marked as private videos as a result of Ned's removal from The Try Guys.
- ^Note 2: "The Try Team Gets Celebrity Hair Makeovers" was temporarily marked as private videos as a result of Ned's removal from The Try Guys but has been made public again

=== List of YouTube live videos ===
Overall				Spin-off shows		Source
No. in series	Title	Length	Air date	Series name	No. in series	Source
Keith, Zach & Eugene (2022–present)
1	"🔴Eat With Keith LIVE - A Taco Bell Dinner Experience"	1:32:26	November 29, 2022	Eat With Keith Live	1	
2	"🔴Eat With Keith LIVE - A McDonald's Dinner Experience"	1:36:46	December 6, 2022	Eat With Keith Live	2	
3	"🔴Eat With Keith LIVE - A KFC Dinner Experience"	1:50:00	December 13, 2022	Eat With Keith Live	3	
4	"🔴Eat With Keith LIVE - A Noodles & Company Dinner Experience"	1:45:37	February 2, 2023	Eat With Keith Live	4	
5	"🔴Eat With Keith LIVE - A 4/20 Frozen Pizza Experience"	1:57:30	April 20, 2023	Eat With Keith Live	5	
6	"🔴Eat With Keith LIVE - Keith's Big Taco Night Experience"	1:40:02	May 4, 2023	Eat With Keith Live	6	
7	"🔴Eat With Keith LIVE - Keith's Smashburger Dinner Experience"	1:50:17	June 1, 2023	Eat With Keith Live	7	
8	"🔴 Rank King LIVE - Eugene Ranks All of Your Names"	1:39:21	June 15, 2023			
9	"🔴 Try Guys Present Drag Queen Story Hour LIVE (FOR ALL AGES!)"	40:45	October 22, 2023			
10	"🔴 Try Guys Jackbox Game Night LIVE"	1:48:35	December 4, 2023	TGGT Live	1	
11	"Without A Recipe Live Pre-Show"	58:30	December 14, 2023			
12	"Keith Eats Every Ben & Jerry's Ice Cream • THE BELT"	1:48:35	January 10, 2024	The Belt	1	
13	"Mario Party Ruined Our Friendship • Try Guys Game Time LIVE"	1:28:14	January 17, 2024	TGGT Live	2	
14	"Try Guys Pokemon Trivia - Try Guys Game Time LIVE"	1:24:16	January 24, 2024	TGGT Live	3	
15	"Keith Eats Every Dorito Flavor In The World LIVE • The Belt"	1:18:27	January 31, 2024	The Belt	2	

=== List of YouTube shorts ===
No. in series	Title	Length	Release date	Original Video	Source
Keith, Zach & Eugene (2022–present)
1	"What we wanted to say last week."	0:31	October 4, 2022		
2	"Let’s talk about parasocial relationships"	0:40	October 7, 2022	"ok, let's talk about it. - The TryPod Ep. 181"	

== Series ==
Over the series of The Try Guys episodes, particular episodes have branched off as part of series of a specific topic or mini-series.

Series			Originally Aired		Status
Name	Starring	Episodes	Start Date	Latest Date	Status
Motherhood	All	6	May 6, 2015	May 10, 2015	Ended
Cosplay	All	4	August 1, 2015	August 4, 2015	Ended
K-Pop	All	4	September 23, 2015	September 26, 2015	Ended
Santa Spectacular	All	3	December 18, 2015	December 20, 2015	Ended
Ocean Survival	All	3	June 16, 2016	June 18, 2016	Ended
Fatherhood	All	5	June 13, 2017	June 17, 2017	Ended
Eat The Menu	Keith	58	September 23, 2017	present	Airing
Without A Recipe	All	29	November 11, 2017	present	Airing
Dirty Tour	All	3	January 27, 2018	February 10, 2018	Ended
Parenthood	All	16	June 17, 2018	March 16, 2019	Ended
The Barkchshler	Keith	5	July 11, 2018	December 24, 2018	Ended
Candid Competition	Zach	9	July 25, 2018	October 30, 2021	Ended
Ned & Ariel	Ned & Ariel	4	August 1, 2018	March 16, 2019	Ended
The Try Guys: Game Time	All	21	August 8, 2018	present	Airing
Rank King	Eugene	22	August 18, 2018	present	Airing
DUI	All	4	October 17, 2018	October 27, 2018	Ended
The Try Wives: Wine Time	Ariel, Becky & Maggie	6	December 19, 2018	present	Airing
Old Age	All	4	April 3, 2019	April 13, 2019	Ended
The TryPod	All, Miles & Rainie	343	May 4, 2019	December 18, 2025	Ended
The Food Babies	Alexandria & YB	8	July 3, 2019	July 3, 2021	Ended
Try DIY	Ned & Ariel	3	July 17, 2019	July 31, 2019	Ended
4 Vs. 1	All	10	October 28, 2019	October 6, 2021	Ended
Try Australia	All	6	November 2, 2019	November 20, 2019	Ended
Without Instructions	All	10	February 8, 2020	July 23, 2022	Ended
Beauty Month	All	4	March 7, 2020	March 28, 2020	Ended
#StayHome	All	27	March 16, 2020	July 29, 2020	Ended
Tea Time	Zach	6	May 13, 2020	August 24, 2020	Ended
Date Night	Ned & Ariel	4	May 16, 2020	Present	Ended
Retry	All	5	July 15, 2020	Present	Airing
Tailgate Debate	Keith	3	November 14, 2020	April 21, 2021	Ended
Try Wives	Ariel & Becky	8	December 19, 2018	July 18, 2020	Ended

Recurring shows

- Try Guys Game Time – All Try Guys

This segment includes the Try Guys sitting in a living room playing games and quizzes, such as 'who knows the other Try Guys best' and 'try not to laugh'. The feature has the Try Guys shouting "Try Guys Game Time!" throughout the video and each Try Guy wearing their signature onesie (Keith: giraffe, Zach: turtle, Eugene: tiger, Ned: rooster).

- The Barkchshler – Keith

This is a The Bachelor style segment which sees Keith judging dogs. Contestants compete by producing videos according to Keith's directions. Originally, it was just Keith dogsitting the Try Guys' pups for a whole day.

- The Rank King – Eugene

The segment features Eugene ranking things, such as fruit and cheap beer, from best to worst. The other Try Guys appear as guests to pick their favorites. It features Eugene's catchphrase: I'm right, you're wrong, shut up.

- Candid Competition – Zach

The segment sees Zach buying products, such as clothes or cakes, from several stores/manufacturers, without these companies knowing they are involved in a competition. Zach tests the products and picks a winner.

- Eat The Menu – Keith

This segment was born out of Keith's love for fast food, especially fried chicken. It involves him eating everything on the menu from popular restaurants like KFC, Taco Bell, Panda Express, McDonald's, Olive Garden and Burger King. Keith then decides which of the food items are best and the least best according to his standards.

- Ned & Ariel – Ned

This segment documents the life of Ned's family: his wife Ariel, his son Wes, and his dog Bean. This documented the struggles of becoming a new father during a newly bought house renovation.

- Try DIY – Ned

This segment is Ned & Ariel transforming their friend's forgotten spaces into beautiful interiors.

- Food Babies – Alexandria & YB

This segment is a spin-off of Keith's "Eat the Menu". What originally started as a Patreon series of Alexandria and YB trying to finish what remained of the "Eat the Menu" episodes, the women are challenged by the Try Guys to try to consume 400 chicken nuggets and 100 tacos. They also feature together in food-related episodes with the Try Guys.

=== "Without A Recipe" ===
The Try Guys compete against each other to try and create foods without a recipe.

Season	Episodes	Originally released	
Season	Episodes	First released	Last released
1	2	November 11, 2017	Dec 15, 2018
2	5	Dec 7, 2019	Jan 11, 2020
3	4	Dec 5, 2020	Dec 26, 2020
4	4	Jul 10, 2021	Jul 31, 2021
5	4	Nov 27, 2021	Dec 18, 2021

==== Season 1 ====
No. in series	No. in season	Title	Length	Release date	Source
102	1	"The Try Guys Bake Bread Without A Recipe"	18:32	November 11, 2017	
"It's The Great Try Guys Bake-Off!"
169	2	"The Try Guys Bake Pie Without A Recipe"	25:31	December 15, 2018	
"Four inexperienced bakers. No recipes. One goal: try to bake a perfect holiday pie #WithoutARecipe"

==== Season 2 ====
No. in series	No. in season	Title	Length	Release date	Source
281	1	"The Try Guys Bake Cookies Without A Recipe"	30:49	December 7, 2019	
"#WithoutARecipe is officially back! Which batch of #TryGuys cookies will bake it to the top?🍪🏆"
284	2	"The Try Guys Cook Bagels Without A Recipe"	33:04	December 14, 2019	
"#WithoutARecipe is all you knead! This week the guys are giving bagels a go, but which #TryGuy will dough it right?🥯🏆"
287	3	"The Try Guys Make Ice Cream Without A Recipe"	31:37	December 21, 2019	
"Which #TryGuy is gonna get served today? Keep watching because we’ve got the scoop on #WithoutARecipe!🍦"
290	4	"The Try Guys Bake Cakes Without A Recipe"	35:40	December 28, 2019	
"Batter up! Bakers, step up to the plate! This week on #WithoutARecipe #TheTryGuys are baking cakes, but who’s ready to whisk it all? Get a piece of this! 🍰"
295	5	"The Try Guys Make Waffle Cones Without A Recipe"	23:03	January 19, 2020	
"Who’s ready for some bonus baking? Which Try Guy’s Waffle Cone will stack up to the competition? 🧇👑"

==== Season 3 ====
No. in series	No. in season	Title	Length	Release date	Source
412	1	"The Try Guys Cook Dumplings Without A Recipe"	50:36	December 5, 2020	
"#WithoutARecipe is back! In today's episode watch us give dumplings a try and in a series first, we'll be challenged to cook IN FRONT of the judges! Ahhhh!"
415	2	"The Try Guys Bake Brownies Without A Recipe"	40:42	December 12, 2020	
"Let's bake! Enjoy another chaos and joy filled episode of Without A Recipe! Who's special brownies do you think will be the biggest hit with the judges?"
418	3	"The Try Guys Bake Pizza Without A Recipe"	39:39	December 19, 2020	
"... Slice, slice, babY! Who wants a pizza this?! This week we're bakin pizza's from scratch #WithoutARecipe"
421	4	"The Try Guys Bake Cheesecake Without A Recipe"	39:22	December 26, 2020	
"I'll take my cake with a bit of cheese please! It's the season finale of #WithoutARecipe! Watch The Try Guys battle it out in the final bake-off for the cooking crown!🧀🎂"

==== Season 4 ====
No. in series	No. in season	Title	Length	Release date	Source
474	1	"Try Guys Bake Muffins Without A Recipe"	36:15	July 10, 2021	
"Muffin’ compares to our love for #WithoutARecipe! Welcome to our special summer series featuring new guests, contestants, and judges! Who will bake their way to the top today?"
476	2	"The Try Guys Bake Macarons Without A Recipe"	51:36	July 17, 2021	
"We've got two new bakers in the Try Kitchen today and we're all eager to see who will bake the sweetest little thing! It's episode two of the #WithoutARecipe summer season and it's macarON baby!"
478	3	"The Try Guys Make Donuts Without A Recipe"	45:09	July 24, 2021	
"Donut stop believing in us just yet! Today we're getting as messy as we can get! Who's donuts do you think will pass the taste test? #WithoutARecipe"
480	4	"The Try Guys Make Ice Cream Cake Without A Recipe"	46:41	July 31, 2021	
"The moment you've all been waiting for! The finale of our summer season is here! But which baker's ice cream cake will be top tier?"

==== Season 5 ====
No. in series	No. in season	Title	Length	Release date	Source
TBA	1	"Try Guys Bake Cinnamon Rolls Without A Recipe"	47:56	November 27, 2021	
"Who's cinnamon rolls with swirl out on top on the very first episode of this year's #WithoutARecipe holiday season?! Watch us bake these rolls with no recipe... uh-ohhhh"
TBA	2	"Try Guys Bake Mac & Cheese Without A Recipe"	49:29	December 4, 2021	
"We hope this episode will Mac you smile :) Today we're trying to make baked mac & cheese FROM SCRATCH and #WithoutARecipe! Who's cheesy noods will take top dish?!"
TBA	3	"Try Guys Make Sausage Without A Recipe"	48:27	December 11, 2021	
"Get ready to get stuffed! Today we're trying to make our very own hot sausage links #WithoutARecipe! Who's brats will be the best and who's will be the wurst?"
TBA	4	"Try Guys Bake Gingerbread Houses Without A Recipe"	52:13	December 18, 2021	
"Oh snap! It's the final episode of our #WithoutARecipe holiday season! Who will bake the sweetest gingerbread house in all the land? Watch this most-anticipated season finale to find out!"

=== "Eat The Menu" ===
Keith eats everything on different fast-food menus.

Season	Episodes	Originally released	
Season	Episodes	First released	Last released
1	6	July 4, 2018	March 25, 2019
2	6	July 27, 2019	December 18, 2019
3	6	January 22, 2020	July 22, 2020
4	6	September 12, 2020	January 30, 2021
5	6	February 24, 2021	November 3, 2021
6	6	December 8, 2021	April 30, 2022
7	6	May 28, 2022	September 2, 2022
8	6	September 17, 2022	May 10, 2023
9	5	June 14, 2023	September 27, 2023
10	TBA	Oct 14, 2023	TBA

==== Season 1 ====
No. in series	No. in season	Title	Length	Release date	Source
1	1	"Keith Eats Everything At Taco Bell"	10:51	July 4, 2018	
"I hope I don't die, I hope I Live Mas." #EatTheMenu
2	2	"Keith Eats Everything At KFC"	18:26	September 26, 2018	
Keith tastes everything on the KFC menu. The Try Guys and one special guest join him this time! Dig in! #EatTheMenu
3	3	"Keith Eats Everything At Burger King"	19:35	March 4, 2019	
Keith tastes everything on the Burger King menu, making him the true Burger King of Kings.
4	4	"Keith Eats Everything At Panda Express"	18:59	March 11, 2019	
You know the drill: Keith tastes everything on the Panda Express menu. And don't worry, Keith made our employees, The Food Babies, eat the leftovers and filmed the entire thing for Patreon. Why aren't you a Patron yet?
5	5	"Keith Eats Everything At Olive Garden"	29:23	March 18, 2019	
In the wildest Eat The Menu yet, Keith tastes everything on the expansive Olive Garden menu from inside a Uhaul! It proves to be a star-studded episode full of special guests. What's your favorite item at Olive Garden? #eatthemenu
6	6	"Keith Eats $1200 Of Steak"	22:47	March 25, 2019	
In the season final of #EatTheMenu, our boy ups the cost and raises the stakes by trying every cut of beef at a steakhouse. What would you order?

==== Season 2 ====
No. in series	No. in season	Title	Length	Release date	Source
7	1	"Keith Eats Everything At Arby's"	26:49	July 27, 2019	
Giddy up cowboys! The flavor sheriff's comin' in HOT! Keith is going to attempt to eat EVERYTHING at Arby's! Did he bite off more than he can chew? You'll have to watch to find out! #YeeHaw
8	2	"Keith Eats Everything At Pizza Hut"	33:29	August 3, 2019	
Issa Pizza Party! Can Keith out Pizza the Hut?! You'll have to watch to find out!
9	3	"Keith Eats $500 Of Gourmet Cheese"	26:43	August 10, 2019	
There's no food quite as goud-as cheese! Watch Keith eat his way through $500 worth of gourmet cheese!
10	4	"Keith Eats Everything At Wendy's"	39:25	October 12, 2019	
The bitch is back! ♀ It's finally here! Watch Keith eat everything off the menu at Wendy's!
11	5	"Keith Eats Everything At McDonald's Australia"	29:20	November 16, 2019	
Keith ate everything at an Australian McDonald's and it was A LOT of bread! Aussie fans, what's your go to order from Macca's??
12	6	"Keith Eats Every Pie"	26:10	December 18, 2019	
Tis the season of pie-eating! Watch Keith eat ALL the pies while using #GoogleLens! How many of these pies do you think you could finish? Thanks to Google for sponsoring this video!

==== Season 3 ====
No. in series	No. in season	Title	Length	Release date	Source
13	1	"Keith Eats Everything At Shake Shack"	30:13	January 22, 2020	
Welcome to the first Eat The Menu on The Road where Keith tastes all your regional favs with the help of his Lewberger band! ENJOY!
14	2	"Keith Eats Everything At Whataburger"	29:21	February 19, 2020	
It's the latest episode of #EatTheMenu On The Road and Keith is chowin' down at a Texas favorite! Are y'all team Whataburger or team In-N-Out? Should we do a regional fast food showdown?
15	3	"Keith Eats Everything At Nando's PERi-PERi Chicken"	30:21	April 25, 2020	
Buckle up and get ready for a PERi-PERi pepper journey to chicken town! Keith's eating everything from Nando's!
16	4	"Keith Eats Everything At Popeye's & Raising Cane's"	31:25	May 18, 2020	
The episode you've all been waiting for! Keith is eating everything on the menu at Popeye's AND Raising Cane's! Don't forget to get yourself a bottle of Keith's chicken sauce!
17	5	"Keith Eats & Drinks Everything At Dunkin Donuts"	46:21	June 22, 2020	
A feast unlike any other! Keith is taking on the challenge of eating AND drinking everything on the menu at Dunkin Donuts!
18	6	"Keith Eats Everything At Gus’ Fried Chicken"	22:00	July 22, 2020	
Chicken Keith is back! And today he's eating everything on the menu at Gus’ WORLD FAMOUS Fried Chicken!

==== Season 4 ====
No. in series	No. in season	Title	Length	Release date	Source
19	1	"Keith Eats Every Kind Of BBQ!"	24:00	September 12, 2020	
Keith’s eating ALL the best BBQ in LA today and it looks TOO good!
20	2	"Keith Eats Everything At Sonic"	28:56	September 16, 2020	
Wow we could all use a Sonic shake rn... Watch Keith eat AND drink everything at Sonic! And get Keith’s brand spankin new burger sauce right now!
21	3	"Keith Eats Everything At Jack In The Box"	40:41	November 21, 2020	
Keith is back and so is Jack! Today he's eating everything on the menu from Jack in the box! featuring the rest of the guys!
22	4	"Keith Eats Every Kind Of Dumpling"	45:14	November 21, 2020	
Who doesn't love a Try Guys dumplin video?! Enjoy this amazing meal with Keith & Fam!
23	5	"Keith Eats & Drinks Everything At Starbucks"	22:25	December 23, 2020	
There's just something about those Starbucks holiday cups! Who's ready for a little holiday treat? Watch Keith eat & drink everything at Starbucks!
24	6	"Keith Eats Everything At Jollibee"	30:04	January 30, 2021	
It's the one you've all been waiting for! Keith finally ate the menu at Jollibee! What will Keith's most jolly and least jolly food items bee?

==== Season 5 ====
No. in series	No. in season	Title	Length	Release date	Source
25	1	"Keith Eats Everything At In-N-Out *SECRET MENU*"	33:20	February 24, 2021	
Get ready for 33 minutes of un-interrupted mouth-watering content! Keith is eating and drinking everything from In-N-Out (including the secret menu.)
26	2	"Keith Eats Everything At Subway"	38:52	March 27, 2021	
Who's ready to eat fresh?! Watch Keith eat everything at Subway in this episode of #EatTheMenu!
27	3	"Keith Eats Everything At Chipotle"	41:53	May 15, 2021	
The king of menus is back and he may or may not have a mega burrito melt down today! Watch Keith eat everything at Chipotle!
28	4	"Keith Eats Everything At A Theme Park"	37:18	June 12, 2021	
I know we always say this, but prepare for a WILD RIDE full of crazy eats! Keith's eating everything at Snoopy's favorite theme park, Knott's Berry Farm!
29	5	"Keith Eats Everything At Outback Steakhouse"	1:00:03	August 21, 2021	
Keith's going on a 6-hour long journey through the Outback with help from some special guests! Will he be able to eat everything from America's favorite 'Aussie' themed steakhouse?
30	6	"Keith Eats Every Wendy's Breakfast Item • Complete The Menu"	16:24	November 3, 2021	
Keith's comin in hot to complete the menu with his boys from @Lewberger! Will the Wendy's hot breakfast items pass their taste test?!

==== Season 6 ====
No. in series	No. in season	Title	Length	Release date	Source
31	1	"Keith Eats Everything At A Vegan Restaurant"	30:02	December 8, 2021	
This episode of Eat The Menu is a little slice of heaven! Watch Keith eat everything at a gourmet vegan restaurant!
32	2	"Keith Eats Everything At Chili's"	1:04:47	January 1, 2022	
We're ringing in the New Year with a fresh new episode of Eat The Menu! Today Keith's eating everything from southwest chicken egg rolls to a juicy Rib Eye at Chili's! Enjoy this action packed episode
33	3	"Keith Eats Everything At Carl's Jr."	46:59	February 26, 2022	
Howdy folks! The time has come for Keith to eat everything on the menu at Carl's Jr. or as some of you may know it, Hardee's!
35	5	"Keith Eats Everything At Red Lobster"	58:50	March 26, 2022	
Bring out the cheddar biscuits! Who’s ready for more #EatTheMenu? Watch Keith eat everything at Red Lobster!
36	6	"Keith Eats Everything At Applebee's"	1:01:57	April 30, 2022	
We’re “eatin’ good in the neighborhood!” Watch Keith eat everything from Applebees on this episode of #EatTheMenu!

==== Season 7 ====
No. in series	No. in season	Title	Length	Release date	Source
37	1	"Keith Eats Everything At Baskin Robbins"	46:59	May 28, 2022	
31 Flavors are no match for Keith! We’re getting through all of them and much more in this summer-ready episode of “EatTheMenu"
38	2	"Keith Eats Everything At Domino’s"	55:06	June 15, 2022	
Let me buy you pizza! Watch Keith eat everything from Domino’s on this episode of #EatTheMenu!
39	3	"Keith Eats Everything at Panera"	1:01:34	June 20, 2022	
To bread bowl or not to bread bowl? You tell us!! Watch Keith eat everything from Panera on this episode of #EatTheMenu!
40	4	"Keith Eats Every Pizza in NYC"	19:13	August 6, 2022	
TIf you walked from one end of New York City to the other, how many pizza restaurants would you find? Keith flew all the way to the big apple to find out!
41	5	"Keith Eats Everything At Yankee Stadium"	54:02	August 20, 2022	
I'm New Yawkin here! Keith and the gang review every food item at Yankee Stadium in a very special first edition of Eat The Venue.
42	6	"Keith Eats Everything at Pizza Hut • Complete The Menu"	13:02	September 2, 2022	
Keith and the @Lewberger boys are at it again, back at the Hut to find out what’s cookin’ as they eat their way to complete the menu!

==== Season 8 ====
No. in series	No. in season	Title	Length	Release date	Source
43	1	"Keith Eats Everything At A Vegan Restaurant"	30:02	September 17, 2022	
Eat The Menu is BACK! Keith is here to eat everything on the menu at Del Taco with some very special YouTube and TikTok guests along the way. Watch to see what items pass the taste test, and which ones are just a pass altogether.
44	2	"Keith Eats Everything At Del Taco"	1:02:28	November 16, 2022	
Eat The Menu is BACK! Keith is here to eat everything on the menu at Del Taco with some very special YouTube and TikTok guests along the way. Watch to see what items pass the taste test, and which ones are just a pass altogether.
45	3	"Keith Eats Everything At Katz’s Deli"	42:28	November 30, 2022	
Drumroll for… Keith Eats the Menu in NYC! This time, we went to Katz’s Deli to see if the pastrami on rye lives up to its reputation. Let’s eat the men
46	4	"Keith Eats Everything At Costco"	47:29	February 18, 2023	
Eat The Menu is back, and this time Keith indulges in your favorite supermart, Costco! What food items are Keith’s favorite, and which one’s aren’t worth the membership?
47	5	"Keith Eats Everything At IKEA"	54:08	March 25, 2023	
Furniture…and MEATBALLS? Get some fresh Swedish delicacies while testing out your next dining room table. Keith is here again to tell you what’s worth taking a shopping break, and what’s ok to leave in the courtyard. Let’s eat the menu!
48	6	"Keith Eats Everything At Cracker Barrel"	1:00:07	May 10, 2023	
Join Keith as he tries everything…well almost everything at Cracker Barrel! See what items got praise, and which ones didn’t make it beyond a smell test

==== Season 9 ====
No. in series	No. in season	Title	Length	Release date	Source
49	1	"Keith Eats Everything At Pike Place Market"	47:47	June 14, 2023	
Keith’s back to eat the menu, but this time, it’s at Pike Place Market in Seattle, Washington! What will rank as the best of the best and least best at this popular tourist destination?
50	2	"Keith Eats Everything At TGI Friday's"	1:03:44	June 28, 2023	
Keith’s back to eat the menu, but this time, it’s at Pike Place Market in Seattle, Washington! What will rank as the best of the best and least best at this popular tourist destination?
51	3	"Keith Eats Everything At Jersey Mike's"	45:06	August 2, 2023	
Keith’s eating the menu again, and this time it’s at Jersey Mike’s! Find out which items Keith and his special guests enjoy the most, and which ones just don’t make the cut.
52	4	"Keith Eats Everything At AMC Theatres"	53:50	August 26, 2023	
We come to this place…to watch Keith eat the entire menu because we need that, all of us. Somehow, food tastes better in a place like this...Today Keith eats the AMC menu!
53	5	"Keith Eats and Drinks Everything At Starbucks: The Summer Menu"	1:19:35	September 27, 2023	
Keith's back to eat the menu at Starbucks again, but this time, the summer menu!

==== Season 10 ====
No. in series	No. in season	Title	Length	Release date	Source
54	1	"Keith Eats Everything At Cheesecake Factory - Part 1"	1:05:08	October 14, 2023	
This is the Eat The Menu you’ve been asking for, waiting for, terrified for… it’s finally here! A menu SO GINORMOUS it’ll take three videos to cover it. Here’s part one, where all of our usual Eat The Menu friends stop by to eat with Keith… and wish him luck!
55	2	"Keith Eats Everything At Cheesecake Factory - Part 2"	59:01	October 21, 2023	
The Eat The Menu you’ve been asking for, waiting for, terrified for… is finally here! A menu SO GINORMOUS it’ll take three videos to cover it. Here’s part two, with lots of special guests you don’t usually see on Eat The Menu and that you definitely don’t want to miss!
56	3	"Keith Eats Everything At Cheesecake Factory - Part 3"	1:06:12	October 28, 2023	
The Eat The Menu you’ve been asking for, waiting for, terrified for… is finally here! A menu SO GINORMOUS it has taken three parts to finish. We have made it to the final boss and the cheesecakes are here, luckily, Keith has the help of some awesome special guests!
57	4	"Keith Eats Everything At Six Flags"	44:49	November 29, 2023	
Keith is back to eating everything with Eat The Venue: Six Flags Magic Mountain! This video is a literal rollercoaster of emotions and food choices so strap in and hold tight. Where should Keith eat everything next?

=== "The Barkchshler" ===
Keith makes his fans' dogs compete for his amusement

Season	Episodes	Originally released	
Season	Episodes	First released	Last released
1	1	July 11, 2018	
2	4	July 23, 2018	December 24, 2018

==== Season 1 ====
No. in series	No. in season	Title	Length	Winner	Release date	Source
1	1	"Keith Puppysits The Try Guys Dogs"	16:34	Bean	July 11, 2018	
Will Keith grow to love the Try Dogs, or will he have a ruff time? #TheBarkchshler

==== Season 2 ====
No. in series	No. in season	Title	Length	Winner	Release date	Source
2	1	"Keith Reviews 101 Puppies"	17:29	25 Finalists	July 23, 2018	
A lot of good boys and good girls enter, but only 25 will remain. #TheBarkchshler
3	2	"Keith Challenges 25 Dogs To Recreate The Bachelor"	12:24	11 Finalists	September 19, 2018	
25 dogs. One Keith. Can they get out of a car like in The Bachelor?
4	3	"Keith Judges 11 Dogs And Their Hometowns"	16:50	4 Finalists	December 10, 2018	
11 dogs compete for Keith's heart and show off where they're from. It's hometowns week on #TheBarkchshler
5	4	"Keith Crowns Instagram's Next Dog Superstar"	18:37	Charles Avacado Van Gogh	December 24, 2018	
In the thrilling season finale of #TheBarkchshler there are four deserving, adorable finalists. But only one arbitrarily viral dog can wear the crown...

=== "Candid Competition" ===
Zach makes big chains go head to head without their knowledge.

Season	Episodes	Originally released	
Season	Episodes	First released	Last released
1	9	July 25, 2018	October 30, 2021

No. in series	No. in season	Title	Length	Winner	Release date	Source
1	1	"Which Store Makes The Best Custom Cake?"	14:10	Ralphs	July 25, 2018	
Zach hunts down cakes across LA in a quest to answer which chain store makes the best custom birthday cakes. All in a new show we just made up called Candid Competition. #TryGuys #HappyBirthdayZach
2	2	"Which Store Has The Best Back To School Shopping?"	14:31	Target	August 25, 2018	
Candid Competition is back to shop at Target, Walmart, Gap, Kohl's and J.C. Penney to settle once and for which popular chain store has the *best* back to school shopping... as modeled by an adult man.
3	3	"Which Chain Makes The Best Custom Pizza?"	18:40	Little Caesars	February 20, 2019	
Candid Competition is back for all 5 of you who asked for it! This time, Zach and Keith pit Pizza Hut, Domino's, Papa John's, Little Caesars, and Walmart against each other in a battle of the 'za! Who will be able to create the most delicious and artful pie to win their hearts?
4	4	"Which Store Makes The Best Custom Sandwich?"	20:54	Jersey Mike's Subs	August 14, 2019	
Welcome back to Candid Competition! The network FINALLY gave us another episode! But now the question is: who will make the best custom sandwich with my face on it?!...and who tf keeps trying to cancel us?! ♂
5	5	"Which Makeup Counter Gives The Best Custom Makeover?"	20:23	Sephora	August 21, 2019	
Four different beauty counters with WILD instructions! Today Zach will settle the age old question: "Where's the best place to beat that face?!"
6	6	"Who Throws The Best Free Birthday Party?"	19:57	Walmart	August 28, 2019	
Where's the best place to blow those candles out?! Big boy Zach is determined to find out by seeing how much free birthday cake he can get from each restaurant chain in one day!
7	7	"What's The Best Place To Propose?"	34:00	P. F. Chang's	October 23, 2021	
We're back and we're getting hitched! Watch Zach and Miles go on a mission to find out which chain can pull off the best surprise proposal!
8	8	"Who Makes The Best Wedding Cake?"	20:09	Ralphs	October 27, 2021	
Time to cut the big cheese! Who will make the best tiered wedding cake grocery store chains have to offer?!
9	9	"Where's The Best Honeymoon Suite?"	27:44	Holiday Inn	October 30, 2021	
Hello lovers! The #CandidCompetition series climax you've all been waiting for is finally here! Which hotel chain do you think has the best honeymoon suites? Enjoy this sweet little treat!

=== "Ned & Ariel" ===
The adventures of the Fulmer family: Ned, Ariel, Wes, and Finn.

Season	Episodes	Originally released	
Season	Episodes	First released	Last released
1	4	August 1, 2018	March 16, 2019

No. in series	No. in season	Title	Length	Release date	Source
1	1	"My First Week As A Father *emotional*"	10:53	August 1, 2018	
Shortly after my baby Wes was born, he got sent to the Neonatal Intensive Care Unit (NICU). It completely tore me apart.
2	2	"Home-Cooked Vs. $1000 Gingerbread House"	13:13	November 28, 2018	
Ned & Ariel use their Google Home Hub to make a home-cooked gingerbread house then compare it to a $1000 gingerbread house at a fancy bakery. It's the Holiday Special of Night In / Night Out! #NightInNightOut
3	3	"Ned & Ariel's New House Tour"	21:38	December 8, 2018	
After a year of renovation and hard work, Ned & Ariel's house is finally finished! Watch their joys, their struggles, and their incredible house transformation from a falling down fixer-upper to a modern California dream house.
4	4	"Life Before Kids Vs. After Kids"	4:44	March 16, 2019	
The differences between life before a baby vs. life after. But Ned wouldn't change a thing.

=== "The Try Guys: Game Time" ===
It's Try Guys Game Time! A series of fun videos where you get to hang out with us, play games, and tell stories. #TGGT

Season	Episodes	Originally released	
Season	Episodes	First released	Last released
1	21	August 8, 2018	present

No. in series	No. in season	Title	Length	Winner	Release date	Source
1	1	"Which Try Guy Knows Keith The Best?"	10:25	Zach	August 8, 2018	
The #TryGuys test their knowledge of Keith trivia to find out who is actually his very best friend. Grab your onesies and head on over for the ultimate sleepover, because it's Try Guys Game Time: fun videos where you get to hang out with us, play games, and tell stories! #TGGT
2	2	"Which Try Guy Knows Ned The Best?"	11:25	Keith	August 15, 2018	
In this installment of Try Guys Game Time, the #TryGuys test their knowledge of Ned trivia to find out who is actually his very best friend! #TGGT
3	3	"Which Try Guy Knows Zach The Best?"	11:35	Eugene	August 22, 2018	
In this korny episode of Try Guys Game Time, the #TryGuys test how much they know about Zach "korndiddy" Kornfeld to find out who is actually his best kornbuddy! #TGGT
4	4	"Which Try Guy Knows Eugene The Best?"	12:56	Ned	August 29, 2018	
In this final friendship trivia edition of Try Guys Game Time, the #TryGuys are challenged with weird, scary, and surprising questions about Eugene to find out who is actually his best friend! #TGGT
5	5	"The Try Guys Roast Each Other's Instagrams"	11:39	Ned	September 5, 2018	
In this episode of #TryGuys Game Time, the guys host a social media roast where they skewer and joke about each other's worst Instagrams, tweets, and posts. #TGGT
6	6	"The Try Guys Reveal Their Favorite YouTubers"	10:16	N/A	September 29, 2018	
It's another edition of Try Guys Game Time! On this installment the guys share some of their favorite YouTubers and the many reasons they love them. #TGGT
7	7	"The Try Guys Try Not To Laugh Challenge"	13:43	Ned	November 21, 2018	
In this hilarious edition of Try Guys Game Time, the guys compete in three rounds of their own unique version of the Try Not To Laugh Challenge. #TGGT
8	8	"Who Were We Before The Try Guys?"	15:06	N/A	December 26, 2018	
In this revealing edition of Try Guys Game Time, the guys watch and react to videos they made before they knew each other, including a high school Spanish project, a violent K-Pop short film, and an ill-fated attempt to buy Tim Meadows pizza. #TGGT
9	9	"The Try Guys Play Boink, Marry, Kill"	19:08	N/A	March 27, 2019	
In this episode of Try Guys Game Time, the Try Guys play their own unique take on F*ck (Boink), Marry, Kill with some of the hardest, weirdest questions imaginable. Play along to see if you're a freak like them and write your answers in the comments!
10	10	"The Try Guys Play Beer Pong With Gross Drinks"	15:30	Ned & Eugene	May 1, 2019	
It's Try Guys Game Time, y'all! This time, the guys are playing beer pong with some gross mystery liquids. Who will throw up first?!
11	11	"The Try Guys Play Giant Jenga Truth Or Dare"	17:42	Ned, Eugene, & Zach	August 17, 2019	
Try Guys Game Time is back and so is Eugene!
12	12	"The Try Guys Try Debate Club"	20:26	N/A	February 5, 2020	
Is that a straw man argument I hear there? Choose your players!
13	13	"The Try Guys Find Out Their REAL Harry Potter Houses"	25:49	N/A	June 13, 2020	
We wanted to take this opportunity to denounce transphobia and to bring more awareness to organizations like The Trevor Project. Please give what you can through the DONATE button to help trans youth.
14	14	"The Try Guys Find Their Harry Potter Patronus"	15:55	N/A	June 29, 2020	
Please donate what you can to the Trevor Project using the donate button. Every dollar goes towards saving young LGBTQ lives by providing support through free and confidential suicide prevention.
15	15	"Try Guys Extreme Coffee Trivia Challenge"	28:28	Eugene	September 29, 2021	
Try Guys Game Time is back! Who do you think will win our crazy caffeinated coffee trivia challenge?!
16	16	"Try Guys Extreme Exercise Trivia"	20:02	Keith & Eugene	November 17, 2021	
Laughing gas just might be the steam we need to get through today’s challenge! Who will be crowned the official champion of EXTREME Exercise Trivia?
17	17	"Try Guys Strip Trivia (-130 degrees)"	24:44	Keith	December 27, 2021	
1. Ad Welcome to another round of extreme trivia! This time things are getting icy and one of these boys is stripping!
18	18	"Try Guys Extreme Puppy Trivia"	26:50	Keith	December 20, 2021	
The Try Holiday season isn't over yet! We're back with another bonus trivia video and to make your Monday brighter we brought tons of puppies! Does extreme trivia get any cuter than this?!
19	19	"Try Guys Extreme Sex Trivia"	22:37	Eugene	January 8, 2022	
Sooo who's going to be Mommy's favorite today? Find out on this episode of extreme trivia where we're learning about all things sex, and BDSM!
20	20	"Try Guys Drunk Vs. High Pictionary"	15:44	N/A	March 2, 2022	
The Try drunkies and stonies are back at it again with a Drunk Vs. High challenge! Who's picture will take the crown in this rousing game of inebriated Pictionary?!
21	21	"Try Guys Drunk Vs. High Operation"	15:55	Zach & Eugene	April 6, 2022	
Slow and steady everybody! The Try drunkies and stonies are back with another Drunk Vs. High challenge! Who do you think will be the best surgeon in this wacky game of Operation?

=== "Rank King" ===
Eugene is the rank king. He ranks things. He's right, you're wrong, shut up.

Season	Episodes	Originally released	
Season	Episodes	First released	Last released
1	12	August 18, 2018	present

No. in series	No. in season	Title	Length	Winner	Release date	Source
1	1	"Eugene Ranks Cheap American Beer"	14:43	Miller High Life	August 18, 2018	
Eugene drinks the 15 most popular cheap American beers and ranks them from best to worst.
2	2	"Eugene Ranks The World's Most Popular Fruit"	25:58	Strawberry	November 24, 2018	
In this berry special episode of #RankKing, Eugene and his mother rank the 21 most popular fruit in the world from best to worst.
3	3	"Eugene Ranks Every Girl Scout Cookie"	17:07	Samoas	March 9, 2019	
Eugene is surprised by some very special guests who help him rank your favorite seasonal cookies from best to worst. How would you rank them? #RankKing
4	4	"Eugene Ranks Every Astrological Sign From Best To Worst"	23:21	Virgo	March 23, 2019	
Eugene reads the stars to filth in the most brutally honest ranking of the twelve zodiac signs on the Internet. How would you rank the astrological signs?
5	5	"Eugene Ranks Every Disney Princess"	24:47	Mulan	October 2, 2019	
The king hath returned with his decree on the official Disney Princesses! Dost thou agree with his order? Drop your rankings below good people of Eugenia! #RankKing
6	6	"Eugene Ranks The Most Popular Cereals"	34:20	Cinnamon Toast Crunch	October 9, 2019	
Which breakfast of champions will be fit for our Rank King? Drop your cereal rankings below! #RankKing
7	7	"Who Is The Most Iconic Diva Of All Time?"	31:34	Whitney Houston	October 16, 2019	
The #RankKing and his Rank Mother are here to bring the music mayhem this week! Who will be crowned the most iconic diva of all time? May the best diva win!
8	8	"Eugene Ranks Popular Cocktails Around The World"	28:40	Manhattan	October 23, 2019	
It's the #RankKing season finale so it's time to celebrate! What better way then trying cocktails from around the world and RANK KING T-shirts!
9	9	"Eugene Ranks Every Popular Soda"	32:05	Coca-Cola	March 4, 2020	
The #RankKing is back and he's ready to do the dew just for you! Feel free to pop off about your fav soda pops in the comments!
10	10	"Eugene Ranks Every Spice In His Kitchen Cabinet"	32:21	Cumin	May 4, 2020	
As promised, here it is! Eugene is ranking EVERY spice in his kitchen cabinet and the Spice King has really out done himself with this one!
11	11	"Eugene Ranks The Cheapest Wines"	28:34	Underwood Pinot noir	January 16, 2021	
The King is back and he's got a new Queen at his side, the Regal Rank Wife, Becky! Today they're sipping only the cheapest of wines from their chalice! What will these lovers of wine decide?
12	12	"Eugene Ranks The Most Popular Reality TV Shows"	30:40	RuPaul's Drag Race	March 3, 2021	
You wanna be on top? Welcome back to #RankKing! Watch Eugene Rank the most popular reality shows that we love to hate and hate to love!

=== "The TryPod" ===
The TryPod
- Genre: Entertainment
- Language: English

Cast and voices
- Hosted by: Eugene Lee Yang; Ned Fulmer; Zach Kornfeld; Keith Habersberger; Miles Bonsignore; Rainie Toll

Production
- Production: Rainie Toll

Technical specifications
- Audio format: Podcast (via streaming or downloadable MP3)

Publication
- No. of seasons: 1 public (additional seasons on Patreon)
- No. of episodes: 343
- Original release: May 4, 2019 – December 18, 2025
- Provider: Ramble
- Updates: Weekly

Related
- Related shows: The Try Guys
- Website: https://tryguys.com/pages/podcast

The Try Guys have swum with sharks, survived in the wild, shocked themselves with birthing simulators, and risked their lives for their videos. In this weekly podcast they dissect their experiences as internet creators and best friends who have made a living failing upwards.

Season	Episodes	Originally released	
Season	Episodes	First released	Last released
1	343	May 4, 2019	December 18, 2025

No. in series	No. in season	Title	Changes to cast or format	Release date	Source(s)
1	1	"Sex Tapes and First Dates"	N/A	May 4, 2019	
In this pilot episode, The Try Guys discuss their insane tour this summer, Keith wants to make his own sex tape, and the guys answer some first date questions at a ridiculous restaurant.
2	2	"Crying On Airplanes"	N/A	May 9, 2019	
LIVE FROM NEW YORK – It's the TryPod! The guys are in New York this week for the YouTube Creators Summit. They dance, they rollerblade, and Eugene becomes the party shepherd for the YouTube community. Also, they read some of those salacious secrets people left in their review comments.
3	3	"First Class Hangovers"	Miles' debut	May 16, 2019	
Ned has four cups of coffee and is amped for the episode, and the guys recount their exciting first, First class experiences. We round it out with Eugenes unpopular opinion on babies, and Miles gives advice, that will go... for miles.
4	4	"Arrested At A Wedding"	N/A	May 23, 2019	
The guys get into the hot deets of Zach's dream wedding, Ned and Eugene debate band over DJ, and Keith would very much like to be hiding inside the cake with a thousand doves.
5	5	"Keith's Internet Beef"	N/A	May 30, 2019	
Keith dishes about his big internet BEEF, the guys answer pressing questions sent to "advicethatwillgoformiles" email ID, and Ned tells the audience... to wear fedoras.
6	6	"Secret Naked Party"	No Eugene	June 6, 2019	
Ned discusses the secret naked party he attended at Yale, and Keith recounts the story of how he came to own over 50 Snuggies.
7	7	"Answering Steamy Questions"	N/A	June 13, 2019	
The guys go deep into the depths of Yahoo Answers and answer burning, strange questions. They debate whether sweat is sexy, and ponder what it would be like to have a web hole like a spider.
8	8	"Try Guys Make A $100 Million Movie"	N/A	June 20, 2019	
The Try Guys write, and cast a movie that will never be made, starring Reese Witherspoon, Lin Manuel-Miranda, and Meryl Streep. They also read some iTunes review secrets, and get some advice about bidets, that will go for Miles.
9	9	"Drunk at Disney World"	N/A	June 27, 2019	
Eugene yells at Mulan in Disney World, and the boys discuss their love and infatuation of Disney parks. Also Keith goes in hard on the movie Brave... spoiler: he doesn't like it.
10	10	"The Try Guys Live In A Bus For 10 Days"	No Eugene	July 4, 2019	
The guys are back from tour (except Eugene) and they have tales from the road. Keith talks about how he is a Grammy Award winner, and all the wild mistakes that happened on their tour.
11	11	"Ned's Firework Accident"	No Eugene	July 11, 2019	
This week we read juicy fan secrets, face a terrifying monster, and contemplate selling our bathwater. Also Ned shares his earthquake fears, and Zach contemplates selling his own bathwater.
12	12	"The Try Guys Battle Drag Queens"	N/A	July 18, 2019	
The boys are back to discuss their wild vidcon experiences, their performance with the drag queens from RuPauls Drag Race, and Zach's food poisoning.
13	13	"Keith's Deadly Bee Attack"	No Ned	July 25, 2019	
The guys answer fan questions that have been stacking up on "advicethatwillgoformiles" email ID, and Keith has HOT TIPS about flossing.
14	14	"Tana Mongeau Tried To Date Keith Before Jake Paul"	No Eugene	August 1, 2019	
Keith tells the story about Tana trying to date him at the streamy's, the guys react to the Cats Trailer, and Ned discusses his favorite types of movies: AWESOME MOVIES.
15	15	"Keith's $2,000 Chicken Mistake"	No Eugene	August 8, 2019	
Keith makes a very expensive mistake on tour, the guys sneeze to satisfy a fan request, and Zach is amped for Hobbs and Shaw.
16	16	"Eugene's Childhood Sewer Secret"	No Keith	August 15, 2019	
Eugene is back from his vacation, and we ask him revealing questions about his past, Zach gives his abbreviated review of Hobbs and Shaw, and Miles gives advice, about Netti Pots.
17	17	"Zach's Taylor Swift Twitter Feud"	N/A	August 22, 2019	
Zach gets into twitter drama and almost gets canceled, ned goes OFF about the moon landing, and the Keith tries to find conspiracy video on the internet.
18	18	"Ned Tries Car Jousting (DISASTER)"	No Eugene	August 29, 2019	
The guys answer a wild fan question that prompts Ned to talk about his Car Jousting experience, Zach goes on a tirade against the postal service, and the guys react live to the new star wars trailer. They. Are. Amped.
19	19	"Keith's $1,000,000 Business Idea"	Ft. Lewberger	September 5, 2019	
Keith's comedy music band Lewberger is in the studio for a quick mini podcast before the episode. Be sure to tune in to NBC's Bring the Funny to watch them compete Tuesday, September 10th, and don't forget to vote. Then, the guys go head to head in a Shark Tank style battle of business ideas. Keith's involves giant bugs.
20	20	"My Family Was In The Jewish Mafia"	No Keith	September 12, 2019	
Eugene reads a saucy secret, Ned gives sexy financial advice, and Zach shares some details about his families dark past.
21	21	"Keith Eats Every Flavor Of Chips"	N/A	September 19, 2019	
Keith holds his long-awaited review of every chip flavor. Also, he discusses the finale of Bring The Funny, and the guys get into some Reddit Rumors about themselves.
22	22	"Ned's Insane Mansion Party"	No Ned or Zach	September 26, 2019	
Ned went to a mansion party and didn't tell the guys, Eugene talks about how to win halloween, and the guys each discuss the classic, or not classic, movies they would remake for the modern day. THIS. IS. The TryPod.
23	23	"Eugene Ranks Harry Potter Films"	N/A	October 3, 2019	
It's just Keith, Eugene, and the gremlin in the studio today and YOU KNOW WHAT THAT MEANS: the boys talk about harry potter characters, Cho Chang snogging in the room of requirement, Ash Ketchum's problems, and the world of cartoons.
24	24	"Try Guys Try Planning A Wedding"	N/A	October 10, 2019	
In this week's episode, the guys get an amazing drunk email, and start a new email ID alias "ImDrunkTryGuys". Also, Eugene is officiating a wedding, and the guys are... planning it??
25	25	"Ned Was Attacked By Wild Birds"	N/A	October 17, 2019	
This week the guys return from their World Tour, and get into their adventures. Ned got attacked by a Magpie and Keith befriended and alpha Kangaroo. The guys determine which spooky urban legends are true, and... NOT true.
26	26	"The Try Guys Rank The Jonas Brothers"	N/A	October 24, 2019	
This week the boys debate the hottes JoBro, and read some of your drunken emails. Miles gets an award from Eugene, and they plan a video with llamas.
27	27	"The Haunting Of Eugene Lee Yang"	Ft. Alexandria Herring	October 31, 2019	
The guys read some listener ghost stories, Alex Herring shares her ghost experience in her apartment, and Eugene opens up about some of his... paranormal experiences. Happy Halloween!
28	28	"Zach Meets The Pornstar Next Door"	N/A	November 7, 2019	
Its all Zach and Keith this week baby. Zach meets an interesting neighbor, Keith picks a bone with an airbnb owner, and producer Rachel stops by to discuss their upcoming Without A Recipe series.
29	29	"Sexy Drama Teen High School"	No Eugene or Ned	November 14, 2019	
Keith and Eugene are back for another duet. They dive into the ridiculous lore of the super Mario universe, Streaming wars, Disney plus, and all the different sexy teen murder high school shows throughout the ages. Also Sam the production assistant drops in to share some pop culture opinions
30	30	"The Cats Movie Is Too Sexy"	No Ned or Zach; ft. Sam Johnson	November 21, 2019	
The Boys are back in the studio to react to the new Cats trailer, and Zach has some important questions for Miles from last weeks podcast.
31	31	"Keith's BEEF with Taco Bell"	N/A	November 28, 2019	
Happy thanksgiving! The boys chat about being thankful, dinosaurs, play Trending Page or Trending RAGE and Keith dishes about his big taco bell BEEF.
32	32	"Zach's TikTok Adventure"	N/A	December 5, 2019	
The boys are back from Thanksgiving to talk about their beefs, Zach getting into TikTok, Baby Yoda, and drunk emails from listeners. Listen to it BABY.
33	33	"INSANE Try Guys Holiday Party"	N/A	December 12, 2019	
The boys got wild at their holiday party, Zach got snubbed by Forbes, and Miles has some very special advice... that will go... for miles.
34	34	"The Try Guys Are Losers..."	No Keith	December 19, 2019	
We lost the Streamy's but were here to rock out with the podcast! The boys share their Try Of The Week, Eugene visits a fancy Hollywood party to face is fears, and Zach visits a party, that will go for Miles.
35	35	"The Try Guys Made A Christmas Movie"	N/A	December 26, 2019	
Merry Christmas and Happy Hanukkah!!! Today on a very special episode of the TryPod, the guys make their very own Christmas movie, and share their favorite holiday traditions.
36	36	"TryPod Rewind 2019 (Best Of The Try Guys Podcast)"	N/A	January 2, 2020	
Happy New Year!! The Try Guys look forward to their year ahead, before revisiting some of your favorite podcast moments of the year. Thank you to everyone who voted, and everyone who listened in 2019!
37	37	"Keith Has A Crush On Shawn Mendes"	N/A	January 9, 2020	
Keith shares a secret about Shawn Mendes, Ned tells a terrifying story, and the guys have a thoughtful conversation about the current state of things.
38	38	"we apologize to justin bieber..."	N/A	January 16, 2020	
Eugene comes to the podcast very sick, and Keith has to issue an apology.
39	39	"Eugene Recreates High School Musical"	N/A	January 23, 2020	
Eugene throws a wild party and the guys make a big Super Bowl bet.
40	40	"Ned's Stolen Identity"	N/A	January 30, 2020	
The boys deal with some stolen identity, and Zach has a new celebrity BFF.
41	41	"The Try Guys Rank The Hottest Pokemon"	N/A	February 6, 2020	
This week is a big one. The guys rank the hottest starter Pokémon evolutions, Ned shares a thrilling true crime story from his jury duty sessions, and Eugene was caught wearing a samurai helmet during a car crash.
42	42	"Try Guys Try Foot Modeling"	No Ned	February 13, 2020	
The Try Guys and Miles talk about their experiences with foot modeling in their upcoming Try Guys video.
43	43	"we've been lying to you..."	N/A	February 20, 2020	
Zach has a big secret, and its time to reveal it. It's Bujo. Also the guys went to a wild party that will go for Miles.
44	44	"Zach Exposes His Coworkers"	No Eugene, Keith, or Ned; ft. Jonathan Kirk, Sam Johnson, & Will Witwer	February 27, 2020	
Welcome to a very special episode of The TryPod. Zach is ALONE in the studio (With Miles), and they dive deep on first kisses, hickies, Pokémon, and more. Also Zach uses this time to give performance reviews to his staff.
45	45	"Betrayed By My Best Friend"	No Keith	March 5, 2020	
This week the guys examine how just how small Zach is, and whether or not he is a true "short king". They also get into Coronavirus, and talk about a trend that is sweeping the nation... Yoga.
46	46	"CANCEL THE TRY GUYS"	N/A	March 12, 2020	
The guys attempt to get cancelled because of Keith's beef with... beef. Ned discusses a street brawl that he was a part of, and Keith reveals his love of Lizards.
47	47	"Try Guys Try Working From Home"	Via Zoom	March 19, 2020	
The guys have been working from home, and boy are they glad to see each other. They also talk about Powerpuff Girls, Video Games, and how they are all dealing with the boredom from social distancing.
48	48	"Try Guys Try Taking Sexy Selfies"	Via Zoom	March 26, 2020	
The guys have continued to stay at home working on their laptops and desktops! They start talking about what they have been doing over the past couple of days and their new or renewed hobbies. The guys also take off their shirts in response to Eugene starting shirtless.
49	49	"Keith Gets Club Drunk (At Home)"	Via Zoom; bonus Tuesday podcast	March 31, 2020	
That's right people! A TryPod on a Tuesday?? YEAH. We're doing episodes Tuesdays AND Thursdays! This week Keith got super lit in his house, and shares pro tips for quarantine forts. Also, Eugene tells some truly horrifying childhood stories... yikes.
50	50	"The Try Guys Get Bangs"	Via Zoom	April 2, 2020	
The guys answer a very important question from a listener, and Eugene shares another shocking story from his past.
51	51	"Zach Tries Animal Crossing"	No Eugene; via Zoom; bonus Tuesday podcast	April 7, 2020	
We're back for another Tuesday episode! Zach plays the game sweeping the nation, and Keith has another very important update. An EGG update.
52	52	"The Try Guys Steal Ideas From Smosh???"	No Keith (except intro); recorded pre-pandemic (except intro via Zoom)	April 9, 2020	
The guys visit from the past in a gameshow episode! We steal mercilessly from Smosh, The Voice, and The Price Is Right. One will be crowned the winner, and receive a BIG special prize.
53	53	"Justin Bieber Hates Us (Confirmed)"	Via Zoom; bonus Tuesday podcast	April 14, 2020	
Zach tells his Justin Bieber related red carpet run-in, and the guys talk about bugs for a LONG while. Seriously most of this episode is about bugs. It's fantastic.
54	54	"Drag Queens Vs. Zombies"	Recorded pre-pandemic (except intro via Zoom)	April 16, 2020	
The guys plan out their zombie apocalypse teams, come up with an incredible movie idea, and cast themselves in their very own space themed teleplay.
55	55	"Eugene Tries College Acapella"	No Zach; via Zoom; bonus Tuesday podcast	April 21, 2020	
Eugene was in a college a cappella group, and the boys talk about their alternate dimension careers.
56	56	"The Try Guys Rank The Avengers"	Via Zoom	April 23, 2020	
The guys rank the Avengers, and decide who is best to party with.
57	57	"Eugene Tries UFO Hunting"	Via Zoom	April 30, 2020	
The guys talk about Alien sightings, their conspiracy theory dreams, and Zach shares a personal story.
58	58	"Try Guys Try Sexy Graduation Costumes"	Via Zoom	May 7, 2020	
This week the boys have some very fun news. Blake Lively becomes a Try Guy, and Elon Musk becomes a nightmare.
59	59	"Eugene's Naughty New Business"	Via Zoom	May 14, 2020	
Zach's got a new tea, and Eugene has a new... business idea as well. This episode is a wild one, so don't say we didn't warn you.

=== "Food Babies" ===
Season	Episodes	Originally released	
Season	Episodes	First released	Last released
1	2	July 3, 2019	present

No. in series	No. in season	Title	Length	Release date	Source
1	1	"Keith's 400 Chicken McNugget Challenge ft. The Food Babies"	16:02	July 3, 2019	
Welcome to the first official episode of Food Babies! The Try Guys challenged us 400 chicken nuggets from McDonald's and WELP, watch to see how it went.
2	2	"We Ate 20,000 Calories At Taco Bell"	20:59	September 11, 2019	
The Food Babies are back and they're living más! Can they complete the 100 Taco Bell taco challenge?! Watch to find out!

=== "Try DIY" ===
Ned & Ariel transform their friend's forgotten spaces into beautiful interiors!

Season	Episodes	Originally released	
Season	Episodes	First released	Last released
1	3	July 17, 2019	July 31, 2019

No. in series	No. in season	Title	Length	Release date	Source
1	1	"Keith & Becky's $3,000 Junk Room Makeover * Try DIY"	16:34	July 17, 2019	
Welcome to Try DIY! The show where Ned and Ariel try to transform their friend's forgotten spaces and places into beautiful interiors! In this episode Ned & Ariel will help Keith & Becky tackle their "shame" room! Can they fix it?! ♀
2	2	"Zach's Surprise $2,500 Home Office Makeover * Try DIY"	16:07	July 24, 2019	
Watch Ned & Ariel work their magic again! This time, the Try DIY fairy godparents are here to make Zach and Maggie's wish for a stunning home office come true! Bippity boppity BOOPS!
3	3	"Surprise $2,800 Studio Apartment Makeover * Try DIY"	15:15	July 31, 2019	
It's the Try DIY season finale! Ariel and Ned's final DIY mission is to help Ariel's sister, Danielle, completely re-vamp her studio apartment!

=== "You Can Sit With Us" ===
The Try Guys launched a second podcast called You Can Sit With Us. It features Becky, Keith's wife; Maggie, Zach's wife, Rachel, the Try Guy's producer, and previously Ariel, Ned's Wife. Occasionally the show features Matt, Eugene's boyfriend. The show is also produced by Miles Bonsignore, however while he speaks in the TryPod, Miles rarely speaks on You Can Sit With Us.
