= Eugene Lee Yang =

American filmmaker and internet personality (born 1986)

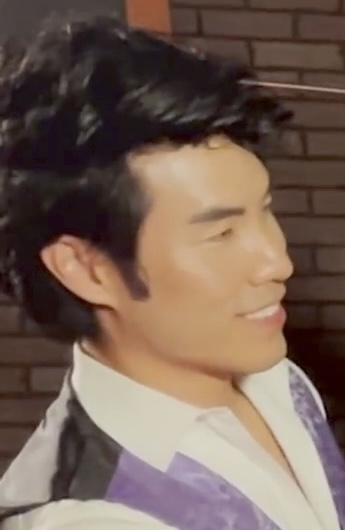
- Yang in 2021
- Born: January 18, 1986 (age 40); Waco, Texas, U.S.
- Education: University of Southern California
- Occupations: Filmmaker; actor; author; activist; internet personality
- Organization(s): 2nd Try, LLC
- Partner: Matthew McLean (2012–present)

Korean name
- Hangul: 양유진
- RR: Yang Yujin
- MR: Yang Yujin

Eugene Lee Yang (born January 18, 1986) is an American filmmaker, actor, author, activist, and internet personality. He is known for his work with BuzzFeed (2013–2018) and for being the co-founder of the comedy group The Try Guys (2014–2024) and its company 2nd Try LLC.

Yang is also known for his work with various human rights and LGBTQ+ advocacy charities such as The Trevor Project.

== Early life and education ==
Yang, the only son of South Korean immigrants Min-yeong Lee (Korean: 이민영) and Jae-hong Yang (Korean: 양재홍), was born in Waco, Texas, and raised in Pflugerville, Texas. He discovered he had some Chinese and Japanese ancestry in addition to his mostly Korean roots after taking a 23andMe DNA test. He has two sisters. Growing up in Pflugerville, Yang's family was one of the few Asian American families in their community. He struggled with body image issues and low self-esteem as, in his own words, no one looked like him and suffered bullying due to his appearance.

Early on, he lost his Texan accent by the prodding of his sister, who told him he might face difficulties getting into Ivy League schools. Initially, he was skeptical about pursuing a career in film, explaining that his doubts regarding gaining acceptance in mainstream media stemmed from the lack of queer and Asian American representation in films:

I was a very insecure, self-conscious kid, and as an artist even more so. I always assumed that my otherness was a curse – that I would be held back by my Asian and queer identities. My time online has shown me that the viewers will respond most to authentic storytelling.

At school, he engaged in artistic activities including visual arts, illustration, theater, choir, and dance. However, a seventh-grade teacher recommended that he should consider studying filmmaking. He attended the University of Southern California and, during his studies, wrote and directed six short films discussing social and political topics, including mental health care, gay marriage, and school shootings. He graduated with a B.A. in cinema production in 2008.

== Career ==
=== Early career ===
After college, Yang did freelance work producing music videos and writing and filming commercials for five years.

=== BuzzFeed ===
In 2013, he started working for the video branch of the internet media company BuzzFeed, at the recommendation of a colleague who saw his potential in creating short-format videos. He was given free control on experimental video productions and explored new modes of storytelling.

A few of his works were centered on stereotypes, body issues, and Asian American identity, producing If Disney Princes Were Real, which had earned over 70 million views, and Women's Ideal Body Types Throughout History, which was viewed over 40 million times and remained one of Buzzfeed's most watched on YouTube. According to Glamour, "Yang's videos work because they're funny-with-a-message riffs on all-American cultural touchstones—like high school vs. college, awkward private moments, and pet ownership. But he's also not afraid to tackle issues surrounding race—especially when it comes to the Asian American community."

=== The Try Guys ===
Reaction to some of his early works was positive, particularly on their distinct candor and reliability, which led to more provocative sketches such as The Try Guys, which was established at Buzzfeed in 2014 with co-stars Ned Fulmer, Keith Habersberger, and Zach Kornfeld. The show is a mix of social commentary and humor depicting scenarios such as men going through labor pains and prostate cancer checkups at a doctor's office. The cast initially was hesitant about stepping out from behind the camera as they had limited experience being talents, but they continued producing videos for the show after receiving positive feedback.

Yang became a recognized name on social media, taking on challenges, such as the first season's first episode, "Guys Try Ladies' Underwear For the First Time." The New York Times considered him the breakout star of The Try Guys.

On June 16, 2018, he and the rest of the cast of The Try Guys announced that they had left BuzzFeed and established 2nd Try LLC, a company that they own and manage. The 2nd Try LLC gained all rights to The Try Guys brand. Yang was the first Try Guy to leave Buzzfeed, as his contract ended first.

On May 4, 2019, The Try Guys announced that they were publishing a book called The Hidden Power of F*cking Up, which was published June 18, 2019, and became a New York Times Best Seller. In the same video, The Try Guys also announced their tour, which took on an "'80s rock-band theme," and their podcast, which is called the "Try-Pod."

In October 2020, the Try Guys endorsed Joe Biden's 2020 presidential campaign.

In May 2024, Habersberger and Kornfeld revealed that Yang would be concluding his activities with the Try Guys following their upcoming season of content. Yang formally announced his departure in a video released on May 23. He went on to explain that he was pursuing other artistic ventures and his general discomfort with the publicity that came with being a social media influencer. Yang stated that he still planned to continue making guest appearances in the future.

=== Television and film ===
In 2019, Yang made a guest appearance on NBC sitcom Brooklyn Nine-Nine, portraying Theo Lorql.

In 2023, he starred in the animated Netflix film Nimona as Ambrosius Goldenloin.

=== Novels ===
Yang has announced that his YA fiction writing debut will be a two-part queer fantasy epic called The Unders, with the first book scheduled to release in spring 2025.

== Activism ==
In July 2022, Yang hosted a fundraiser with Beto O'Rourke, a gubernatorial candidate in Texas.

=== Asian American representation ===
Yang advocates for equality, representation and diversity in his projects, tackling racial issues surrounding Asian American identity and the lack of interest in casting Asian American men as audiences are exposed to desexualized secondary roles or comedic sidekicks.

The Buzzfeed video parody, Awkward Moments Only Asians Understand, in which he starred, listed a slew of racial stereotypes and daily microaggressions. Marcie Bianco wrote in her critique, "The microaggressions detailed in this BuzzFeed video don't have to do with the size of the Asian population, but rather highlight how stereotypes are perpetuated by generalizations. Perhaps sometimes useful shorthand, these generalizations turn into ugly and limiting stereotypes that foreclose the possibility of people knowing each other as individuals."

In another related video, If Asians Said the Stuff White People Say, in which he starred together with Los Angeles-based writer and comedian Jenny Yang, featured Asian Americans asking questions and making comments to white characters that were considered uncomfortable for Asian Americans. In her review, Lauren Davidson wrote, "That's the first racist stereotype turned on its head in BuzzFeed Yellow's latest video, which shows, with that classic trick of role reversal, how ridiculous Asian typecasting has become."

On March 17, 2017, he produced Asian Men Re-Create Iconic Underwear Ads, which explored the theme of Asian men as sexually inferior. The video recreated iconic ads of underwear using average Asian male models.

In 2021, The Try Guys posted a fundraising documentary, We Need To Talk About Anti-Asian Hate, which Yang discusses the history of hate crimes against Asian Americans in response the rise in attacks during the COVID-19 pandemic. Many prominent Asian Americans are featured in the video, such as Andy Kim and Lisa Ling. As of December 2023, they raised over $140,000 for the Asian American and Pacific Islanders (AAPI) Community Fund.

=== LGBTQ ===
Yang was the only openly gay member among the cast of The Try Guys during his time with the group, which also produced LGBTQ-themed videos such as season 1 episode 3, The Try Guys Try Drag for the First Time. On October 31, 2018, he published the video My Dad's First Drag Show (Featuring Kim Chi), where he adopted a similar approach to exploring drag culture by inviting his father and stepmother to a drag show. Yang has adopted the drag queen persona named Cheyenne Pepper, and Mayhem Miller from season 10 of RuPaul's Drag Race is Pepper's drag mother.

He also executive produced and hosted Buzzfeed's Queer Prom five-part video series that documented the journey of eight high school seniors who attended the company's first LGBTQ-themed prom together with other students.

On October 11, 2018, commemorated as the 30th year of National Coming Out Day, he took over the website of the advocacy group Human Rights Campaign, publicly sharing his experience growing up as a young queer man and advocating for LGBTQ representation in the media. Furthermore, he collaborated with The Trevor Project, a non-profit LGBTQ suicide prevention organization, to raise awareness on the incidence of suicide among LGBTQ youth and in inviting volunteers in the video Eugene Volunteers at the Trevor Project, which was posted on December 3, 2018.

He previously referred to himself as "queer" and "LGBT." However, on June 15, 2019, Yang explicitly came out as gay in a music video. Two days later, Yang released an accompanying video documenting the video's creation, his feelings, and his thoughts surrounding his coming-out process.

== Personal life ==
On June 15, 2019, Yang came out as gay in a YouTube video that has donated over $150,000 to The Trevor Project. Since 2012, he has been in a relationship with Matthew McLean.

== Filmography ==
=== Film ===
Year	Title	Role	Notes	Ref.
2014	Comfort Girls	N/A	Director; writer	
2020	Behind the Try	Himself		
2023	Nimona	Ambrosius Goldenloin (voice)		
TBD	Spring Bloom †		Post-production	

Key
†	Denotes works that have not yet been released

=== Television ===
Year	Title	Role	Notes	Ref.
2019	Brooklyn Nine-Nine	Theo Lorql	1 episode; "Four Movements"	
2022	No Recipe Roadtrip with The Try Guys	Himself	Writer	
2023	Star Wars: Visions	Toul (voice)	1 episode; "Journey to the Dark Head"	

== Awards ==
Yang won several awards for his work with The Try Guys. Additionally, on June 20, 2016, he was awarded Unforgettable 2015 Male Breakout Star of the Year. In October 2019, he was awarded the Human Rights Campaign's Visibility Award. In May 2020, he was given the Phenom Award for LGBTQ+ Activism from the Shorty Awards for his work with The Trevor Project, for whom he has hosted multiple fundraising events and raised over $150,000 through his coming-out video. Yang was one of the first honorees given the 2021 YouTube Channel Changer Award for his work for racial justice through his documentary and fundraiser, We Need To Talk About Anti-Asian Hate.

== See also ==
- List of The Try Guys episodes
